= Second Boer War =

1899–1902 war in South Africa

- Part of the Boer Wars during the Scramble for Africa
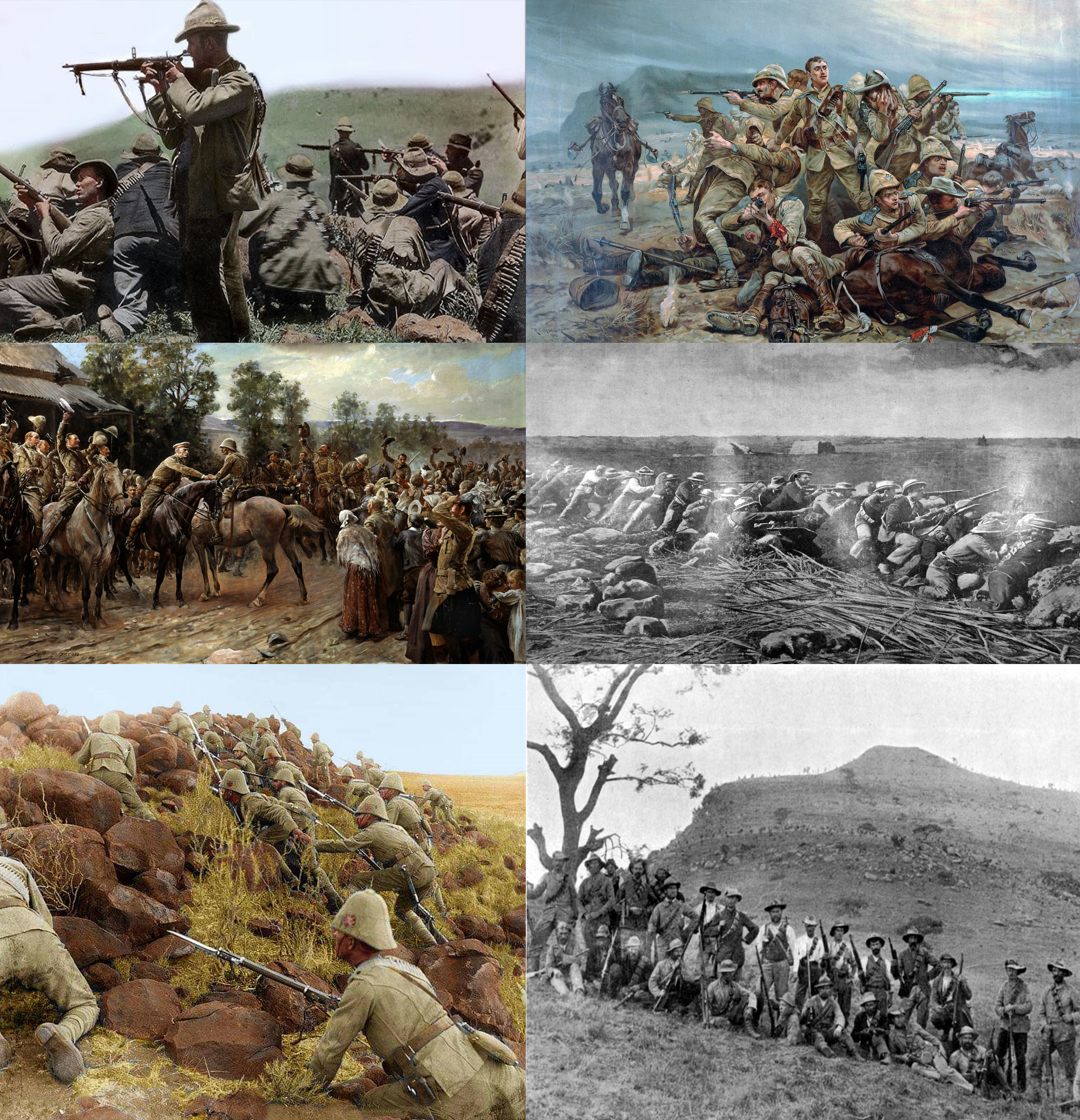
- Clockwise from top left: Boers in action at the Second Battle of Colenso; The 17th Lancers holding off an attack at Elands River; Boers at the besieged city of Mafeking; Boer militia at the Battle of Spion Kop; Canadian troops during the Battle of Paardeberg; General Redvers Buller entering Ladysmith on 27 February 1900
Date	11 October 1899 – 31 May 1902 (2 years, 7 months, 2 weeks, and 6 days)
Location	Southern Africa (Note: Present-day South Africa, Lesotho, and Eswatini.)
Result	British victory: Invasion and dissolution of the South African Republic and Orange Free State; Treaty of Vereeniging
Territorial changes	The Boer republics are absorbed into the British Empire in accordance with the Treaty of Vereeniging.

Belligerents
United Kingdom and Empire: Cape Colony; Natal Colony; Basutoland; Bechuanaland; Rhodesia; India; Ceylon; Canada; New Zealand; New South Wales (until 1901); Western Australia (until 1901); Tasmania (until 1901); South Australia (until 1901); Victoria (until 1901); Queensland (until 1901); Australia (from 1901) (Note: Following Federation in 1901)	South African Republic; Orange Free State; (Volkstaat) Cape Boers; Foreign volunteers: Australia; Austria-Hungary; Belgium; Denmark; France; Germany; Greece; Ireland (Note: Ireland was part of the British Empire at the time, but there were volunteers who helped the foreign volunteers); Italy; Netherlands; Poland; Russia; Sweden-Norway; United States

Commanders and leaders
Robert Gascoyne-Cecil; Joseph Chamberlain; Alfred Milner; Frederick Roberts; William Robertson; Paul Methuen; Redvers Buller; Herbert Kitchener; Robert Baden-Powell; Herbert Plumer; Andrew Wauchope †; Penn Symons (DOW); Edward Woodgate †; (United Kingdom of Great Britain and Ireland) John French; (United Kingdom of Great Britain and Ireland) Thomas Kenny; (United Kingdom of Great Britain and Ireland) Harry "Breaker" Morant; William Otter; Sam Steele; François Lessard; Walter Tunbridge	Paul Kruger; Koos de la Rey; Louis Botha; Schalk Burger; Piet Cronjé; Piet Joubert †; Jan Smuts; Lucas Meyer; Johannes Kock †; Adolf Schiel; Hendrik Prinsloo †; Joachim Fourie †; Jacobus Snyman; (South African Republic) Sarel Oosthuizen †; (South African Republic) Ferdinandus Potgieter †; (South African Republic) Jan Kemp; Camillo Ricchiardi; Martinus Steyn; Christiaan de Wet; Naas Ferreira †; Jan Olivier; Cornelius Wessels; (Orange Free State) Petrus Liebenberg

Strength
Imperial: 365,693; Native African auxiliaries: 100,000; Colonial: 82,742; In total: 448,435	Boer Commandos: 25,000 (Transvaal Boers); 15,000 (Free State Boers); 6–7,000 (Cape Boers); Native African auxiliaries: 10,000; Foreign volunteers: 5,400+; In total: 87,365

Casualties and losses
22,092 dead (Note: 5,774 killed in battle; 2,108 died of wounds; 14,210 died of disease); 75,430 returned home sick or wounded 934 missing 2,006 captured Total: 101,290	6,189 dead (Note: 3,990 killed in battle; 157 died in accidents; 924 of wounds and disease; 1,118 while prisoners of war.); 24,000 captured (sent overseas); 110 missing 21,256 bitter-enders surrendered (at the end of the war); Total: 51,555
- Civilian casualties: 46,370 fatalities 26,370 Boer women and children died in concentration camps 20,000+ Indigenous Africans of the 115,000 interned in separate concentration camps.

The Second Boer War (Note: (Afrikaans: Tweede Vryheidsoorloglit. 'Second Freedom War', 11 October 1899 – 31 May 1902), also known as the Boer War, Transvaal War, Anglo–Boer War, or the South African War.) was a conflict fought between 1899 and 1902 between the British Empire and the Boer republics (the South African Republic and Orange Free State), triggered by the discovery of gold in the Transvaal, specifically the Witwatersrand gold fields, and the ensuing political dispute over the voting rights of British expatriates (Uitlanders).

In 1877, the British annexed the bankrupt Transvaal, and the British military neutralized the regional threat of the Zulu Kingdom in 1879 in the Anglo-Zulu War. With their borders secure, the Boers subsequently revolted and regained their independence after defeating the British in the First Boer War (1880–1881).

The Witwatersrand Gold Rush caused an influx of "foreigners" (Uitlanders), most of them are British from the Cape Colony, to the South African Republic (SAR), an independent Boer Republic. As they were permitted to vote only after 14 years' residence, they protested to the British authorities in the Cape. Negotiations failed at the botched Bloemfontein Conference in June 1899. The conflict broke out in October after the British government decided to send 10,000 troops.

The war had three phases. In the first, the Boers mounted preemptive strikes into British-held territory in Natal and the Cape Colony, besieging British garrisons at Ladysmith, Mafeking, and Kimberley. The Boers won victories at Stormberg, Magersfontein, Colenso and Spion Kop. In the second phase, British fortunes changed when their commanding officer, General Redvers Buller, was replaced by Lord Roberts and Lord Kitchener, who relieved the besieged cities and invaded the Boer republics at the head of a 180,000-strong expeditionary force. The Boers, aware that they were unable to resist such a force, refrained from fighting pitched battles, thereby allowing the British to occupy both republics and their capitals. Boer politicians fled or went into hiding; the British annexed the two republics in 1900. In Britain, the Conservative ministry attempted to capitalise by calling an early general election, dubbed a "khaki election". In the third phase, Boer fighters launched a guerrilla campaign. They used hit-and-run attacks and ambushes against the British for two years.

The guerrilla campaign proved difficult for the British to defeat, due to unfamiliarity with tactics and support among civilians. British high command ordered scorched earth policies as part of a counterinsurgency campaign. Over 100,000 Boer civilians were forcibly relocated into concentration camps, where 26,000 died, by starvation and disease. Native Africans were interned to prevent them from supplying the Boers; 20,000 died. British mounted infantry were deployed to track down guerrillas, and few combatants were killed in action, most dying from disease. Kitchener offered terms to remaining Boer leaders to end the conflict. Eager to ensure Boers were released from the camps, most Boer commanders accepted the terms in the Treaty of Vereeniging, surrendering in May 1902. The former republics were transformed into the British colonies of the Transvaal and Orange River, and in 1910 were merged with the Natal and Cape Colonies to form the Union of South Africa, a self-governing colony within the British Empire.

British expeditionary efforts were aided significantly by colonial forces from the Cape Colony, the Natal, Rhodesia, and many volunteers from the British Empire. Native African recruits contributed increasingly to the British effort. International public opinion was sympathetic to the Boers and hostile to the British. Even within the UK, there existed significant opposition to the war. As a result, the Boer cause attracted volunteers from neutral countries, including the German Empire, the United States, Russia and parts of the British Empire, such as Australia and Ireland. Some consider the war the beginning of questioning the British Empire's global dominance, due to the war's surprising duration and unforeseen losses suffered by the British. A trial for British war crimes, including the killings of civilians and prisoners of war, was opened in January 1902. The war had a lasting effect on the region and on British domestic politics.

== Name ==
A typical British soldier. Corporal Alexander Turnbull of Kitchener's Fighting Scouts

The conflict is commonly referred to simply as "the Boer War" because the First Boer War (1880–81) was much smaller. Boer (meaning "farmer") is the common name for Afrikaans-speaking white South Africans descended from the Dutch East India Company's settlers at the Cape of Good Hope. Among some South Africans, it is known as the (Second) Anglo–Boer War. In Afrikaans, it is called the 'Tweede Vryheidsoorlog ("Second Freedom War"), 'Tweede Boereoorlog ("Second Boer War"), Anglo–Boereoorlog ("Anglo–Boer War") or Engelse oorlog ("English War").

In South Africa, it is officially called the South African War. According to a 2011 BBC report, "most scholars prefer to call the war of 1899–1902 the South African War, thereby acknowledging that all South Africans, white and black, were affected by the war and that many were participants".

== Origins ==
The war's origins were complex and stemmed from a century of conflict between the Boers and Britain. Of immediate importance, however, was the question of who would control and benefit most from the lucrative Witwatersrand gold mines discovered in 1884.

=== European settlement ===
The first European settlement in South Africa was founded at the Cape of Good Hope in 1652, and administered as part of the Dutch Cape Colony. As a result of political turmoil in the Netherlands, the British occupied the Cape three times during the Napoleonic Wars, and the occupation became permanent after the Battle of Blaauwberg in 1806. The colony was then home to about 26,000 colonists settled under Dutch rule. Most represented old Dutch families brought to the Cape during the late 17th and early 18th centuries. Broadly speaking, the colonists included distinct subgroups, including the Boers. The Boers were itinerant farmers who lived on the colony's frontiers, seeking better pastures for their livestock. Many were dissatisfied with aspects of British administration, in particular with Britain's abolition of slavery in 1834. Boers who used forced labor were unable to collect compensation for their slaves.

Between 1836 and 1852, many elected to migrate away from British rule in what became known as the Great Trek. Around 15,000 trekking Boers departed the Cape Colony and followed the eastern coast towards Natal. After Britain annexed Natal in 1843, they journeyed farther north into South Africa's eastern interior. There, they established two independent Boer republics: the South African Republic (1852; also known as the Transvaal Republic) and the Orange Free State (1854).

=== Scramble for Africa ===
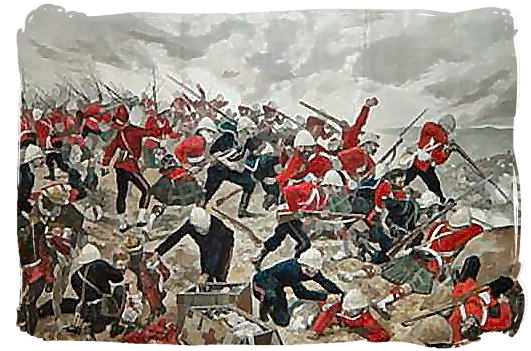
Boer victory over the British at the Battle of Majuba Hill, First Boer War, 1881

The southern part of Africa was dominated in the 19th century by a set of struggles to create within it a single unified state. In 1868, Britain annexed Basutoland in the Drakensberg Mountains, following an appeal from Moshoeshoe I, the king of the Sotho people, who sought British protection against the Boers. While the Berlin Conference of 1884–1885 sought to draw boundaries between the European powers' African possessions, it also set the stage for further scrambles. Britain attempted to annex first the South African Republic in 1880, and then, in 1899, both the South African Republic and the Orange Free State.

In the 1880s, Bechuanaland (modern Botswana) became the object of a dispute between the Germans to the west, the Boers to the east, and Britain's Cape Colony to the south. Although Bechuanaland had no economic value, the "Missionaries Road" passed through it towards territory farther north. After the Germans annexed Damaraland and Namaqualand (modern Namibia) in 1884, Britain annexed Bechuanaland in 1885.

By 1877, the Transvaal government under President Thomas François Burgers was completely bankrupt due to the failed Pedi War and mounting foreign debts. When British official Sir Theophilus Shepstone annexed the republic in April of that year, the state treasury contained only 12 shillings and 6 pence.

In the First Boer War of 1880–1881 the Boers of the Transvaal Republic proved skilful fighters in resisting Britain's attempt at annexation, causing a series of British defeats. The British government of William Ewart Gladstone was unwilling to become mired in a distant war, requiring substantial troop reinforcement and expense, for what was perceived at the time to be a minimal return. An armistice ended the war, and subsequently a peace treaty was signed with the Transvaal President Paul Kruger.

=== Witwatersrand Gold Rush ===
In June 1884, British imperial interests were ignited in the discovery by Jan Gerrit Bantjes of what would prove to be the world's largest deposit of gold ore at an outcrop on a ridge 69 km (43 mi) south of the Boer capital at Pretoria. The ridge was known locally as the "Witwatersrand" (white water ridge, a watershed). A gold rush to the Transvaal brought thousands of British and other prospectors from around the globe and over the border from the Cape Colony, which had been under British control since 1806.

Gold Production on the Witwatersrand 1898 to 1910
Year	No. of Mines	Gold output (fine ounces)	Value (£)	Relative 2024 value (£)
1898	77	4,295,608	£15,141,376	£2.105×10^{9}
1899 (Jan–Oct)	85	3,946,545	£14,046,686	£1.952×10^{9}
1899 (Nov) – 1901 (Apr)	12	574,043	£2,024,278	£281,000,000
1901 (May–Dec)	12	238,994	£1,014,687	£141,000,000
1902	45	1,690,100	£7,179,074	£998,000,000
1903	56	2,859,482	£12,146,307	£1.688×10^{9}
1904	62	3,658,241	£15,539,219	£2.160×10^{9}
1905	68	4,706,433	£19,991,658	£2.779×10^{9}

The city of Johannesburg sprang up nearly overnight as a shanty town. Uitlanders (foreigners, white outsiders) poured in and settled around the mines. The influx was so rapid that uitlanders quickly outnumbered the Boers in Johannesburg and along the Rand, although they remained a minority in the Transvaal. The Boers, nervous and resentful of the uitlanders' growing presence, sought to contain their influence through requiring lengthy residential qualifying periods before voting rights could be obtained; by imposing taxes on the gold industry; and introducing controls through licensing, tariffs and administrative requirements. Among the issues giving rise to tension between the Transvaal government on the one hand and the uitlanders and British interests on the other, were:

- Established uitlanders, including the mining magnates, wanted political, social, and economic control over their lives. These rights included a stable constitution, a fair franchise law, an independent judiciary and a better educational system. The Boers recognised that the more concessions they made to the uitlanders the greater the likelihood—with approximately 30,000 white male Boer voters and potentially 60,000 white male uitlanders—that their independent control of the Transvaal would be lost, and the territory absorbed into the British Empire.
- The uitlanders resented the taxes levied by the Transvaal government, particularly when this was not spent on Johannesburg or uitlander interests but diverted to projects elsewhere in the Transvaal. For example, as the gold-bearing ore sloped away from the outcrop underground to the south, more and more blasting was necessary to extract it, and mines consumed vast quantities of explosives. A box of dynamite costing five pounds included five shillings tax. Not only was this tax perceived as exorbitant, but British interests were offended when President Paul Kruger gave monopoly rights for the manufacture of the explosive to a non-British branch of the Nobel company, which infuriated Britain. The so-called "dynamite monopoly" became a casus belli.

British imperial interests were alarmed when in 1894–95 Kruger proposed building a railway through Portuguese East Africa to Delagoa Bay, bypassing British-controlled ports in Natal and Cape Town and avoiding British tariffs. The Prime Minister of the Cape Colony was Cecil Rhodes, a man driven by a vision of a British-controlled Africa extending from the Cape to Cairo. Uitlander representatives and British mine owners became increasingly frustrated and angered by their dealings with the Transvaal government. A Reform Committee (Transvaal) was formed to represent the uitlanders.

=== Jameson Raid ===
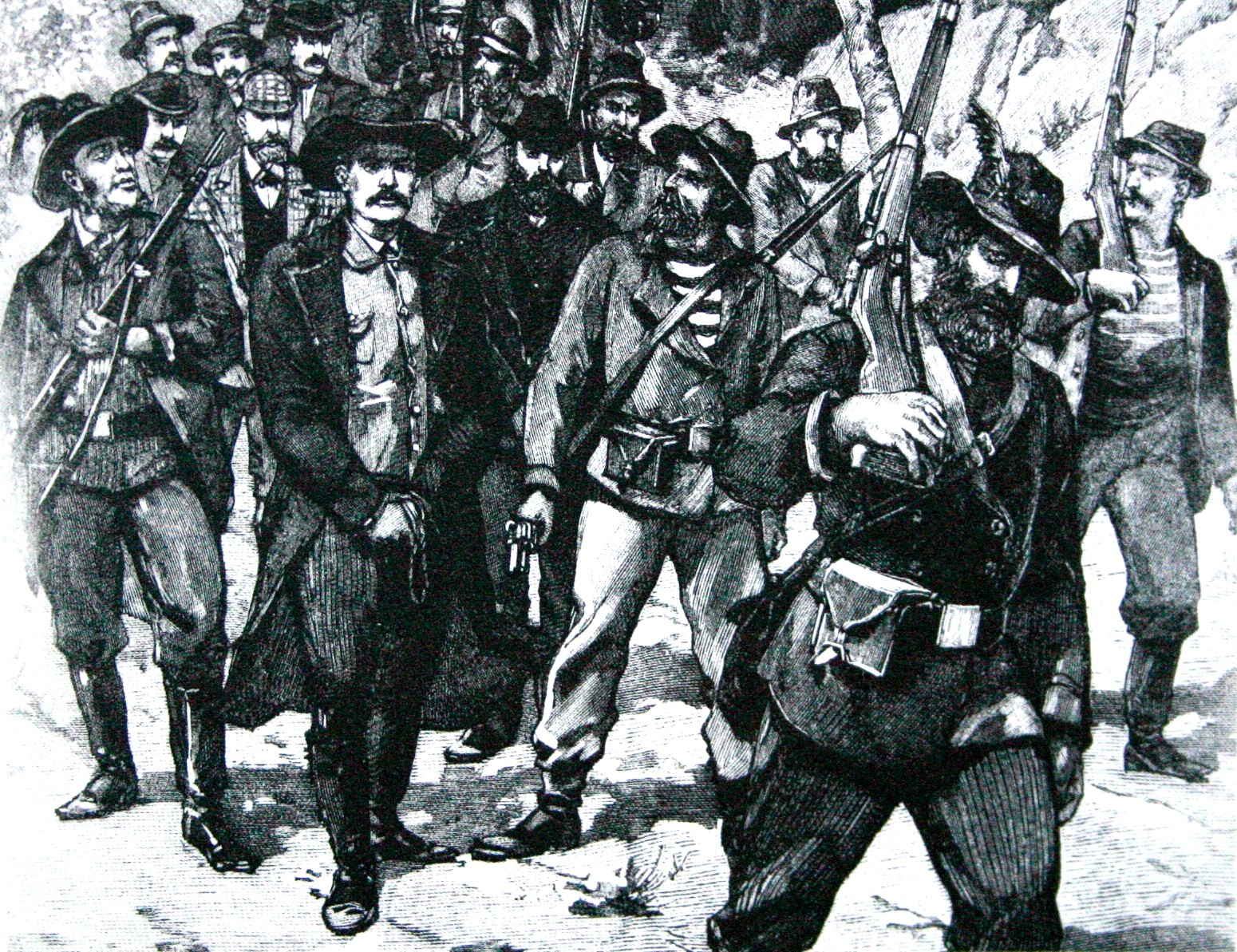
A sketch showing the arrest of Leander Starr Jameson after the failed Jameson raid, in 1896

In 1895, a plan to take Johannesburg, and end the control of the Transvaal government, was hatched with the connivance of Cape Prime Minister Rhodes and Johannesburg gold magnate Alfred Beit. A column of 600 armed men was led over the border from Bechuanaland towards Johannesburg by Leander Starr Jameson, the Administrator in Rhodesia of the British South Africa Company, of which Rhodes was the chairman. The column, mainly made up of Rhodesian and Bechuanaland British South Africa Policemen, was equipped with Maxim machine guns and artillery pieces.

The plan was to make a three-day dash to Johannesburg and trigger an uprising by the primarily British expatriate uitlanders, organised by the Johannesburg Reform Committee, before the Boer commandos could mobilise. However, the Transvaal authorities had warning of the raid and tracked it from when it crossed the border. Four days later, the dispirited column was surrounded near Krugersdorp, within sight of Johannesburg. After a skirmish in which the column lost 65 killed and wounded—while the Boers lost one man—Jameson's men surrendered and were arrested.

The botched raid had repercussions throughout southern Africa and Europe. In Rhodesia, the departure of so many policemen enabled the Matabele and Mashona peoples' rising against the British South Africa Company. The rebellion, known as the Second Matabele War, was suppressed only at a great cost.

A few days after the raid, the German Kaiser sent the "Kruger telegram", congratulating President Kruger and the government of the South African Republic on their success. When the text was disclosed in the British press, it generated a storm of anti-German feeling. In the baggage of the raiding column, to the embarrassment of Britain, the Boers found telegrams from Rhodes and other plotters in Johannesburg. Chamberlain had approved Rhodes' plans to send armed assistance in the case of a Johannesburg uprising, but he quickly moved to condemn the raid. Rhodes was censured at the Cape and London parliamentary inquiries, and forced to resign as Prime Minister and Chairman of the British South Africa Company.

The Boer government handed their prisoners over to the British for trial. Jameson was tried in England, where the press and London society, inflamed by anti-Boer and anti-German feeling and in a frenzy of jingoism, treated him as a hero. Although sentenced to 15 months imprisonment, Jameson was rewarded by being named Prime Minister of the Cape Colony (1904–08) and ultimately anointed as one of the founders of the Union of South Africa. For conspiring with Jameson, the uitlander members of the Reform Committee (Transvaal) were tried in the Transvaal courts and found guilty of treason. The four leaders were sentenced to death, but this was commuted to 15 years' imprisonment. In 1896, the other members of the committee were released on payment of £2,000 in fines, all paid by Rhodes. One Reform Committee member, Frederick Gray, committed suicide while in Pretoria jail. His death was a factor in softening the Transvaal government's attitude to the surviving prisoners.

Jan C. Smuts wrote, in 1906:

The Jameson Raid was the real declaration of war ... And that is so in spite of the four years of truce that followed ... [the] aggressors consolidated their alliance ... the defenders on the other hand silently and grimly prepared for the inevitable".

The raid alienated many Cape Afrikaners from Britain and united the Transvaal Boers behind President Kruger and his government. It drew the Transvaal and Orange Free State together in opposition to British imperialism. In 1897, the two republics concluded a military pact.

=== Arming the Boers ===
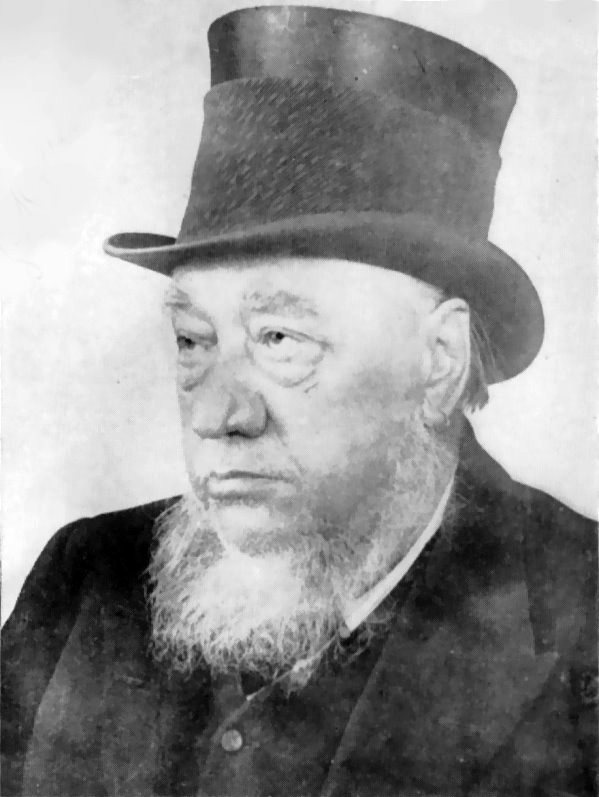
Paul Kruger, leader of the South African Republic (Transvaal)

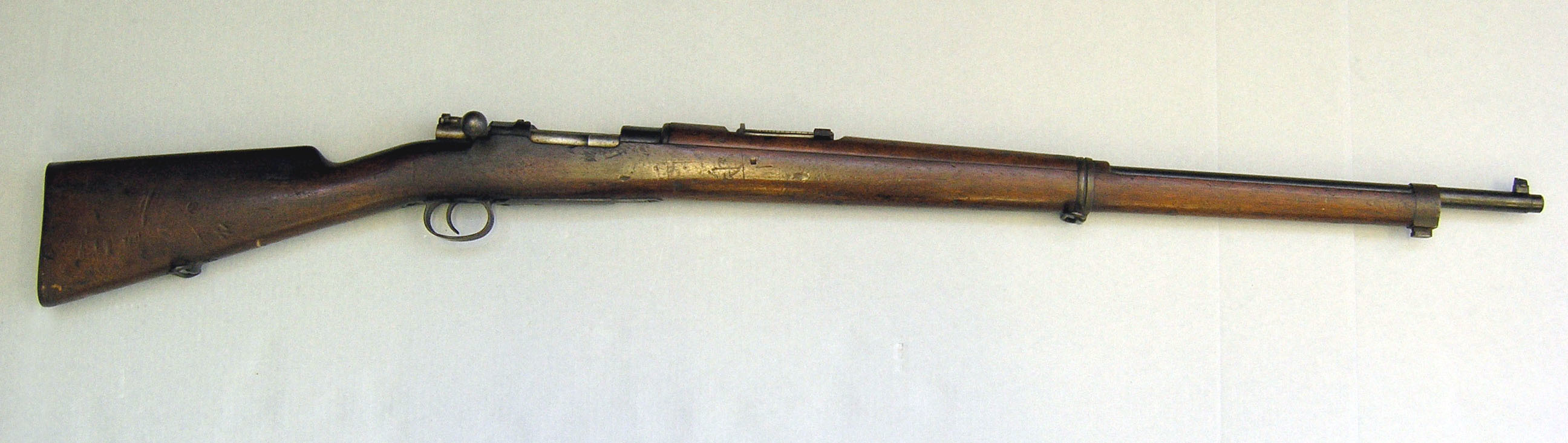
Mauser 1895 bolt-action rifle (at the Auckland Museum)

Kruger re-equipped the Transvaal army, importing 37,000 of the latest 7x57 mm Mauser Model 1895 rifles supplied by Germany, and 40 to 50 million rounds of ammunition. Some commandos used the Martini-Henry Mark III, because thousands of these had been purchased. Unfortunately, the large puff of white smoke after firing gave away the shooter's position. Roughly 7,000 Guedes 1885 rifles had also been purchased a few years earlier, and these were also used during the hostilities.

As the war went on, some commandos relied on captured British rifles, such as the Lee-Metford and Enfield. When the ammunition for the Mausers ran out, the Boers relied primarily on the captured Lee-Metfords. Few Boers used bayonets.

The Boers also purchased the best European German Krupp artillery. By October 1899, the Transvaal State Artillery had 73 heavy guns, including four 155 mm Creusot fortress guns and 25 of the 37 mm Maxim Nordenfeldt guns. The Boers' Maxim, larger than the British Maxims, was a large calibre, belt-fed, water-cooled "auto cannon" that fired explosive rounds at 450 rounds per minute. It became known as the "Pom Pom".

The Transvaal army was transformed: approximately 25,000 men equipped with modern rifles and artillery could mobilise within two weeks. However, Kruger's victory in the Jameson Raid did nothing to resolve the fundamental problem of finding a formula to conciliate the uitlanders, without surrendering the independence of the Transvaal.

=== British case for war ===
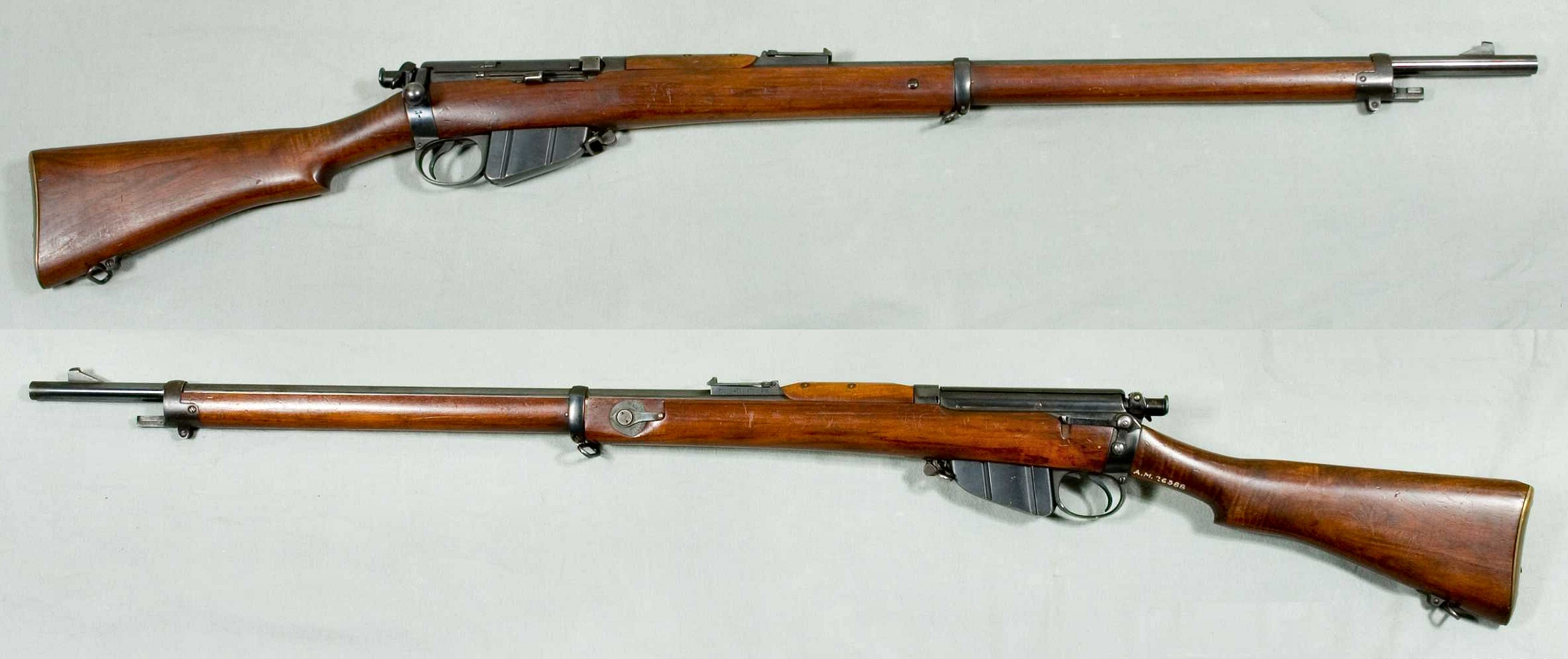
A British Lee–Metford rifle used by British troops during the Second Boer War

The failure to gain improved rights for uitlanders (notably the dynamite tax) became a pretext for war and justification for a military build-up in Cape Colony. The case for war was developed and espoused as far away as the Australian colonies. Cape Colony Governor Sir Alfred Milner; Rhodes; Chamberlain; and mining syndicate owners such as Beit, Barney Barnato, and Lionel Phillips, favoured annexation of the Boer republics. Confident that the Boers would be quickly defeated, they planned and organised a short war, citing the uitlanders' grievances as the motivation. In contrast, the influence of the war party within the British government was limited. Prime Minister Lord Salisbury despised jingoism. He was uncertain of the abilities of the British Army. Despite his moral and practical reservations, Salisbury led the UK to war to preserve the Empire's prestige and a feeling of obligation to British South Africans. (Note: Salisbury felt that the Transvaal, the Orange Free State, and Cape Boers aspired to a "Dutch South Africa". The achievement of such a state would damage British imperial prestige) Salisbury detested the Boer treatment of native Africans, referring to the London Convention of 1884, following Britain's defeat in the first war, as an agreement "really in the interest of slavery". Salisbury was not alone in this. Roger Casement, already on the way to becoming an Irish Nationalist, was nevertheless happy to gather intelligence for the British against the Boers because of their cruelty to Africans.

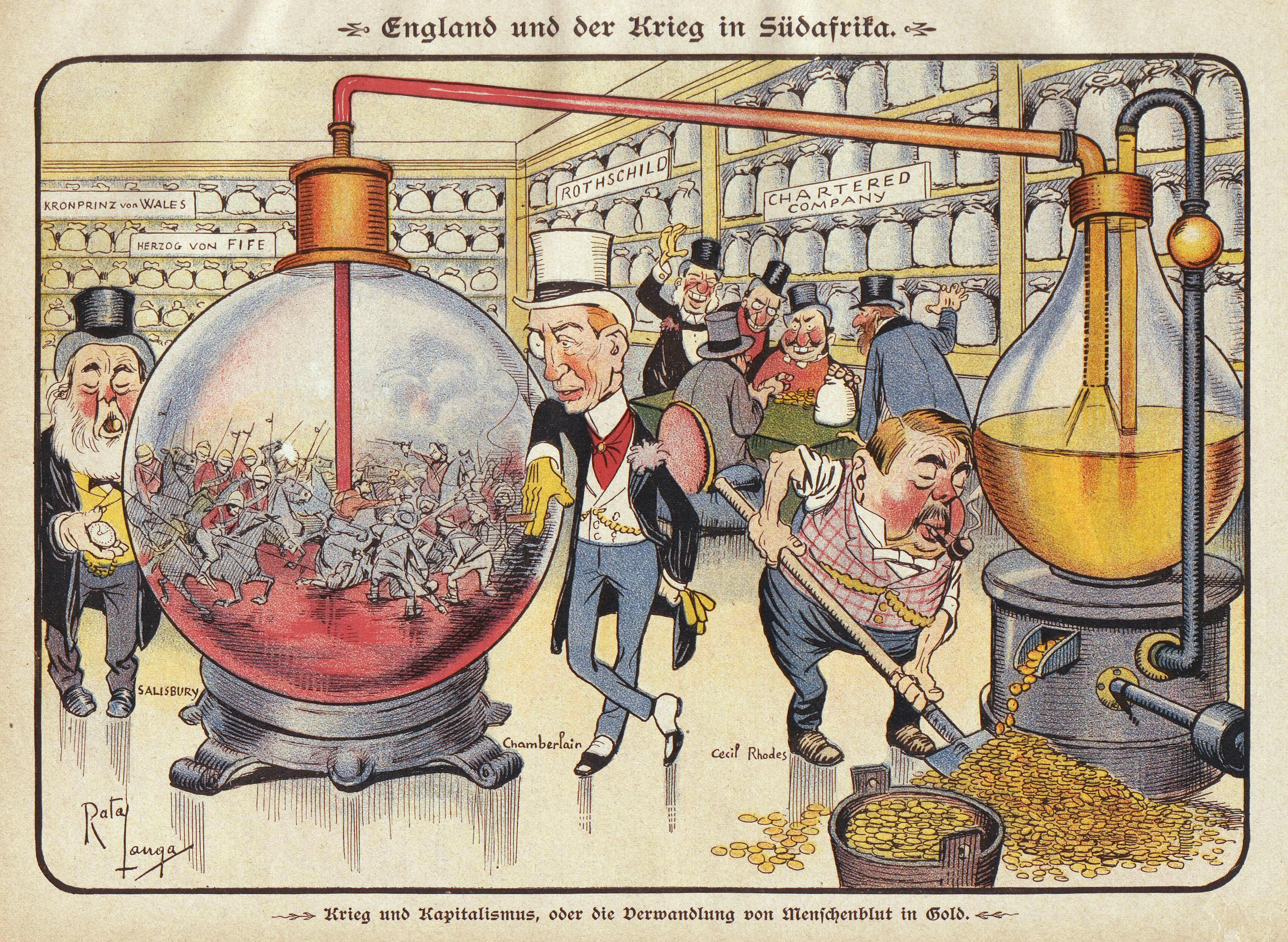
1899 German political cartoon: "War and Capitalism, or the transformation of human blood into gold"

The British government went against the advice of its generals and declined to send substantial reinforcements to South Africa before war broke out. Secretary of State for War Lansdowne did not believe the Boers were preparing for war and that if Britain were to send large numbers of troops, it would strike too aggressive a posture and possibly derail a negotiated settlement—or even encourage a Boer attack.

=== Negotiations fail ===
Steyn of the Orange Free State invited Milner and Kruger to attend a conference in Bloemfontein. The conference started on 30 May 1899, but negotiations quickly broke down, as Kruger had no intention of granting meaningful concessions, and Milner had no intention of accepting his normal delaying tactics.

On 9 October 1899, after convincing the Orange Free State to join him and mobilising their forces, Kruger issued an ultimatum giving Britain 48 hours to withdraw troops from the border of Transvaal, despite the fact the only regular British troops near the border of either republic were 4 companies deployed to defend Kimberley. Otherwise, the Transvaal, allied with the Orange Free State, would declare war. News of the ultimatum reached London on the day it expired. The editor of the Times purportedly laughed out loud when he read it, saying 'an official document is seldom amusing and useful yet this was both'. The Times denounced the ultimatum as an 'extravagant farce' and The Globe denounced this 'trumpery little state'. Most editorials were similar to the Daily Telegraph's, which declared: 'of course there can only be one answer to this grotesque challenge. Kruger has asked for war and war he must have!'

Such views were far from those of the British government and the army. Army reform had been a matter of pressing concern since the 1870s, put off because the public did not want the expense of a larger, more professional army and because a large home army was not politically welcome. The Prime Minister had to tell a surprised Queen Victoria that 'We have no army capable of meeting even a second-class Continental Power'.

== First phase: The Boer offensive, October–December 1899 ==
=== British Army deployed ===
When war with the Boers seemed imminent in September 1899, a Field Force, referred to as the Army Corps was mobilised and sent to Cape Town. It was "about the equivalent of the I Army Corps of the existing mobilization scheme" and was placed under the command of Gen Sir Redvers Buller, general officer commanding-in-chief of Aldershot Command. In South Africa the corps never operated as such and the 1st, 2nd, 3rd divisions were widely dispersed.

Speaking to Alistair McAlpine in the 1950s, participating soldier Lord Morley (1878–1962) recounted his deployment from Southampton:

His regiment was paraded on the dock, as Queen Victoria was to inspect them before they left. Up and down the ranks the Queen progressed, stiff as a ramrod until she came opposite the young Lord Morley. Turning to an aide, she rested her hand on his shoulder and dabbed tears from her eyes. 'My fine young men all going to war', the Queen murmured, 'so few of them will ever come back'. Lord Morley told me that he did not find the Queen's words reassuring as he boarded the liner that was to take him and his regiment to South Africa.

=== Boer organization and skills ===
War was declared on 11 October with a Boer offensive into the British-held Natal and Cape Colony areas. The Boers had about 33,000 soldiers, and outnumbered the British, who could move only 13,000 troops to the front line. The Boers had no problems with mobilisation, since the independent Boers had no regular army units, apart from the Staatsartillerie (Dutch for 'State Artillery'). As with the First Boer War, since most of the Boers were members of civilian militias, none had adopted uniforms or insignia. Only the members of the Staatsartillerie wore light green uniforms.

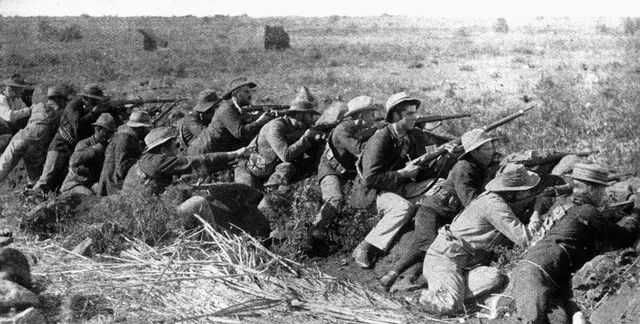
Boers in a trench at Mafeking, 1899

When danger loomed, all the burgers (citizens) in a district would form a military unit called a commando and elect officers. A full-time official called a Veldkornet maintained muster rolls but had no disciplinary powers. Each man brought his own weapon, usually a hunting rifle, and horse. Those who could not afford a gun were given one by the authorities. The presidents of the Transvaal and Orange Free State simply signed decrees to concentrate within a week, and the commandos could muster between 30,000-40,000 men. Many did not look forward to fighting against fellow Christians and, by and large, fellow Protestants. Many had an overly optimistic sense of what the war would involve, imagining victory could be achieved as fast and easily as in the First Anglo-Boer War. Many, including many generals, had a sense their cause was holy and just, and blessed by God.

It rapidly became clear that the Boers presented the British forces with a severe tactical challenge. The Boers presented a mobile and innovative approach to warfare, drawing on their experiences from the First Boer War. The Boers who made up their commandos were farmers who had their working life in the saddle, as farmers and hunters. They depended on the pot, horse and rifle; they were skilled stalkers and marksmen. As hunters, they had learned to fire from cover; from a prone position and to make the first shot count, knowing that if they missed, the game would be long gone or could charge and potentially kill them. At community gatherings, target shooting was a major sport; they practised shooting at targets, such as hens' eggs perched on posts 100 metres (110 yd) away. They made expert mounted infantry, using cover, from which they could pour in a destructive fire using modern, smokeless, Mauser rifles. In preparation for hostilities, the Boers had acquired around 100 of the latest Krupp field guns, all horse-drawn and dispersed among the Kommando groups and several Le Creusot "Long Tom" siege guns. The Boers' skill in adapting themselves to become first-rate artillerymen shows that they were a versatile adversary. The Transvaal had an intelligence service that stretched across South Africa, and of whose extent and efficiency the British were as yet unaware.

=== Boers besiege Ladysmith, Mafeking and Kimberley ===
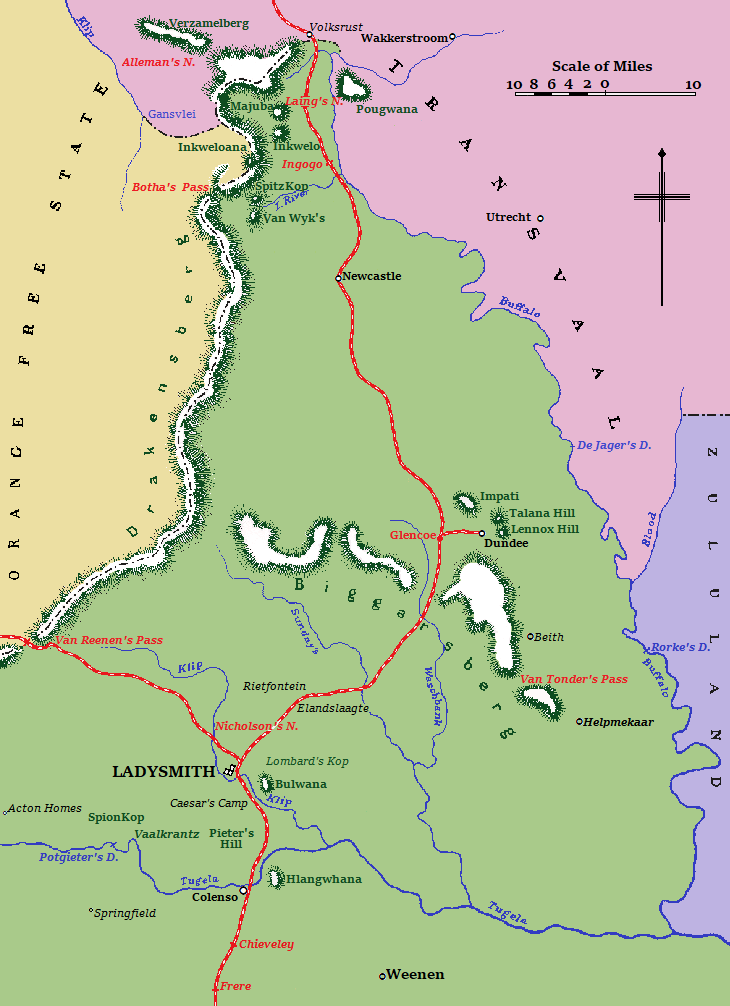
War theatre in northern Natal

The Boers struck first on 12 October at the Battle of Kraaipan, an attack that heralded the invasion of the Cape Colony and Natal between October 1899 and January 1900. With speed and surprise, the Boers drove quickly towards the British garrison at Ladysmith and the smaller ones at Mafeking and Kimberley. The quick Boer mobilisation resulted in military successes against scattered British forces. Sir George Stuart White, commanding the British division at Ladysmith, unwisely allowed Major-General Penn Symons to throw a brigade forward to the coal-mining town of Dundee (also reported as Glencoe), surrounded by hills. This became the war's first major clash, the Battle of Talana Hill. Boer guns began shelling the British camp from the summit of Talana Hill at dawn on 20 October. Penn Symons immediately counter-attacked. His infantry drove the Boers from the hill, at the cost of 446 British casualties, including Penn Symons.

Another Boer force occupied Elandslaagte, which lay between Ladysmith and Dundee. The British under Major General John French and Colonel Ian Hamilton attacked to clear the line of communications to Dundee. The resulting Battle of Elandslaagte was a clear-cut British tactical victory, but White feared more Boers were about to attack his main position and ordered a chaotic retreat from Elandslaagte, throwing away the advantage gained. The detachment from Dundee was compelled to make an exhausting cross-country retreat to rejoin White's main force. As Boers surrounded Ladysmith and opened fire with siege guns, White ordered a major sortie against them. The result was a disaster, with 140 men killed and over 1,000 captured. The siege of Ladysmith lasted months.

Meanwhile, to the north-west at Mafeking, on the border with Transvaal, Colonel Robert Baden-Powell had raised two regiments of local forces amounting to about 1,200 men in order to attack and create diversions if things went wrong further south. As a railway junction, Mafeking provided good supply facilities and was the obvious place for Baden-Powell to fortify in readiness for such attacks. However, instead of being the aggressor, Baden-Powell was forced to defend Mafeking when 6,000 Boers, commanded by Piet Cronjé, attempted a determined assault. This quickly subsided into a desultory affair, with the Boers prepared to starve the stronghold into submission. So, on 13 October, the 217-day siege of Mafeking began.

Lastly, over 360 kilometres (220 mi) to the south of Mafeking lay the diamond mining city of Kimberley, which was also subjected to a siege. Although not militarily significant, it represented an enclave of British imperialism on the borders of the Orange Free State and was hence an important Boer objective. In early November, about 7,500 Boers began their siege, again content to starve the town into submission. Despite Boer shelling, the 40,000 inhabitants, of which only 5,000 were armed, were under little threat, because the town was well-stocked with provisions. The garrison was commanded by Lieutenant Colonel Robert Kekewich, although Rhodes was also a prominent figure in the town's defences.

Siege life took its toll on the defending soldiers and civilians, as food began to grow scarce after a few weeks. In Mafeking, Sol Plaatje wrote, "I saw horseflesh for the first time being treated as a human foodstuff." The cities also dealt with constant artillery bombardment, making the streets dangerous. Near the end of the siege of Kimberley, it was expected that the Boers would intensify their bombardment, so Rhodes displayed a notice encouraging people to go down into shafts of the Kimberley Mine for protection. The townspeople panicked, and people surged into the mineshafts constantly for a 12-hour period. Although the bombardment never came, this did nothing to diminish the anxious civilians' distress. The most well-heeled of the townspeople, including Rhodes, sheltered in the Sanatorium, site of the present-day McGregor Museum; the poorer residents, notably the black population, did not have any shelter from shelling.

In retrospect, the Boers' decision to commit themselves to sieges (Sitzkrieg) was a mistake and an illustration of their lack of strategic vision. Of the seven sieges in the First Boer War, the Boers had prevailed in none. More importantly, it handed the initiative back to the British and allowed them to recover. Generally throughout the campaign, the Boers were too defensive and passive, wasting the opportunities they had for victory. Yet that passivity testified to the fact they had no desire to conquer British territory, but only to preserve their ability to rule in their own territory.

=== First British relief attempts ===
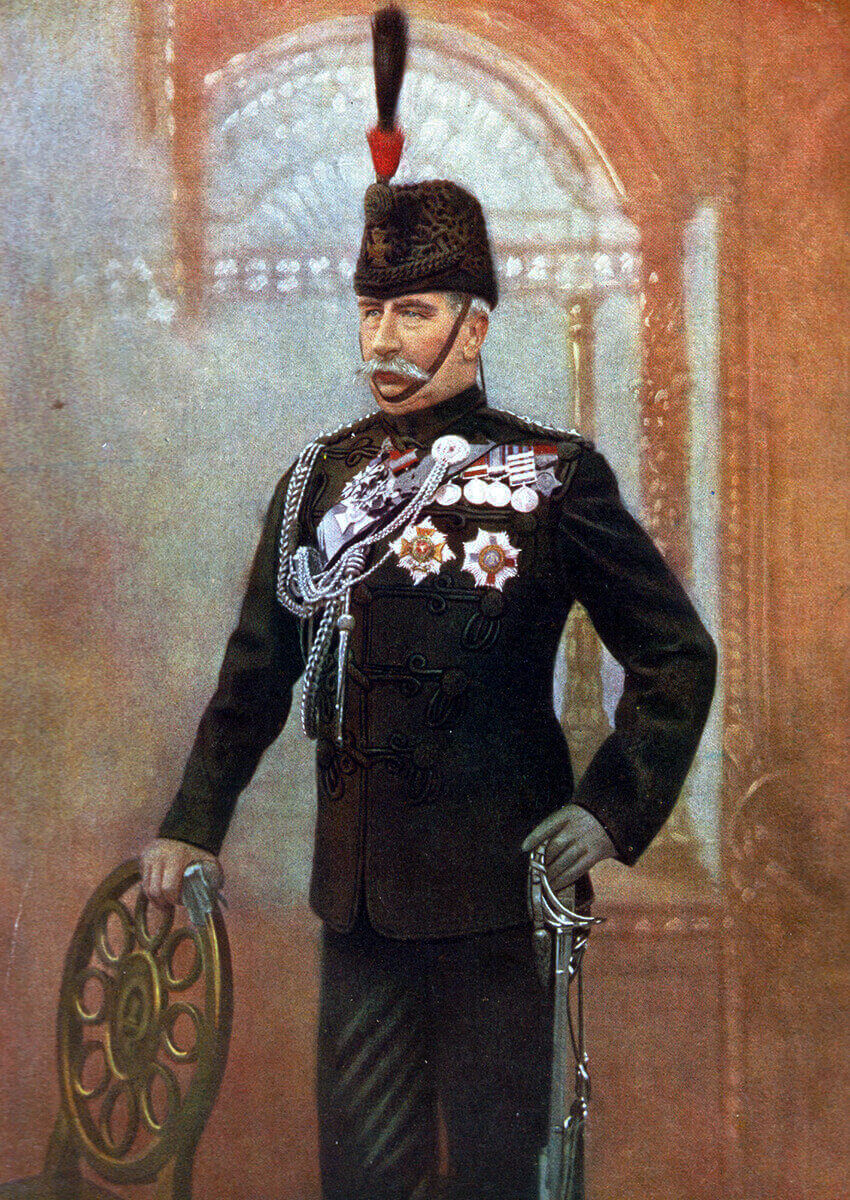
General Redvers Henry Buller launched an offensive against the Boers in the early phases of the war but after several defeats, culminating at the Battle of Colenso, he was replaced by Lord Roberts.

On 31 October 1899, General Sir Redvers Henry Buller, a much-respected commander, arrived in South Africa with the Army Corps, made up of the 1st, 2nd and 3rd divisions. Buller originally intended an offensive straight up the railway leading from Cape Town through Bloemfontein to Pretoria. Finding on arrival that British troops were under siege, he split his army corps into detachments to relieve the besieged garrisons. One division, led by Lieutenant General Lord Methuen, was to follow the Western Railway to the north and relieve Kimberley and Mafeking. A smaller force of 3,000, led by Major General William Gatacre, was to push north towards the railway junction at Stormberg and secure the Cape Midlands District from Boer raids and rebellions by Boer inhabitants. Buller led the major part of the army corps to relieve Ladysmith to the east.

The initial results of this offensive were mixed, with Methuen winning bloody skirmishes in the Battle of Belmont on 23 November, the Battle of Graspan on 25 November, and at a larger engagement, the Battle of Modder River, on 28 November resulting in British losses of 71 dead and over 400 wounded. British commanders had been trained on the lessons of the Crimean War and were adept at battalion and regimental set pieces, with columns manoeuvring in jungles, deserts and mountainous regions. What British generals failed to comprehend was the impact of destructive fire from trench positions and the mobility of cavalry raids. The British troops had antiquated tactics—and in some cases antiquated weapons—against the mobile Boer forces with the destructive fire of their modern Mausers, the latest Krupp field guns and their novel tactics. On 7 December, a raid at Enslin Station further highlighted British weaknesses, notably their supply line, which was vulnerable to guerrilla attacks.

The middle of December was disastrous for the British. In a period known as Black Week (10–15 December 1899), the British suffered defeats on three fronts. On 10 December, General Gatacre tried to recapture Stormberg railway junction about 80 kilometres (50 mi) south of the Orange River. Gatacre's attack was marked by administrative and tactical blunders and the Battle of Stormberg ended in a British defeat, with 135 killed and wounded and two guns and over 600 troops captured. At the Battle of Magersfontein on 11 December, Methuen's 14,000 British troops attempted to capture a Boer position in a dawn attack to relieve Kimberley. This too turned into a disaster when the Highland Brigade became pinned down by accurate Boer fire. After suffering from intense heat and thirst for nine hours, they eventually broke in ill-disciplined retreat. The Boer commanders, Koos de la Rey and Cronjé, had ordered trenches to be dug in an unconventional place to fool the British and give their riflemen a greater firing range. The plan worked, and this tactic helped to write the doctrine of the supremacy of the defensive position, using modern small arms and trench fortifications. The British lost 120 killed and 690 wounded and were prevented from relieving Kimberley and Mafeking. A British soldier said of the defeat:

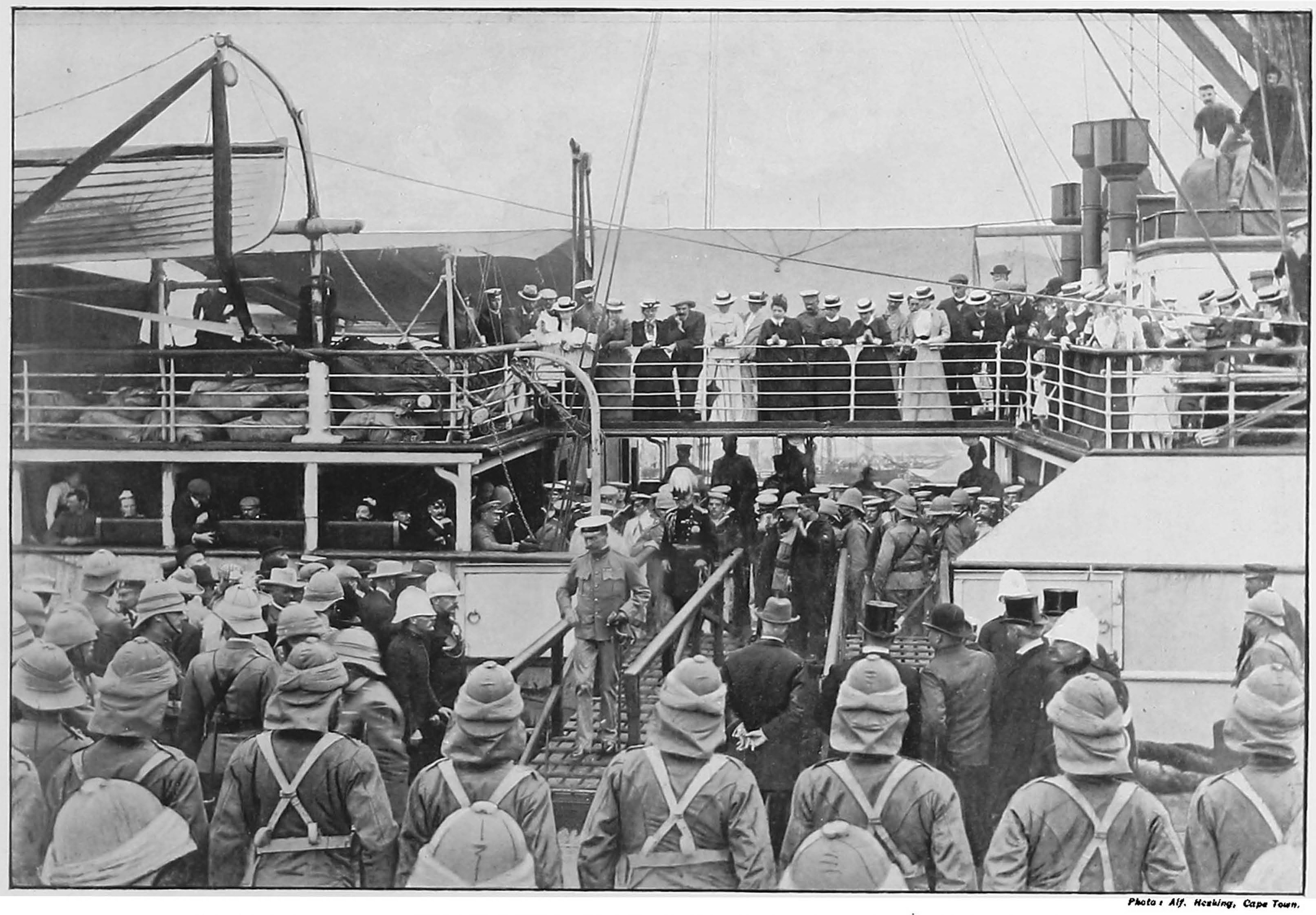
Lord Roberts's arrival at Cape Town

Such was the day for our regiment
Dread the revenge we will take.
Dearly we paid for the blunder –
A drawing-room General's mistake.
Why weren't we told of the trenches?
Why weren't we told of the wire?
Why were we marched up in column,
May Tommy Atkins enquire ...

— Private Smith (Note: From the "Battle of Magersfontein", verse by Private Smith of the Black Watch December 1899. (Quoted in Pakenham (1979))

The nadir of Black Week was the Second Battle of Colenso on 15 December, where 21,000 British troops, commanded by Buller, attempted to cross the Tugela River to relieve Ladysmith, where 8,000 Transvaal Boers under the command of Louis Botha were waiting. Through a combination of artillery and accurate rifle fire and better use of the ground, the Boers repelled British attempts to cross the river. After his first attacks failed, Buller broke off the battle and ordered a retreat, abandoning many wounded men, several isolated units and ten field guns to be captured by Botha's men. Buller's forces lost 145 men killed and 1,200 missing or wounded and the Boers suffered only 40 casualties, including 8 killed.

== Second phase: British offensive, January-September 1900 ==
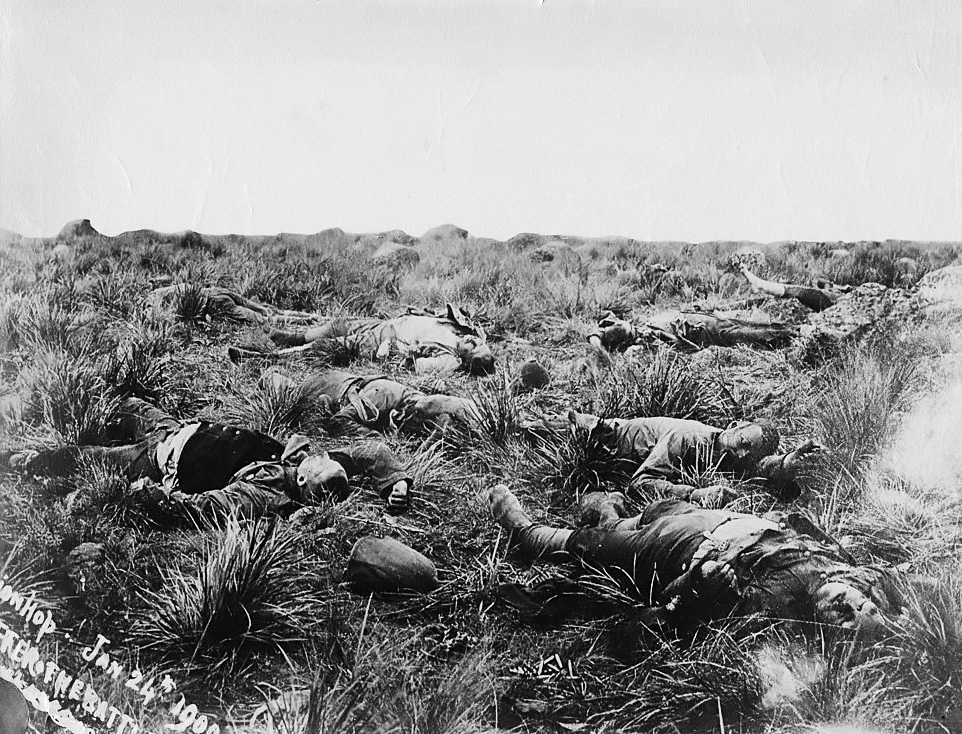
British casualties lie dead on the battlefield after the Battle of Spion Kop, 24 January 1900.

The British government took these defeats badly and with the sieges continuing was compelled to send two more divisions plus large numbers of colonial volunteers. By January 1900 this would become the largest force Britain had ever sent overseas, amounting to 180,000 men with further reinforcements being sought.

While watching for these reinforcements, Buller made another bid to relieve Ladysmith by crossing the Tugela west of Colenso. Buller's subordinate, Major General Charles Warren, successfully crossed the river, but was faced with a fresh defensive position centred on a prominent hill known as Spion Kop. In the resulting Battle of Spion Kop, British troops captured the summit by surprise during the early hours of 24 January 1900, but as the fog lifted, they realised too late that they were overlooked by Boer gun emplacements on the surrounding hills. The rest of the day resulted in a disaster caused by poor communication between Buller and his commanders. Between them they issued contradictory orders, on the one hand ordering men off the hill, while other officers ordered fresh reinforcements to defend it. The result was 350 men killed and nearly 1,000 wounded and a retreat across the Tugela River into British territory. There were nearly 300 Boer casualties.

Buller attacked Botha's position again on 5 February at Vaal Krantz and was again defeated. Buller withdrew early when it appeared that the British would be isolated in an exposed bridgehead across the Tugela, for which he was nicknamed "Sir Reverse" by some of his officers.

=== Buller replaced ===
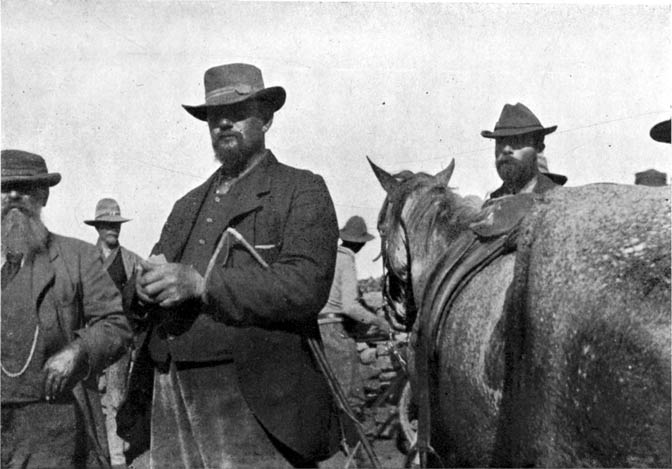
Boer General Piet de Wet, 1900

By taking command in person, Buller had allowed the overall direction of the war to drift. Because of concerns about his performance and negative reports from the field, he was replaced as Commander in Chief by Lord Roberts. Roberts assembled a new team for headquarters staff from far and wide: Lord Kitchener (Chief of Staff) from the Sudan; Frederick Russell Burnham (Chief of Scouts), the American scout, from the Klondike; George Henderson from the Staff College; Neville Bowles Chamberlain from Afghanistan; and William Nicholson (Military Secretary) from Calcutta. Like Buller, Roberts first intended to attack directly along the Cape Town–Pretoria railway but, again like Buller, was forced to relieve the beleaguered garrisons. Leaving Buller in command in Natal, Roberts massed his main force near the Orange River and along the Western Railway behind Methuen's force at the Modder River and prepared to make a wide outflanking move to relieve Kimberley.

Except in Natal, the war had stagnated. Other than a single attempt to storm Ladysmith, the Boers made no attempt to capture the besieged towns. In the Cape Midlands, the Boers did not exploit the British defeat at Stormberg and were prevented from capturing the railway junction at Colesberg. In the dry summer, the grazing on the veld became parched, weakening the Boers' horses and draught oxen, and many Boer families joined their menfolk in the siege lines and laagers (encampments), fatally encumbering Cronjé's army.

=== Roberts relieves the sieges ===
Roberts launched his main attack on 10 February 1900 and although hampered by a long supply route, managed to outflank the Boers defending Magersfontein. On 14 February, a cavalry division under French launched a major attack to relieve Kimberley. Although encountering severe fire, a massed cavalry charge split the Boer defences on 15 February, opening the way for French to enter Kimberley that evening, ending its 124 days' siege.

Meanwhile, Roberts pursued Piet Cronjé's 7,000-strong force, which had abandoned Magersfontein to head for Bloemfontein. French's cavalry was ordered to assist in the pursuit by embarking on an epic 50 km (31 mi) drive towards Paardeberg where Cronjé was attempting to cross the Modder River. At the Battle of Paardeberg from 18 to 27 February, Roberts then surrounded Cronjé's retreating Boer army. On 17 February, a pincer movement involving French's cavalry and the main British force attempted to take the entrenched position, but the frontal attacks were uncoordinated and so repulsed by the Boers. Finally, Roberts resorted to bombarding Cronjé into submission. It took ten days, and when the British troops used the polluted Modder River as water supply, typhoid killed many troops. General Cronjé was finally forced to surrender at the Battle of Paardeberg with 4,000 men.

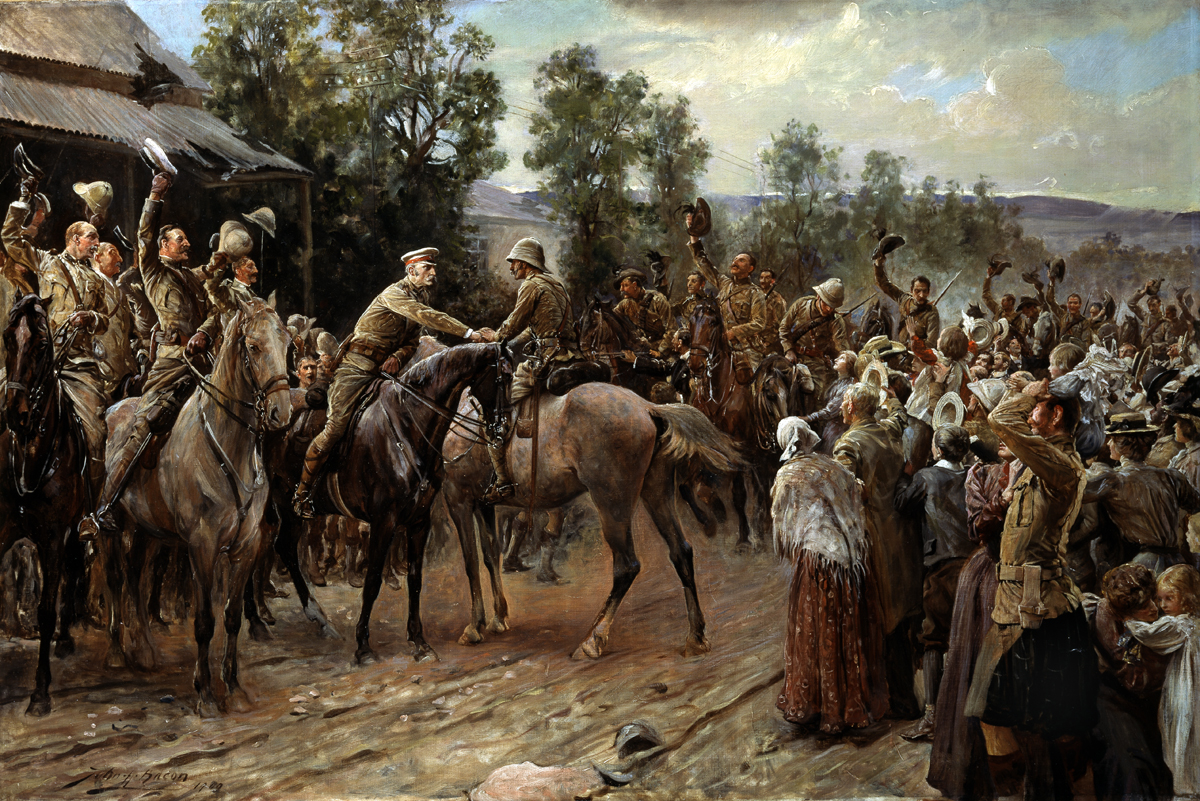
The Relief of Ladysmith. Sir George Stuart White greets Major Hubert Gough on 28 February. Painting by John Henry Frederick Bacon (1868–1914).

In Natal, the Battle of the Tugela Heights, which started on 14 February was Buller's fourth attempt to relieve Ladysmith. The losses Buller's troops had sustained convinced Buller to adopt Boer tactics "in the firing line—to advance in small rushes, covered by rifle fire from behind; to use the tactical support of artillery; and above all, to use the ground, making rock and earth work for them as it did for the enemy." Despite reinforcements his progress was painfully slow against stiff opposition. However, on 26 February, after much deliberation, Buller used all his forces in one all-out attack for the first time and succeeded in forcing a crossing of the Tugela to defeat Botha's outnumbered forces north of Colenso. After a siege lasting 118 days, the Relief of Ladysmith was effected, the day after Cronjé surrendered, but at a total cost of 7,000 British casualties. Buller's troops marched into Ladysmith on 28 February.

After a succession of defeats, the Boers realised that against such overwhelming numbers of troops, they had little chance and became demoralised. Roberts then advanced into the Orange Free State from the west, putting the Boers to flight at the Battle of Poplar Grove and capturing Bloemfontein, the capital, unopposed on 13 March with the Boer defenders escaping and scattering. Meanwhile, he detached a small force to relieve Baden-Powell. The Relief of Mafeking on 18 May 1900 provoked riotous celebrations in Britain, the origin of the Edwardian slang word "mafficking". On 28 May, the Orange Free State was annexed and renamed the Orange River Colony.

=== Capture of Pretoria ===
After being forced to delay for several weeks at Bloemfontein by a shortage of supplies, an outbreak of typhoid at Paardeberg, and poor medical care, Roberts finally resumed his advance. He was forced to halt again at Kroonstad for 10 days, due once again to the collapse of his medical and supply systems, but captured Johannesburg on 31 May and the capital of the Transvaal, Pretoria, on 5 June. Before the war, the Boers had constructed forts south of Pretoria, but the artillery had been removed from the forts for use in the field, and in the event they abandoned Pretoria without a fight. Having won the principal cities, Roberts declared the war over on 3 September 1900; and the South African Republic was formally annexed.

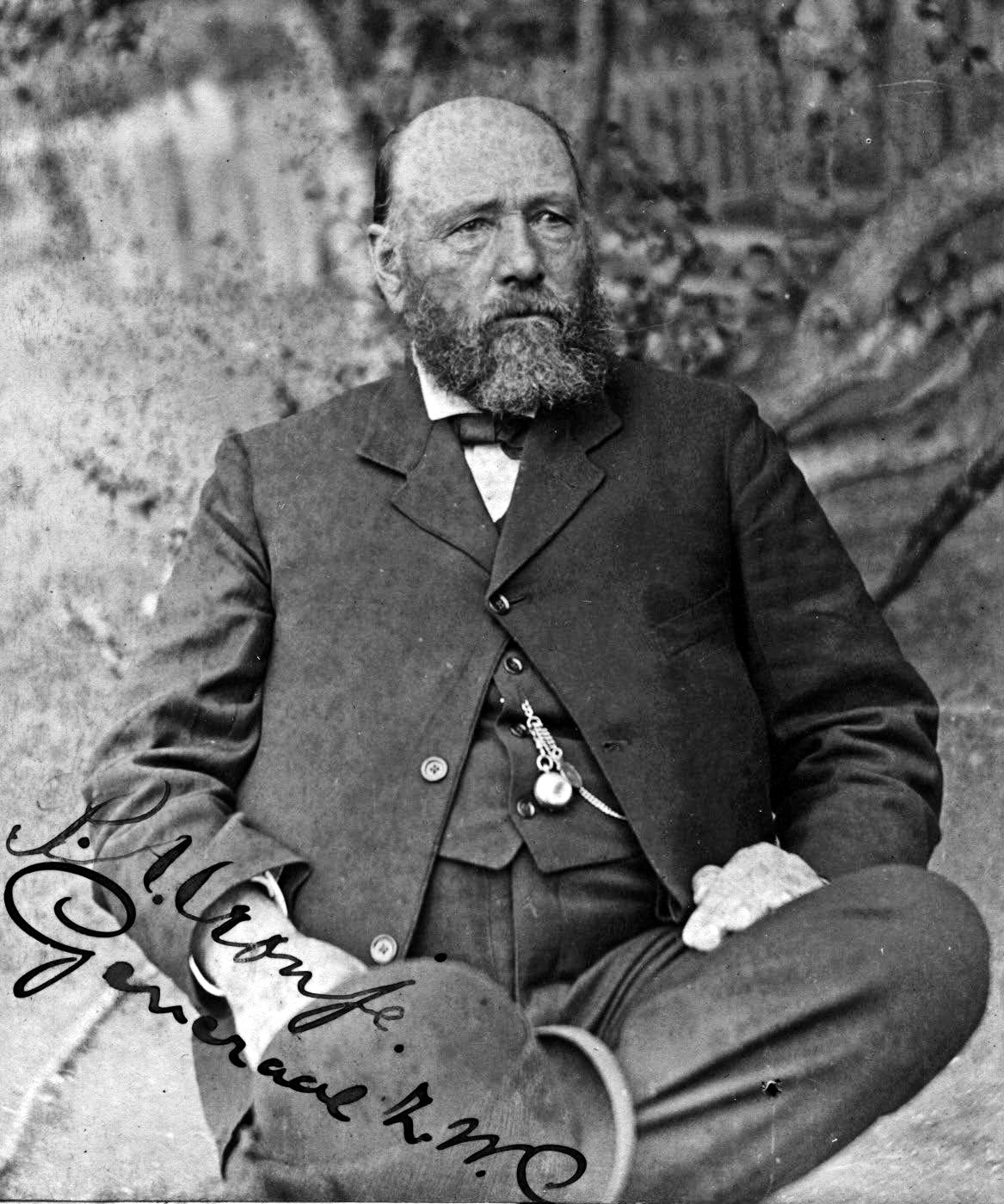
General Piet Cronjé as a prisoner of war in Saint Helena, 1900–1902. He was captured, along with 4,000 soldiers, after the loss of the Battle of Paardeberg.

British observers believed the war to be all but over after the capture of the two capitals. However, the Boers had earlier met at the temporary new capital of the Orange Free State, Kroonstad, and planned a guerrilla campaign to hit the British supply and communication lines. The first engagement of this new form of warfare was at Sanna's Post on 31 March where 1,500 Boers under the command of Christiaan de Wet attacked Bloemfontein's waterworks about 37 kilometres (23 mi) east of the city, and ambushed a heavily escorted convoy, which caused 155 British casualties and the capture of seven guns, 117 wagons, and 428 British troops.

After the fall of Pretoria, one of the last formal battles was at Diamond Hill on 11–12 June, where Roberts attempted to drive the remnants of the Boer field army under Botha beyond striking distance of Pretoria. Although Roberts drove the Boers from the hill, Botha did not regard it as a defeat, for he inflicted 162 casualties on the British while suffering only around 50 casualties.

=== Boers retreat ===
The set-piece period of the war now largely gave way to a guerrilla war, but one final operation remained. President Kruger and what remained of the Transvaal government had retreated to eastern Transvaal. Roberts, joined by troops from Natal under Buller, advanced against them, and broke their last defensive position at Bergendal on 26 August. As Roberts and Buller followed up along the railway line to Komatipoort, Kruger sought asylum in Portuguese East Africa (modern Mozambique). Some dispirited Boers did likewise, and the British gathered up much war material. However, the core of the Boer fighters under Botha easily broke back through the Drakensberg Mountains into the Transvaal highveld after riding north through the bushveld.

As Roberts's army occupied Pretoria, the Boer fighters in the Orange Free State retreated into the Brandwater Basin, a fertile area in the south-east of the Republic. This offered only temporary sanctuary, as the mountain passes leading to it could be occupied by the British, trapping the Boers. A force under General Archibald Hunter set out from Bloemfontein to achieve this in July 1900. The hard core of the Free State Boers under De Wet, accompanied by President Steyn, left the basin early. Those remaining fell into confusion and most failed to break out before Hunter trapped them. 4,500 Boers surrendered and much equipment was captured, but as with Roberts's drive against Kruger, these losses were of relatively little consequence, as the hard core of the Boer armies and their most determined and active leaders remained at large.

From the Basin, Christiaan de Wet headed west. Although hounded by British columns, he succeeded in crossing the Vaal into western Transvaal, to allow Steyn to travel to meet their leaders. There was much sympathy for the Boers in Europe. In October, President Kruger and members of the Transvaal government left Portuguese East Africa on the Dutch warship De Gelderland, sent by the Queen Wilhelmina of the Netherlands. Paul Kruger's wife, however, was too ill to travel and remained in South Africa where she died on 20 July 1901 without seeing her husband again. President Kruger first went to Marseille and then to the Netherlands, where he stayed before moving to Clarens, Switzerland, where he died in exile in 1904.

=== Prisoners of war sent overseas ===
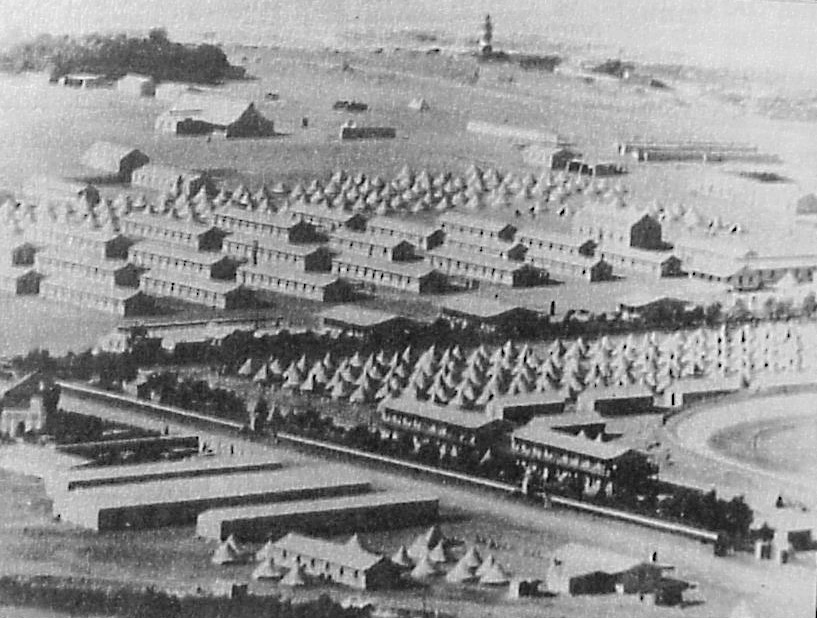
A Transit camp for Prisoners of War near Cape Town during the war. Prisoners were then transferred for internment in other parts of the British Empire.

The first sizeable batch of Boer prisoners taken by the British consisted of those captured at the Battle of Elandslaagte on 21 October 1899. Initially, these POWs were held on troopships in Simons Bay until POW camps in Cape Town and Simonstown were completed. In total, six prisoner of war camps would be set up in South Africa. As numbers grew, the British decided they did not want them kept locally. The capture of 4000 POWs in February 1900 was a key event, which made the British realise they could not accommodate all POWs in South Africa. The British feared they could be freed by sympathetic locals. Moreover, they already had trouble supplying their troops and did not want the added burden of sending supplies for the POWs. Britain therefore sent many POWs overseas.

Around 31 prisoner of war camps were consequently set up in British colonies overseas during the war. The first overseas (off African mainland) camps were opened in Saint Helena, which ultimately received about 5,000 POWs. About 5,000 POWs were sent to Ceylon. Other POWs were sent to Bermuda and India.

=== Oath of neutrality ===
On 15 March 1900, Lord Roberts proclaimed an amnesty for all burghers, except leaders, who took an oath of neutrality and returned quietly to their homes. It is estimated that between 12,000 and 14,000 burghers took this oath between March and June 1900.

== Third phase: Guerrilla war, September 1900–May 1902 ==
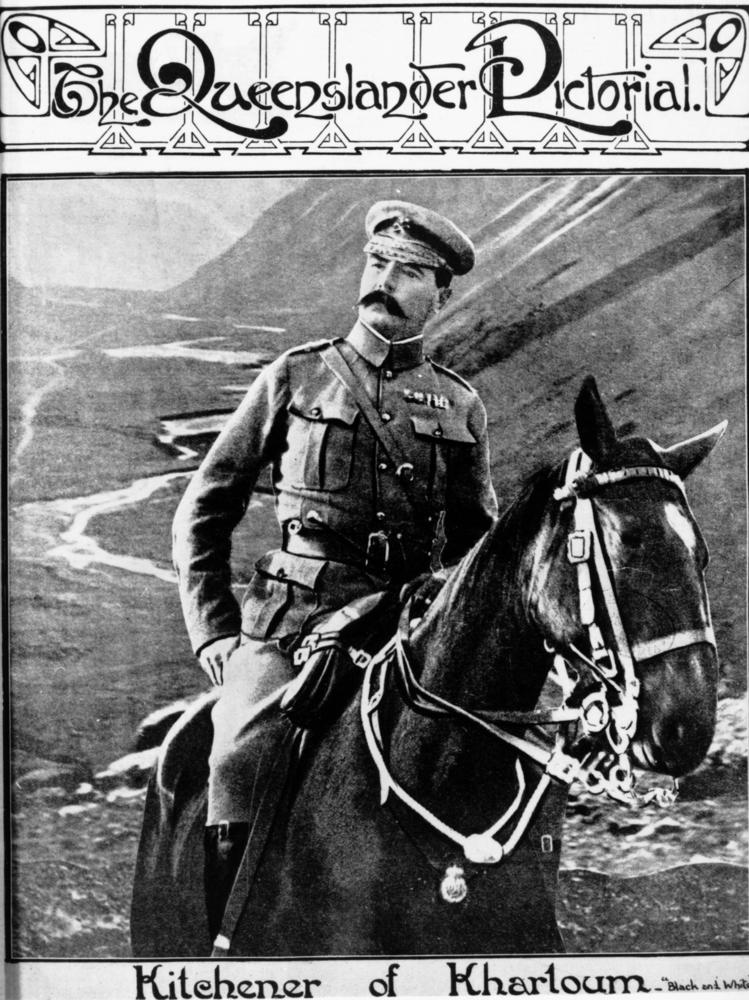
Kitchener succeeded Roberts in November 1900 and launched anti-guerrilla campaigns. 1898 photograph in 1910 magazine.

By September 1900, the British were nominally in control of both Republics, with the exception of north Transvaal. However, they discovered they only controlled the territory their columns physically occupied. Despite the loss of their capitals and half their army, the Boer commanders adopted guerrilla warfare, conducting raids against railways, resource and supply targets, aimed at disrupting the operational capacity of the British Army. They avoided pitched battles and casualties were light.

Boer commando units were sent to the district from which its members were recruited, which meant they could rely on local support and knowledge of the terrain and towns, enabling them to live off the land. Their orders were simply to act against the British whenever possible. Their tactics were to strike fast causing as much damage as possible, then withdraw before enemy reinforcements could arrive. The vast distances of the republics allowed Boer commandos freedom to move about and made it nearly impossible for the 250,000 British troops to control the territory effectively using columns alone. As soon as a British column left a town or district, British control of that area faded away. Boer commandos were especially effective during the initial guerrilla phase because Roberts had assumed the war would end with the capture of the capitals and dispersal of the Boer armies. British troops were therefore redeployed out of the area, and had been replaced by lower-quality Imperial Yeomanry and locally-raised irregular corps.

Playbill for an "illustrated lecture" on the campaign by war correspondent and artist René Bull,1900

From late May 1900, the first successes of the Boer guerrilla strategy were at Lindley (where 500 Yeomanry surrendered), and at Heilbron (where a large convoy and its escort were captured) and other skirmishes resulting in 1,500 British casualties in less than ten days. In December 1900, De la Rey and Christiaan Beyers attacked and mauled a British brigade at Nooitgedacht, inflicting 650 casualties. As a result, the British, led by Lord Kitchener, mounted extensive searches for Christiaan de Wet, but without success. However, Boer raids on British army camps and other targets were sporadic and poorly planned, and the nature of the Boer guerrilla war itself had no long-term objectives, with the exception to harass the British. This led to a disorganised pattern of scattered engagements between the British and Boers.

=== Use of blockhouses ===
The British were forced to revise their tactics. They concentrated on restricting the freedom of movement of the Boer commandos and depriving them of local support. The railway lines had provided vital lines of communication and supply, and as the British had advanced across South Africa, they had used armoured trains and established fortified blockhouses at key points along most lines. They built additional blockhouses (each housing between six to eight soldiers under a non-commissioned officer) at bridges and beside major roads connecting rural towns, and fortified these to protect supply routes against Boer raiders. Eventually over 8,000 such blockhouses were built across the republics, radiating from the larger towns along principal roads and railways. Each blockhouse cost £800-£1,000 and took three months to build. Despite this, they proved effective; not one bridge or any section of railway line at which an occupied blockhouse was blown up.

The blockhouse system required many troops to garrison. Well over 50,000 British troops, or 50 battalions, were involved in blockhouse duty, greater than the approximately 30,000 Boers in the field during the guerrilla phase. In addition, up to 16,000 local Africans were used as armed guards and to patrol the line at night. The Army linked the blockhouses with barbed wire fences to parcel up the wide veld into smaller areas. "New Model" drives were mounted under which a line of troops could sweep an area of veld bounded by blockhouse lines, unlike the earlier inefficient scouring of the countryside by scattered columns.

=== Scorched earth campaign against civilians ===
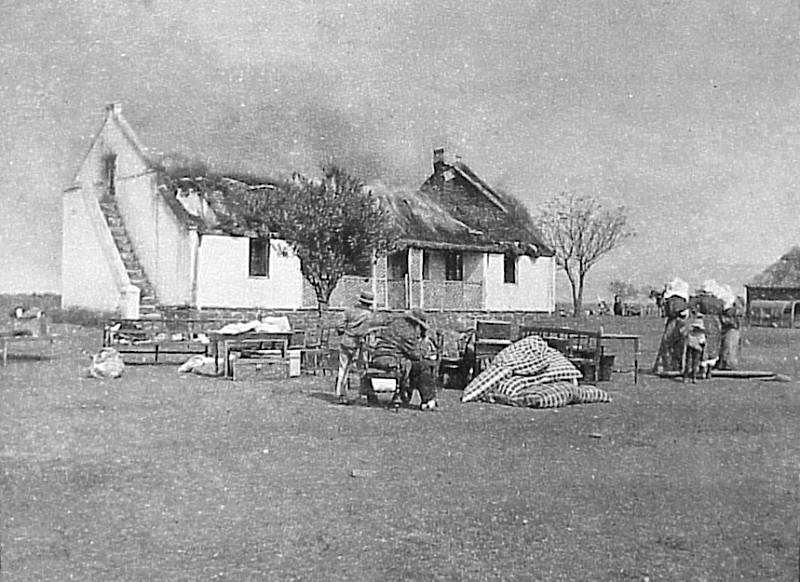
A British response to the guerrilla war was a scorched earth policy to deny guerrillas supplies and refuge. Here Boer civilians watch their house as it is burned.

The British implemented a scorched earth policy under which they targeted everything within the controlled areas that could give sustenance to the guerrillas, making it harder for them to survive. As British troops swept the countryside, they systematically destroyed crops, poisoned wells, burned homesteads and farms, and interned Boer and African men, women, children and workers in concentration camps. The British established mounted raiding columns in support of sweeper columns. These were used to rapidly follow and relentlessly harass the Boers to delay them and cut off escape, while the sweeper units caught up. Many of the 90 or so mobile columns formed by the British to participate in such drives were a mixture of British and colonial troops, but they also had a large minority of armed Africans. The number of armed Africans serving with these columns has been estimated at 20,000. The British Army made use of Boer auxiliaries who had been persuaded to change sides and enlist as "National Scouts". Serving under General Andries Cronjé (1849–1923), the National Scouts were despised as joiners but numbered a fifth of the fighting Afrikaners by the end of the War.

The British utilised armoured trains to deliver rapid reaction forces much more quickly to incidents (such as Boer attacks on blockhouses and columns) or drop them off ahead of retreating Boer columns.

=== Peace committees ===
Among those Burghers who had stopped fighting, it was decided to form peace committees to persuade those fighting to desist. In December 1900, Lord Kitchener gave permission that a central Burgher Peace Committee be inaugurated in Pretoria. By the end of 1900 thirty envoys were sent out to the districts to form peace committees to persuade burghers to give up. Previous leaders of the Boers, like Generals Piet de Wet and Andries Cronjé were involved in the organisation. Meyer de Kock was an emissary of a peace committee, but he was arrested, convicted of high treason, and executed by firing squad.

=== Joiners ===
Some burghers joined the British in their fight against the Boers. By the end of hostilities in May 1902, there were 5,464 burghers working for the British.

=== Orange Free State ===
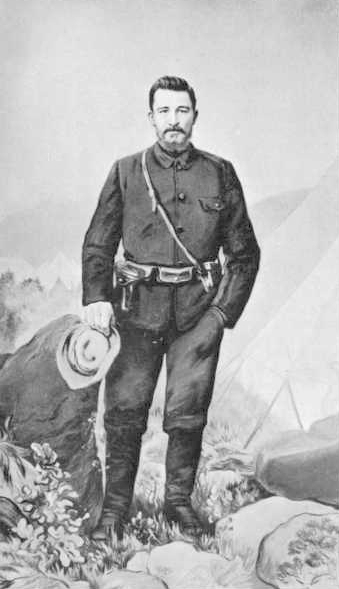
Christiaan De Wet was the most formidable leader of the Boer guerrillas. He successfully evaded capture several times and later involved in the negotiations for a peace settlement.

After having conferred with the Transvaal leaders, de Wet returned to the Orange Free State, where he inspired successful attacks and raids in the western part of the country, though he suffered a defeat at Bothaville in November 1900. Many Boers who had returned to their farms and towns, sometimes after being given parole by the British, took up arms again. In late January 1901, De Wet led a renewed invasion of Cape Colony. This was less successful, because there was no general uprising among the Cape Boers, and De Wet's men were hampered by bad weather and pursued by British forces. They narrowly escaped across the Orange River.

From then until the final days of the war, De Wet remained comparatively quiet, rarely attacking British army camps and columns partly because the Orange Free State was effectively left desolate by British sweeps. In December 1901, De Wet attacked and overran an isolated British detachment at Groenkop, inflicting heavy casualties and capturing over 200 British soldiers. This prompted Kitchener to launch the first of the "New Model" drives against him. De Wet escaped the first such drive but lost 300 of his fighters. This was a severe loss, and a portent of further attrition, although sweep attempts to round up De Wet were badly handled, and De Wet's forces avoided capture for the rest of the war.

=== Western Transvaal ===
The Boer commandos in the Western Transvaal were very active after September 1901. Several battles were fought there between September 1901 and March 1902. At Moedwil on 30 September 1901 and again at Driefontein on 24 October, General Koos De La Rey's forces attacked British camps and outposts but were forced to withdraw after the British offered strong resistance.

From late 1901 to early 1902, a time of relative quiet descended on the western Transvaal. February 1902 saw the next major battle in that region. On 25 February, De La Rey attacked a British column under Lieutenant-Colonel S. B. von Donop at Ysterspruit near Wolmaransstad. De La Rey succeeded in capturing many men and ammunition. The Boer attacks prompted Lord Methuen, the British second-in-command after Kitchener, to move his column from Vryburg to Klerksdorp to deal with De La Rey. On the morning of 7 March 1902, the Boers attacked the rear guard of Methuen's moving column at Tweebosch. Confusion reigned in British ranks and Methuen was wounded and captured by the Boers.

The Boer victories in the west led to stronger action by the British. In the second half of March 1902, British reinforcements were sent to the Western Transvaal under the direction of Ian Hamilton. The opportunity the British were waiting for arose on 11 April 1902 at Rooiwal, where a commando led by General Jan Kemp and Commandant Potgieter attacked a superior force under Kekewich. The British soldiers were well positioned on the hillside and inflicted casualties on the Boers charging on horseback over a large distance, beating them back. This was the end of the war in the Western Transvaal and the last major battle of the war.

=== Eastern Transvaal ===
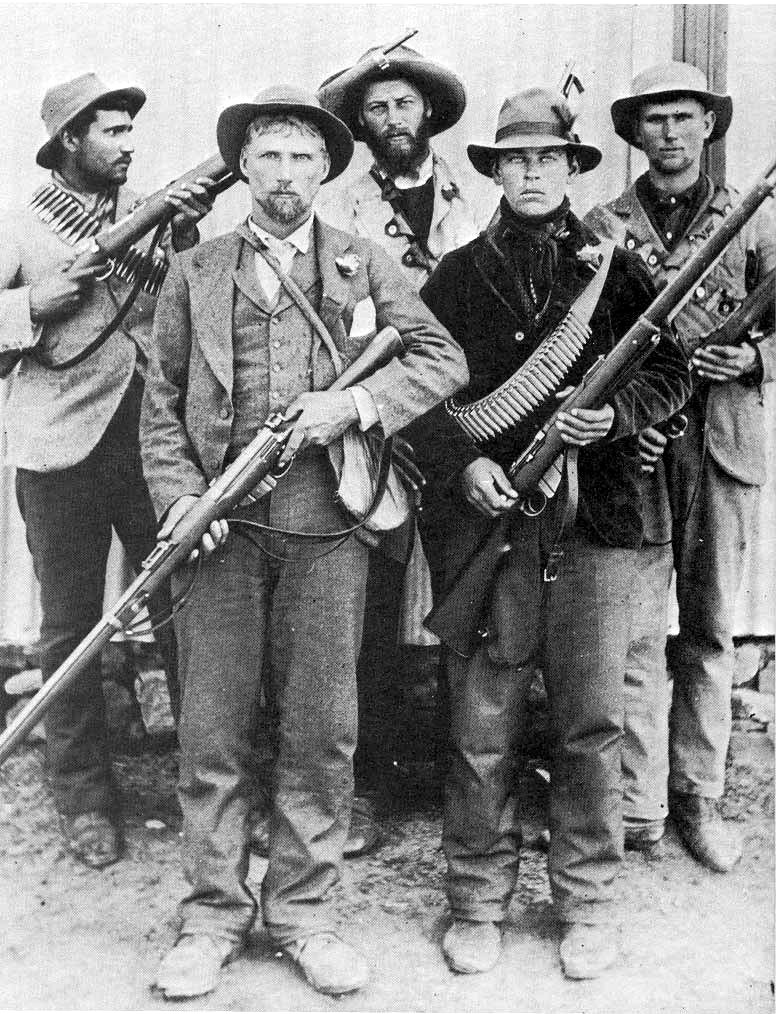
Boer commandos c. 1900

Two Boer forces fought in this area, under Botha in the south east and under Ben Viljoen in the north east around Lydenburg. Botha's forces were particularly active, raiding railways and British supply convoys, and mounting a renewed invasion of Natal in September 1901. After defeating British mounted infantry in the Battle of Blood River Poort near Dundee, Botha was forced to withdraw by heavy rain that made movement difficult and crippled his horses. Back on the Transvaal territory around his home district of Vryheid, Botha attacked a British raiding column at Bakenlaagte, using an effective mounted charge. One of the most active British units was effectively destroyed. This made Botha's forces the target of increasingly large scorched earth drives by British forces, in which the British made particular use of native scouts and informers. Eventually, Botha had to abandon the high veld and retreat to a narrow enclave bordering Swaziland.

To the north, Ben Viljoen grew steadily less active. His forces mounted comparatively few attacks and as a result, the Boer enclave around Lydenburg was largely unmolested. Viljoen was eventually captured.

=== Cape Colony ===
In parts of Cape Colony, particularly the Cape Midlands District where Boers formed a majority of the white inhabitants, the British had always feared a general uprising against them. In fact, no such uprising took place, even in the early days of the war when Boer armies had advanced across the Orange. The cautious conduct of some elderly Orange Free State generals had been one factor that discouraged the Cape Boers from siding with the Boer republics. Nevertheless, there was widespread pro-Boer sympathy. Some Cape Dutch volunteered to help the British, but a larger number volunteered to help the other side. Politics was more important than the military factor: the Cape Dutch, according to Milner 90 percent of whom favoured the rebels, controlled the provincial legislature, and its authorities forbade the British Army to burn farms or to force Boer civilians into concentration camps. The British had more limited options to suppress the insurgency in the Cape Colony as result.

After he escaped across the Orange in March 1901, de Wet had left forces under Cape rebels Kritzinger and Gideon Scheepers to maintain a guerrilla campaign in the Cape Midlands. The campaign here was one of the least chivalrous of the war, with intimidation by both sides of each other's civilian sympathisers. In one of many skirmishes, Commandant Johannes Lötter's small commando was tracked down by a much-superior British column and wiped out at Groenkloof. Several captured Boers, including Lotter and Scheepers, who was captured when he fell ill with appendicitis, were executed by the British for treason or for capital crimes such as the murder of British prisoners or unarmed civilians. Some of the executions took place in public, to deter further disaffection.

Fresh Boer forces under Jan Christiaan Smuts, joined by the surviving rebels under Kritzinger, made another attack on the Cape in September 1901. They suffered severe hardships and were hard pressed by British columns, but eventually rescued themselves by routing some of their pursuers at the Battle of Elands River and capturing their equipment. From then until the end of the war, Smuts increased his forces from among Cape rebels until they numbered 3,000. However, no general uprising took place, and the situation in the Cape remained stalemated.

In January 1902, Boer leader Manie Maritz was implicated in the Leliefontein massacre in the far Northern Cape.

== Boer foreign volunteers ==
While no other government actively supported the Boer cause, individuals from several countries volunteered and formed Foreign Volunteer Units. These primarily came from Europe, particularly the Netherlands, Germany and Sweden-Norway. Other countries such as France, Italy, Ireland (then part of the United Kingdom), and restive areas of the Russian Empire, including Congress Poland and Georgia, also formed smaller volunteer corps. Finns fought in the Scandinavian Corps. Two volunteers, George Henri Anne-Marie Victor de Villebois-Mareuil of France and Yevgeny Maximov of Russia, became veggeneraals (fighting generals) of the South African Republic.

== Conclusion ==
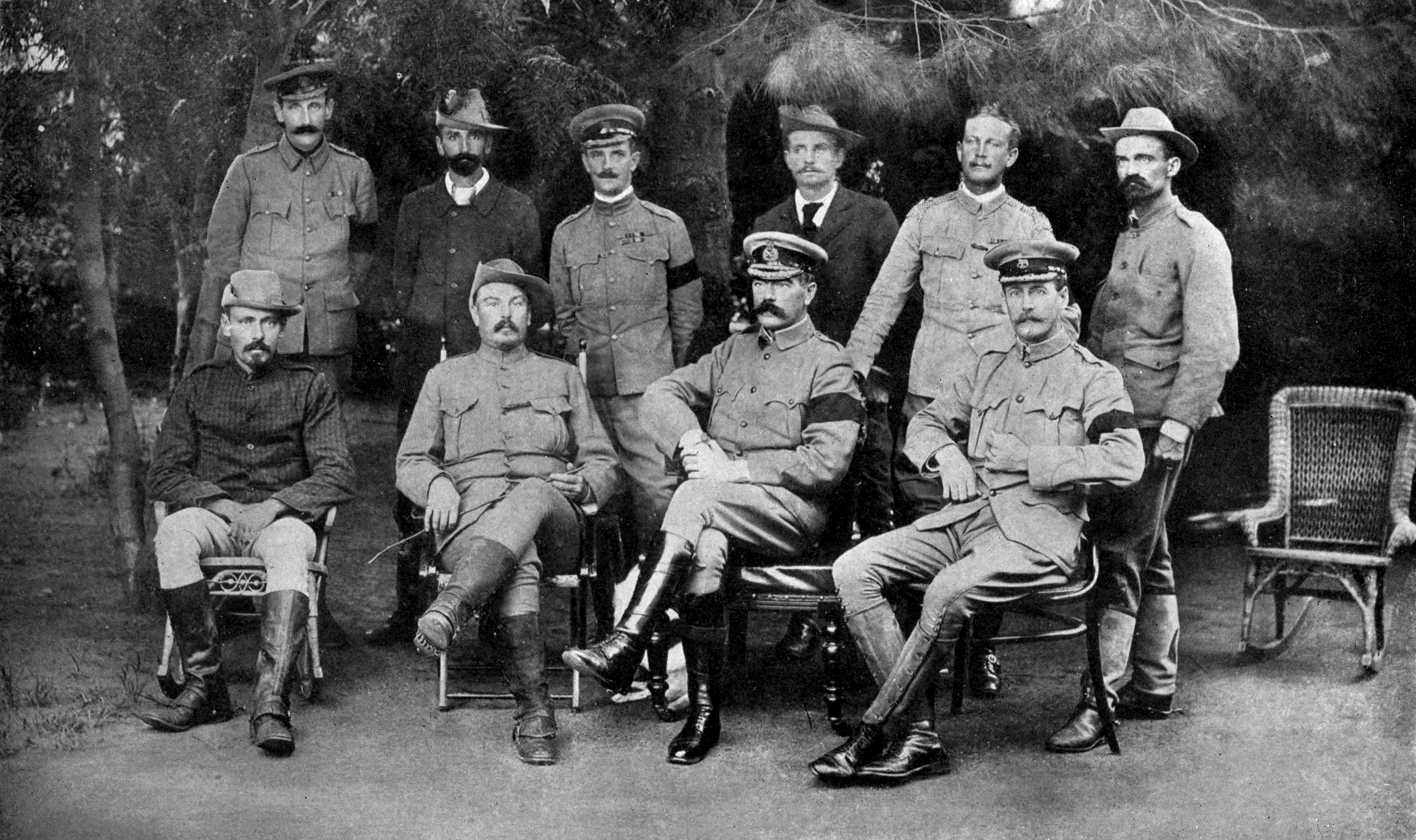
Peace conference at Vereeniging

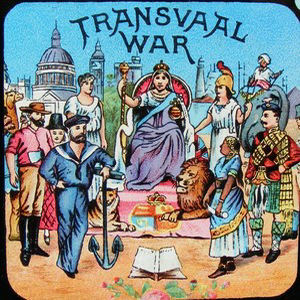
"Transvaal War". Queen Victoria on her throne among Commonwealth subjects in front of London. First British magic lantern slide in an educational series for children, 1900s.

In early 1902, British tactics of containment, denial, and harassment finally began to yield results against the Boer guerrillas. The sourcing and co-ordination of intelligence became increasingly efficient with regular reporting from observers in the blockhouses, from units patrolling the fences and conducting "sweeper" operations, and from native Africans in rural areas who increasingly supplied intelligence, as the Scorched Earth policy took effect and they found themselves competing with the Boers for food supplies. Kitchener's forces at last began to affect the Boers' fighting strength and freedom of manoeuvre, and made it harder for the Boers and their families to survive. Despite this success, almost half the Boer fighting strength, around 15,000 men, were still in the field fighting by May 1902. However, Kitchener's tactics were costly: Britain was running out of time, patience, and money needed for the war.

The British offered terms of peace on various occasions, notably in March 1901, but all them were rejected by Botha and the "Bitter-enders" among the Boers, who pledged to fight until the bitter end and rejected the demand for surrender or any compromise made by the "Hands-uppers". Their reasons included their hatred of the British, loyalty to their dead comrades, solidarity with fellow Boer commandos, a desire for independence, religious arguments, and fear of captivity or punishment. On the other hand, their women and children were dying in prison camps every day, and independence seemed more and more impossible.

The last of the Boers finally surrendered in late May 1902 and the war ended with the Treaty of Vereeniging signed on 31 May 1902. After a period of obstinacy, the British offered the Boers generous terms of conditional surrender in order to bring the war to a conclusion. The Boers were given £3,000,000 (equivalent to £319,000,000 in 2025) for reconstruction and promised eventual limited self-government, which was granted in 1906 and 1907. The treaty ended the existence of the Transvaal and Orange Free State as independent Boer republics and placed them within the British Empire. The Union of South Africa was established as a dominion of the British Empire in 1910.

== Nonwhite roles ==
The policy on both sides was to minimise the role of nonwhites, but the need for manpower continuously stretched those resolves. At the battle of Spion Kop in Ladysmith, Mahatma Gandhi with 300 free burgher Indians and 800 indentured Indian labourers started the Ambulance Corps serving the British side. As the war raged across Indigenous African farms and their homes were destroyed, many became refugees and they, like the Boers, moved to the towns where the British hastily created internment camps. Subsequently, the British scorched earth policies were applied to both Boers and Indigenous Africans. Although most native Africans were not considered by the British to be hostile, many tens of thousands were also forcibly removed from Boer areas and also placed in concentration camps. Indigenous Africans were held separately from Boer internees. Eventually there were a total of 64 tented camps for Indigenous Africans. Conditions were as bad as in the camps for the Boers, but even though, after the Fawcett Commission report, conditions improved in the Boer camps, "improvements were much slower in coming to the black camps"; 20,000 died there.

The Boers and the British both feared the consequences of arming Indigenous Africans. The memories of the Zulu and other tribal conflicts were still fresh, and they recognised that whoever won would have to deal with the consequences of a mass militarisation of the tribes. There was therefore an unwritten agreement that this war would be a "white man's war." At the outset, British officials instructed all white magistrates in the Natal Colony to appeal to Zulu amakhosi (chiefs) to remain neutral, and President Kruger sent emissaries asking them to stay out of it. However, in some cases there were old scores to be settled, and some Indigenous Africans, such as the Swazis, were eager to enter the war with the specific aim of reclaiming land won by the Boers. As the war went on there was greater involvement of Indigenous Africans, and in particular large numbers became embroiled in the conflict on the British side, either voluntarily or involuntarily. By the end of the war, many Indigenous Africans had been armed and had shown conspicuous gallantry in roles such as scouts, messengers, watchmen in blockhouses, and auxiliaries.

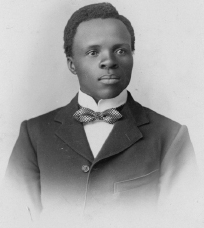
Sol Plaatje who kept a diary during the siege of Mafeking.

And there were more flash points outside of the war. On 6 May 1902 at Holkrantz in the southeastern Transvaal, a Zulu faction had their cattle stolen and their women and children tortured by the Boers as a punishment for assisting the British. The local Boer officer then sent an insulting message to the tribe, challenging them to take back their cattle. The Zulus attacked at night, and in a mutual bloodbath, the Boers lost 56 killed and 3 wounded, while the Indigenous Africans suffered 52 killed and 48 wounded.

About 10,000 black men were attached to Boer units where they performed camp duties; a handful unofficially fought in combat. The British Army employed over 14,000 Indigenous Africans as wagon drivers. Even more had combatant roles as spies, guides, and eventually as soldiers. By 1902 there were about 30,000 armed Indigenous Africans in the British Army. Sol Plaatje was the only black person to keep a diary during the war, which later proved to be a valuable source about the black participation in the war.

== Concentration camps ==
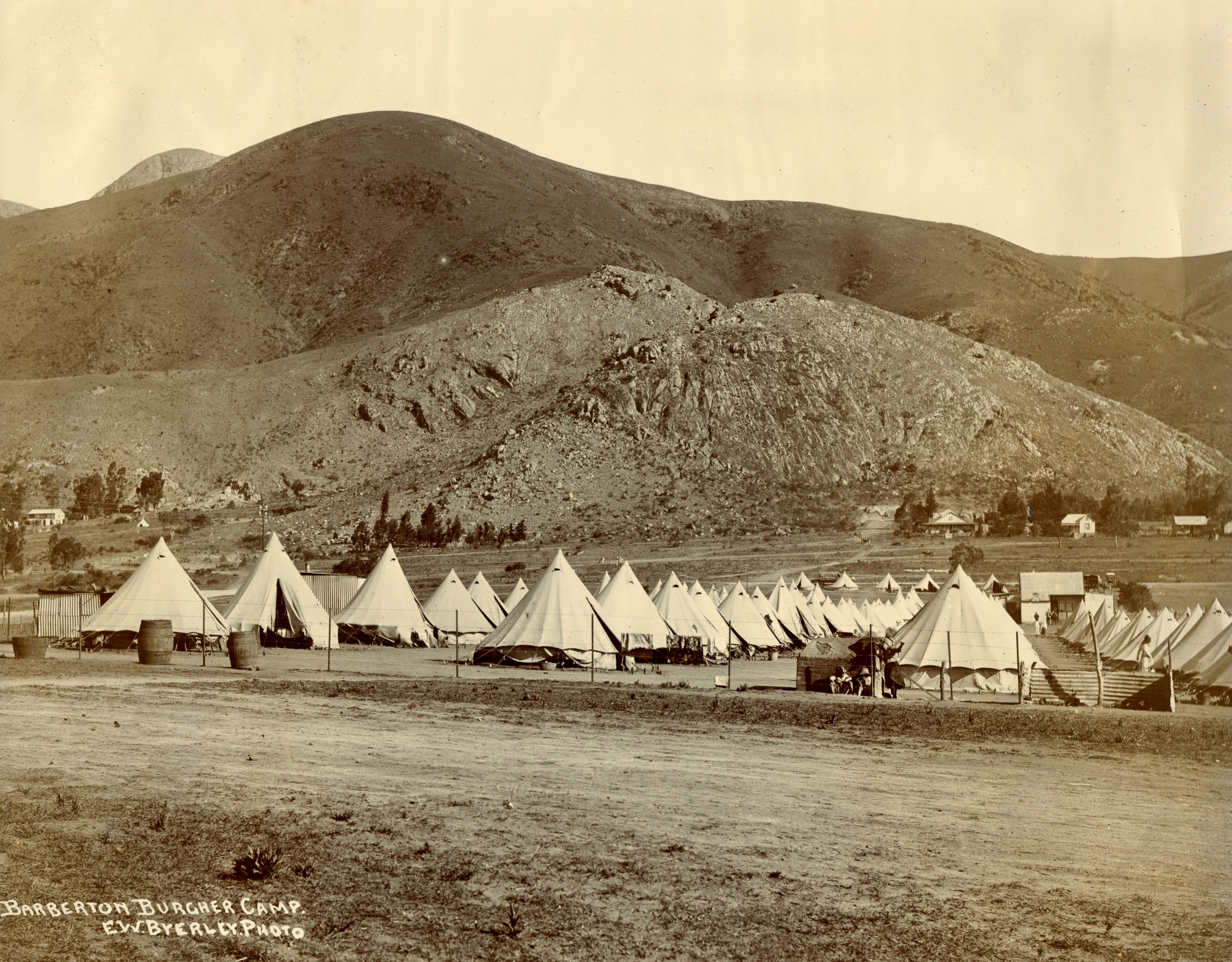
Tents in the Barberton concentration camp, c.1901

The term "concentration camp" was used to describe camps operated by the British in South Africa during this conflict in the years 1900–02, and the term grew in prominence during this period.

The camps had originally been set up by the British Army as "refugee camps" to provide refuge for civilian families who had been forced to abandon their homes for whatever reason related to the war. However, when Kitchener took over in late 1900, he introduced new tactics in an attempt to break the guerrilla campaign and the influx of civilians grew dramatically as a result. Disease and starvation killed thousands. Kitchener initiated plans to

... flush out guerrillas in a series of systematic drives, organised like a sporting shoot, with success defined in a weekly 'bag' of killed, captured and wounded, and to sweep the country bare of everything that could give sustenance to the guerrillas, including women and children ... It was the clearance of civilians—uprooting a whole nation—that would come to dominate the last phase of the war. — Pakenham, The Boer War

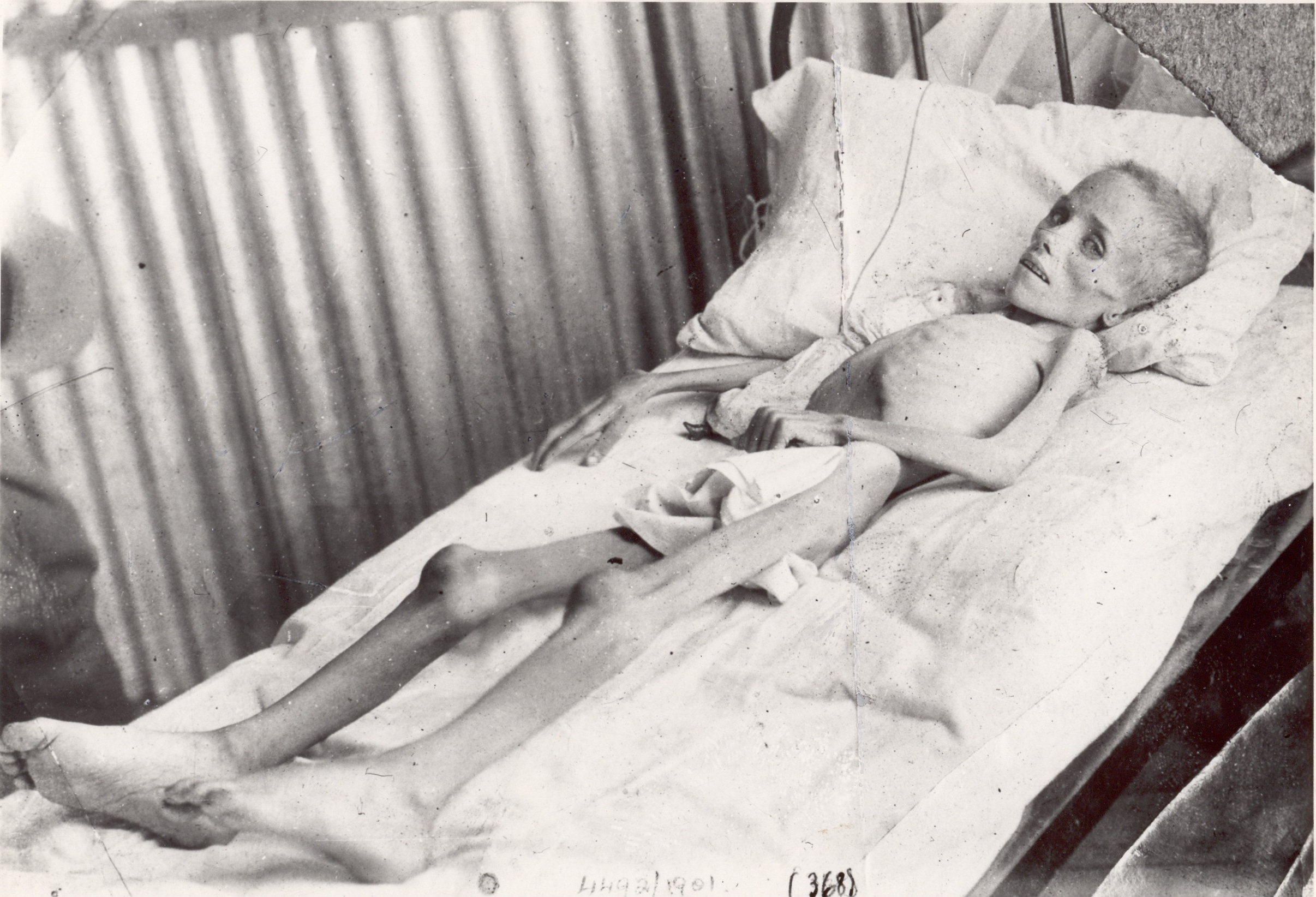
Lizzie van Zyl, a Boer child (age 7), photographed by Emily Hobhouse in a British concentration camp near Bloemfontein, February 1901

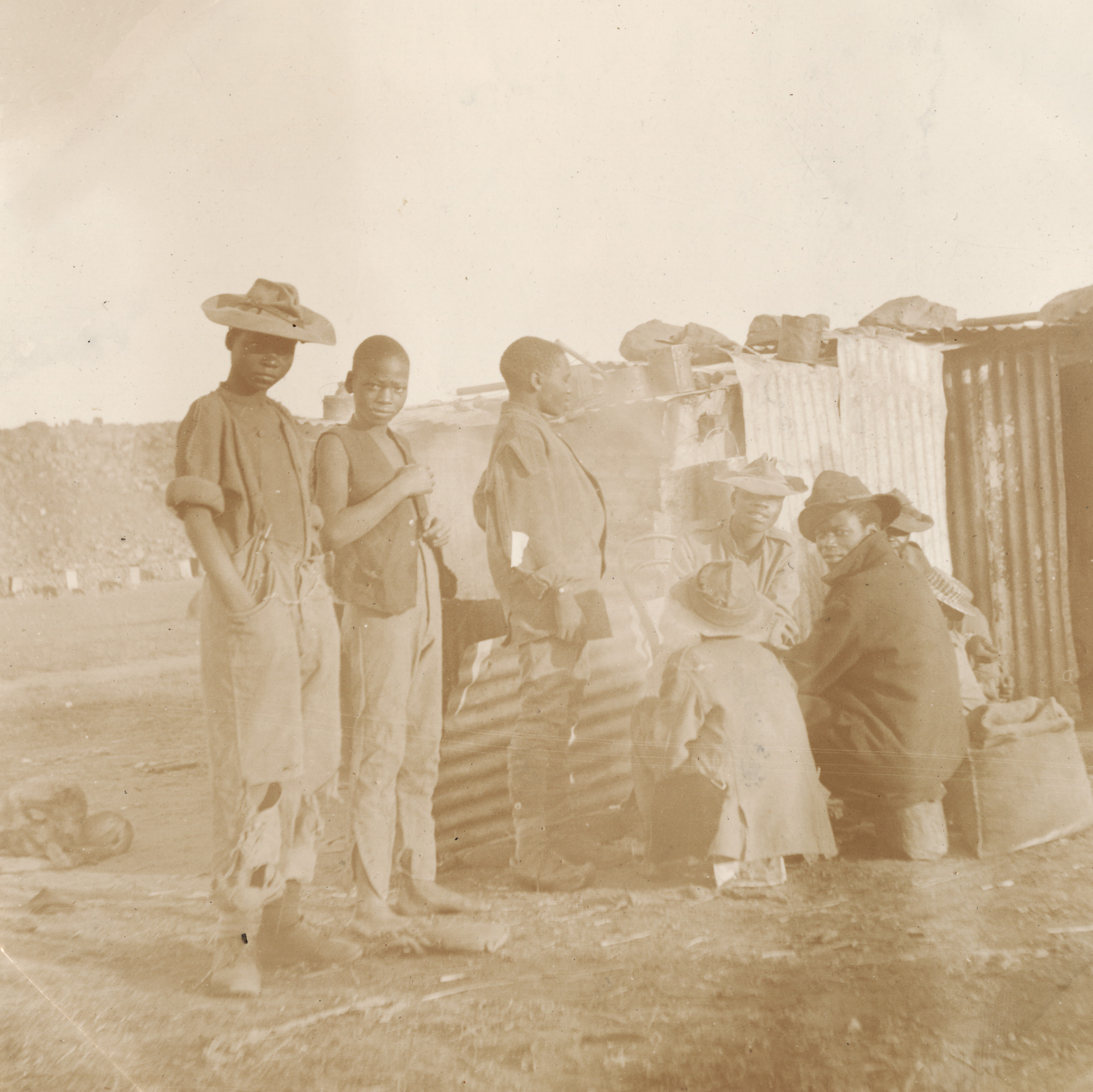
Native Africans interned in the Bronkerspruit camp

As Boer farms were destroyed by the British under their "Scorched Earth" policy—including the systematic destruction of crops and slaughtering of livestock, the burning down of homesteads and farms—to prevent the Boers from resupplying from a home base, many tens of thousands of women and children were forcibly moved into the concentration camps. This was not the first appearance of internment camps, as the Spanish had used internment in Cuba in the Ten Years' War, and the Americans in the Philippine–American War, but the Boer War concentration camp system was the first time that a whole nation had been systematically targeted, and the first in which whole regions had been depopulated.

Eventually, there were a total of 45 tented camps built for Boer internees and 64 for black Africans. Of the 28,000 Boer men captured as prisoners of war, 25,630 were sent overseas to prisoner-of-war camps throughout the British Empire. The vast majority of Boers remaining in the local camps were women and children. Around 26,370 Boer women and children were to perish in these concentration camps. Of the more than 120,000 Blacks (and Coloureds) imprisoned too, around 20,000 died.

The camps were poorly administered from the outset and became increasingly overcrowded when Kitchener's troops implemented the internment strategy on a vast scale. Conditions were terrible for the health of the internees, mainly due to neglect, poor hygiene and bad sanitation. The supply of all items was unreliable, partly because of the constant disruption of communication lines by the Boers. The food rations were meagre and there was a two-tier allocation policy, whereby families of men who were still fighting were routinely given smaller rations than others. The inadequate shelter, poor diet, bad hygiene and overcrowding led to malnutrition and endemic contagious diseases such as measles, typhoid, and dysentery, to which the children were particularly vulnerable. Coupled with a shortage of modern medical facilities, many of the internees died. While much of the British press, including The Times, played down the problems in the camps, Emily Hobhouse helped raise public awareness in Britain of the atrocious conditions, as well as being instrumental in bringing relief to the concentration camps.

== War crimes trial ==
The Boer War saw the first war crimes prosecutions in British history. They centered around the Bushveldt Carbineers (BVC), a British Army irregular regiment of mounted rifles active in the Northern Transvaal. Originally raised in February 1901, the BVC was composed of British and Commonwealth servicemen with an admixture of defectors from the Boer Commandos. On 4 October 1901, a letter signed by 15 members of the Bushveldt Carbineers (BVC) garrison at Fort Edward was secretly dispatched to Col. F.H. Hall, the British Army Officer Commanding at Pietersburg. Written by BVC Trooper Robert Mitchell Cochrane, a former justice of the peace from Western Australia, the letter accused members of the Fort Edward garrison of six "disgraceful incidents":

1. The shooting of six surrendered Afrikaner men and boys and theft of their money and livestock at Valdezia on 2 July 1901. The orders were given by Captains Alfred Taylor and James Huntley Robertson, and relayed by Sgt. Maj. K.C.B. Morrison to Sgt. D.C. Oldham. The actual killing was alleged to have been carried out by Sgt. Oldham and BVC Troopers Eden, Arnold, Brown, Heath, and Dale.
2. The shooting of BVC Trooper B.J. van Buuren by BVC Lt. Peter Handcock on 4 July. Trooper van Buuren, an Afrikaner, had "disapproved" of the killings at Valdezia, and informed the victims' wives and children, imprisoned at Fort Edward, of what had happened.
3. The revenge killing of Floris Visser, a wounded prisoner of war, near the Koedoes River on 11 August. Visser had been captured by a BVC patrol led by Lieut. Harry Morant two days before his death. After Visser had been exhaustively interrogated and conveyed for 15 miles by the patrol, Lt. Morant had ordered his men to form a firing squad and shoot him. The squad consisted of BVC Troopers A.J. Petrie, J.J. Gill, Wild, and T.J. Botha. A coup de grâce was delivered by BVC Lt. Harry Picton. The slaying of Visser was in retaliation for the combat death of Morant's friend, BVC Captain Percy Frederik Hunt, at Duivelskloof on 6 August.
4. The shooting, ordered by Capt. Taylor and Lt. Morant, of four surrendered Afrikaners and four Dutch schoolteachers, who had been captured at the Elim Hospital in Valdezia, on the morning of 23 August. The firing squad consisted of BVC Lt. George Witton, Sgt. D.C. Oldham, and Troopers J.T. Arnold, Edward Brown, T. Dale, and A. Heath. Although Trooper Cochrane's letter made no mention of the fact, three Native South African witnesses were also shot dead. The ambush and fatal shooting of the Reverend Carl August Daniel Heese of the Berlin Missionary Society near Bandolierkop on the afternoon of 23 August. Rev. Heese had spiritually counseled the Dutch and Afrikaner victims that morning and angrily protested to Morant at Fort Edward upon learning of their deaths. Trooper Cochrane alleged that the killer of Heese was BVC Lt. Handcock. Although Cochrane made no mention that Heese's driver, a member of the Southern Ndebele people, was also killed.
5. The orders, given by BVC Lt. Charles H.G. Hannam, to open fire on a wagon train containing Afrikaner women and children who were coming in to surrender at Fort Edward, on 5 September. The ensuing gunfire led to the deaths of two boys, aged 5 and 13, and the wounding of a 9-year-old girl.
6. The shooting of Roelf van Staden and his sons Roelf and Christiaan, near Fort Edward on 7 September. All were coming to surrender in the hope of gaining medical treatment for Christiaan, who was suffering from fever. Instead, they were met at the Sweetwaters Farm near Fort Edward by a party consisting of Lts. Morant and Handcock, joined by BVC Sgt. Maj. Hammet, Corp. MacMahon, and Troopers Hodds, Botha, and Thompson. Roelf van Staden and both his sons were shot, allegedly after being forced to dig their graves.

The letter then accused Field Commander of the BVC, Major Robert William Lenehan, of being "privy to these misdeamenours. It is for this reason that we have taken the liberty of addressing this communication direct to you." After listing civilian witnesses who could confirm their allegations, Trooper Cochrane concluded, "Sir, many of us are Australians who have fought throughout nearly the whole war while others are Africaners who have fought from Colenso till now. We cannot return home with the stigma of these crimes attached to our names. Therefore we humbly pray that a full and exhaustive inquiry be made by Imperial officers in order that the truth be elicited and justice done. Also we beg that all witnesses may be kept in camp at Pietersburg till the inquiry is finished. So deeply do we deplore the opprobrium which must be inseparably attached to these crimes that scarcely a man once his time is up can be prevailed to re-enlist in this corps. Trusting for the credit of thinking you will grant the inquiry we seek." In response to the letter, Col. Hall summoned all Fort Edward officers to Pietersburg on 21 October. All were met by mounted infantry five miles outside Pietersburg on the morning of 23 October and "brought into town like criminals". Lt. Morant was arrested after returning from leave in Pretoria, where he had gone to settle the affairs of his deceased friend Captain Hunt.

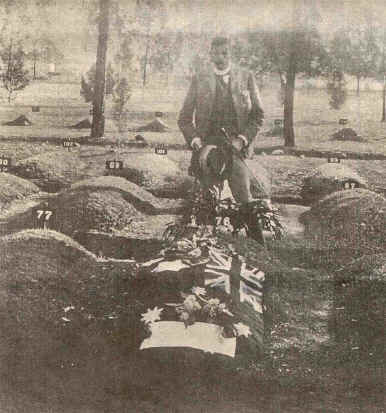
Major James Francis Thomas standing over the joint grave of Breaker Morant and Peter Handcock, officers executed after a 1902 court-martial.

Although the trial transcripts, like most others between 1850-1914, were later destroyed by the Civil Service, it is known that a Court of Inquiry, the British military's equivalent to a grand jury, was convened on 16 October. The President of the Court was Col. H.M. Carter, who was assisted by Captain E. Evans and Major Wilfred N. Bolton, the Provost Marshal of Pietersburg. Its first session took place on 6 November and continued for four weeks. Deliberations continued for a further two weeks, at which time it became clear the indictments would be as follows:

1. In what became known as "The Six Boers Case", Captains Robertson and Taylor, as well as Sgt. Maj. Morrison, were charged with committing the offense of murder while on active service.
2. In relation to what was dubbed "The Van Buuren Incident", Maj. Lenahan was charged with, "When on active service by culpable neglect failing to make a report which it was his duty to make."
3. In relation to "The Visser Incident", Lts. Morant, Handcock, Witton, and Picton were charged with "While on active service committing the offense of murder".
4. In relation to what was incorrectly dubbed "The Eight Boers Case", Lieuts. Morant, Handcock, and Witton were charged with, "While on active service committing the offense of murder". In relation to the slaying of Heese, Lts. Morant and Handcock were charged with, "While on active service committing the offense of murder".
5. No charges were filed for the three children who had been shot by the Bushveldt Carbineers near Fort Edward.
6. In relation to what became known as "The Three Boers Case", Lts. Morant and Handcock were charged with, "While on active service committing the offense of murder".

Following the indictments, Maj. R. Whigham and Col. James St. Clair ordered Bolton to appear for the prosecution, as he was less expensive than a barrister. Bolton vainly requested to be excused, writing, "My knowledge of law is insufficient for so intricate a matter." The first court martial opened on 16 January 1902, with Lieut.-Col. H.C. Denny presiding over a panel of six judges. Maj. J.F. Thomas, a solicitor from Tenterfield, New South Wales, had been retained to defend Maj. Lenahan. The night before, however, he agreed to represent all six defendants. The "Visser Incident" was the first case to go to trial. Lt. Morant's former orderly and interpreter, BVC Trooper Theunis J. Botha, testified that Visser, who had been promised his life would be spared, was cooperative during two days of interrogation and his information was found to have been true. Despite this, Morant ordered him shot. In response, Morant testified that he only followed orders to take no prisoners as relayed to the late Captain Hunt by Col. Hubert Hamilton. He alleged that Visser was captured wearing a British Army jacket and that Hunt's body had been mutilated. In response, the court moved to Pretoria, where Col. Hamilton testified that he had "never spoken to Captain Hunt with reference to his duties in the Northern Transvaal". Though stunned, Maj. Thomas argued that his clients were not guilty because they believed that they "acted under orders". In response, Bolton argued that they were "illegal orders" and said, "The right of killing an armed man exists only so long as he resists; as soon as he submits he is entitled to be treated as a prisoner of war." The Court ruled in Bolton's favor. Morant was found guilty of murder. Handcock, Witton, and Picton were convicted of the lesser charge of manslaughter.

On 27 February Morant and Handcock were executed by firing squad after being convicted of murdering eight Afrikaner POWs. This court-martial for war crimes was one of the first such prosecutions in British history. Although Morant left a confession in his cell, he went on to become a folk hero in modern Australia. Believed by many Australians to be the victim of a kangaroo court, appeals have been made for Morant to be retried or pardoned. His court-martial and death have been the subject of books, a stage play, and Australian New Wave film adaptation. Witton was sentenced to death, but reprieved. Due to immense political pressure, he was released after serving 32 months of a life sentence. Picton was cashiered.

== Imperial involvement ==
Most troops fighting for the British army came from Britain, and a significant number came from other parts of its Empire. These countries had internal disputes over whether they should remain tied to London, or have independence, which carried over into the debate around sending forces to assist the war. Though not independent on foreign affairs, these countries did have local say over how much support to provide, and how it was provided. Australia, Canada, New Zealand, and Rhodesia all sent volunteers to aid the UK. Troops were also raised to fight with the British from the Cape Colony and Natal. Some Boer fighters, such as Smuts and Botha, were British subjects as they came from the Cape Colony and Colony of Natal, respectively.

There were many volunteers from the Empire who were not selected for the official contingents and travelled privately to form private units, such as the Canadian Scouts and Doyle's Australian Scouts. There were European volunteer units from British India and British Ceylon, though the British refused offers of non-white troops from the Empire. Some Cape Coloureds volunteered early in the war, but later some were effectively conscripted and kept in segregated units. As a community, they received little reward for their services. The war set the pattern for the Empire's involvement in the two World Wars. Specially raised units, consisting of volunteers, were dispatched overseas to serve with forces from elsewhere in the Empire.

=== Australia ===
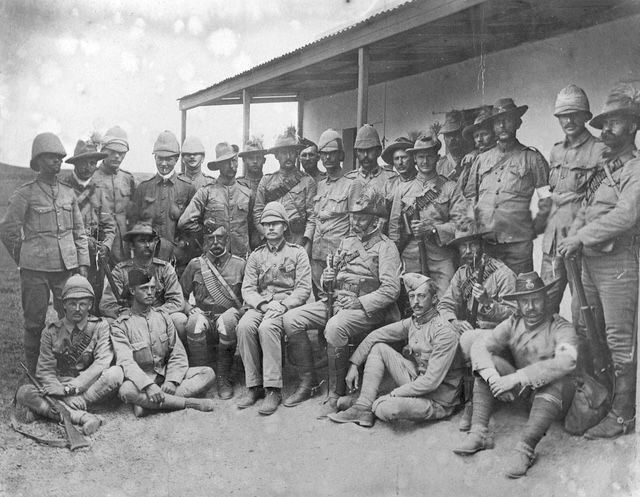
British and Australian officers in South Africa, c. 1900

From 1899 to 1901 the six separate self-governing colonies in Australia sent contingents to serve in the war. That much of the population had originated from Britain explains a desire to support it. After the colonies formed the Commonwealth of Australia in 1901, the new Government of Australia sent "Commonwealth" contingents to the war. The Boer War was thus the first war in which the Commonwealth of Australia fought. A few Australians fought on the Boer side. The most famous and colourful character was Colonel Arthur Alfred Lynch, formerly of Ballarat, Victoria, who raised the Second Irish Brigade.

The Australian climate and geography were far closer to that of South Africa than most other parts of the empire, so Australians adapted quickly, with troops serving mostly among the army's "mounted rifles". Enlistment in official Australian contingents totalled 16,463. Another five to seven thousand Australians served in "irregular" regiments raised in South Africa. Perhaps 500 Australian irregulars were killed. In total about 20,000 Australians served and about 1,000 were killed. 267 died from disease, 251 were killed in action or from wounds sustained in battle; 43 men were reported missing.

When the war began some Australians, like some Britons, opposed it. As the war dragged on some Australians became disenchanted, in part because of the sufferings of Boer civilians reported in the press. When the British missed capturing President Paul Kruger, as he escaped Pretoria during its fall in June 1900, a Melbourne Punch cartoon depicted how the War could be won, using the Kelly Gang.

The convictions and executions of two Australian lieutenants, Harry Harbord Morant and Peter Handcock in 1902, and the imprisonment of a third, George Witton, had minimal impact on the Australian public at the time. The controversial court-martial saw the three convicted of executing prisoners under their authority. After the war though, Australians joined an empire-wide campaign that saw Witton released from jail. Much later, some Australians came to see the execution of Morant and Handcock as instances of wrongfully executed Australians, as illustrated in the 1980 Australian film Breaker Morant.

Up to 50 Aboriginal Australians served in the Boer War as trackers. Such is the lack of information available it is even uncertain as to whether they returned to Australia after the war. When the Australian contingents returned the trackers may not have been allowed back to Australia due to the White Australia Policy.

=== Canada ===
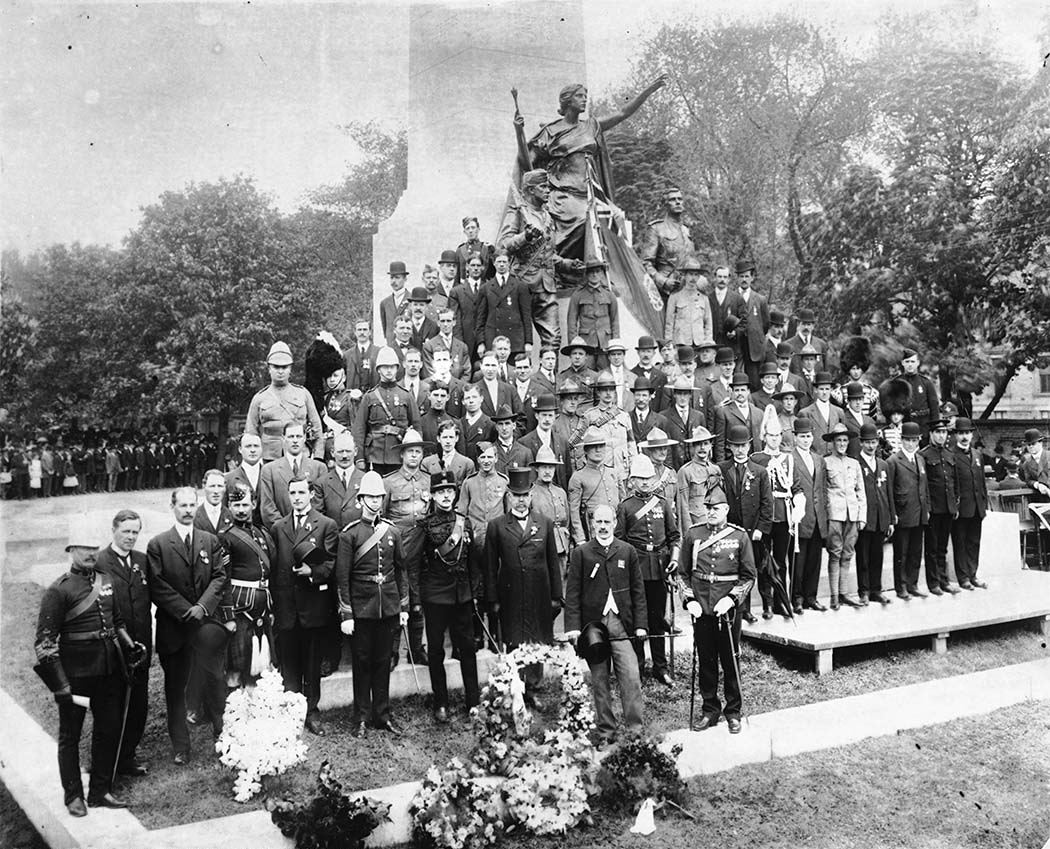
The unveiling of the South African War Memorial in Toronto, Ontario, Canada, in 1910

Around 8,000 Canadians arrived in South Africa to fight for Britain. These arrived in contingents: the first on 30 October 1899, the second on 21 January 1900. A third contingent of cavalry (Strathcona's Horse) embarked on 16/17 March 1900. They remained until May 1902. With approximately 7,368 soldiers in a combat zone, the conflict became the largest engagement involving Canadian soldiers from the time of Confederation until the Great War. 270 of them died during the war.

The arrival and movement of troops was widely documented by war photographers. English-born, and later Canadian, Inglis Sheldon-Williams was one of the most notable, documenting movement of hundreds of troops to Africa.

The Canadian public was initially divided on the decision to go to war, as some did not want Canada to become Britain's 'tool' for engaging in armed conflicts. Many Anglophone citizens were pro-Empire, and wanted prime minister Sir Wilfrid Laurier to support the British. Many Francophone citizens felt threatened by the continuation of British imperialism to their national sovereignty. In the end, to appease citizens who wanted war and avoid angering those against it, Laurier sent 1,000 volunteers under the command of Lieutenant Colonel William Otter to aid the confederation in its war to 'liberate' the peoples of the Boer controlled states in South Africa. The volunteers were provided to the British if the latter paid costs of the battalion after it arrived in South Africa.

The supporters of the war claimed that it "pitted British Freedom, justice and civilization against Boer backwardness". The French Canadians' opposition to the Canadian involvement in a British 'colonial venture' eventually led to a three-day riot in Quebec. Many Canadian soldiers did not actually see combat since many arrived around the time of the signing of the Treaty of Vereeniging on 31 May 1902.

Notable Canadian engagements
Battle	Description
Paardeberg	A British-led attack trapped a Boer Army in Central South Africa on the banks of the Modder River from 18 to 27 February 1900. Over 800 Canadian soldiers from Otter's 2nd Special Service Battalion were attached to the British attack force. This was the first major attack involving the Canadians in the Boer War, as well as the first major victory for Commonwealth soldiers.
Zand River	On 6 May 1900, the Commonwealth's northwards advance to the capital of Pretoria was well on its way. However, the British soldiers encountered a position of Boer soldiers on the Zand River on 10 May. The British commander felt that the best course of action was to use cavalry to envelop the Boers on their left flank and infantry would therefore march on the Boer right flank to secure a crossing. The Canadian 2nd Battalion was the lead unit advancing on the right flank. However, due to disease and casualties from earlier encounters, the 2nd battalion was reduced to approximately half of its initial strength. The Canadian battalion came under fire from the Boers who were occupying protected positions. The battle continued for several hours until the British cavalry was able to flank the Boers and force a retreat. Canadian casualties were two killed and two wounded. The skirmishes around the Zand River would continue and more soldiers from various Commonwealth countries would become involved.
Doornkop	On the days of 28–30 May 1900, both the Canadian 2nd battalion and the 1st Mounted Infantry Brigade fought together on the same battlefield for the first, and only, time. The Mounted Brigade, which encompassed units such as the Canadian Mounted Rifles and the Royal Canadian Dragoons were given the task to establish a beachhead across a river which the Boers had fortified in an attempt to halt the advancing Commonwealth before they could reach the city of Johannesburg. Since the Boers were mounting a heavy resistance to the advancing mounted units, the Commonwealth infantry units were tasked with holding the Boer units while the mounted units found another route across the river with less resistance. Even after the cavalry made it across to the other side of the river further down the line, the infantry had to advance onto the town of Doornkop as they were the ones who were tasked with its capture. The Canadians suffered very minimal casualties and achieved their objective after the Boer soldiers retreated from their positions. Although the Canadians suffered minimal casualties, the lead British unit in the infantry advance, the Gordon Highlanders, did sustain heavy casualties in their march from the riflemen of the Boer force.
Witpoort	On 16 July 1900, British, Canadian, New Zealander, Queenslander forces under the command of Lieutenant General Sir Edward Hutton held off a three pronged Boer attack from daybreak until 2:00 pm. Canadian forces mounted a counter-attack in order to recapture positions which had been lost by the New Zealand Mounted Rifles. Despite heavy losses, including the death of Lieutenant Harold Lothrop Borden (the only son of then Minister for Militia and Defence Sir Frederick William Borden) the Canadians successfully recaptured all positions.
Leliefontein	On 7 November 1900, a British-Canadian force was searching for a unit of Boer commandos which were known to be operating around the town of Belfast, South Africa. After the British Commander reached the farm of Leliefontein, he began to fear that his line had expanded too far and ordered a withdrawal of the front line troops. The rear guard, consisting of the Royal Canadian Dragoons and two 12 pound guns from D section of the Canadian artillery, were tasked with covering the retreat. The Boers mounted a heavy assault against the Canadians with the intention of capturing the two 12 pound artillery pieces. During this battle, the Afrikaners outnumbered the Canadians almost three to one. A small group of the Dragoons interposed themselves between the Boers and the artillery in order to allow the guns and their crews time to escape. The Dragoons won three Victoria Crosses for their actions during the battle of Leliefontein, the most in any battle with the exception of the Battle of Vimy Ridge in World War I.
Boschbult	On 31 March 1902, a British-Canadian force was dispatched by General Sir Frederick Walter Kitchener to pursue a 2,500 man strong Boer force. At 1:30 pm, the main force of the column encountered the main 2,500 strong Boer force and became encircled. The 2nd Canadian Mounted Rifles, who had been guarding the baggage train, made a series of charges in order to relieve pressure on the encircled British force. 21 Canadians from 3 and 4 Troops of 'E' Squadron, under the command of Wallace Bruce Matthews Carruthers became cut off from the main force during a charge, but rather than surrender they fought to the last, eventually running out of ammunition and being overrun. By 5:00 pm, the Boers withdrew.

=== India ===
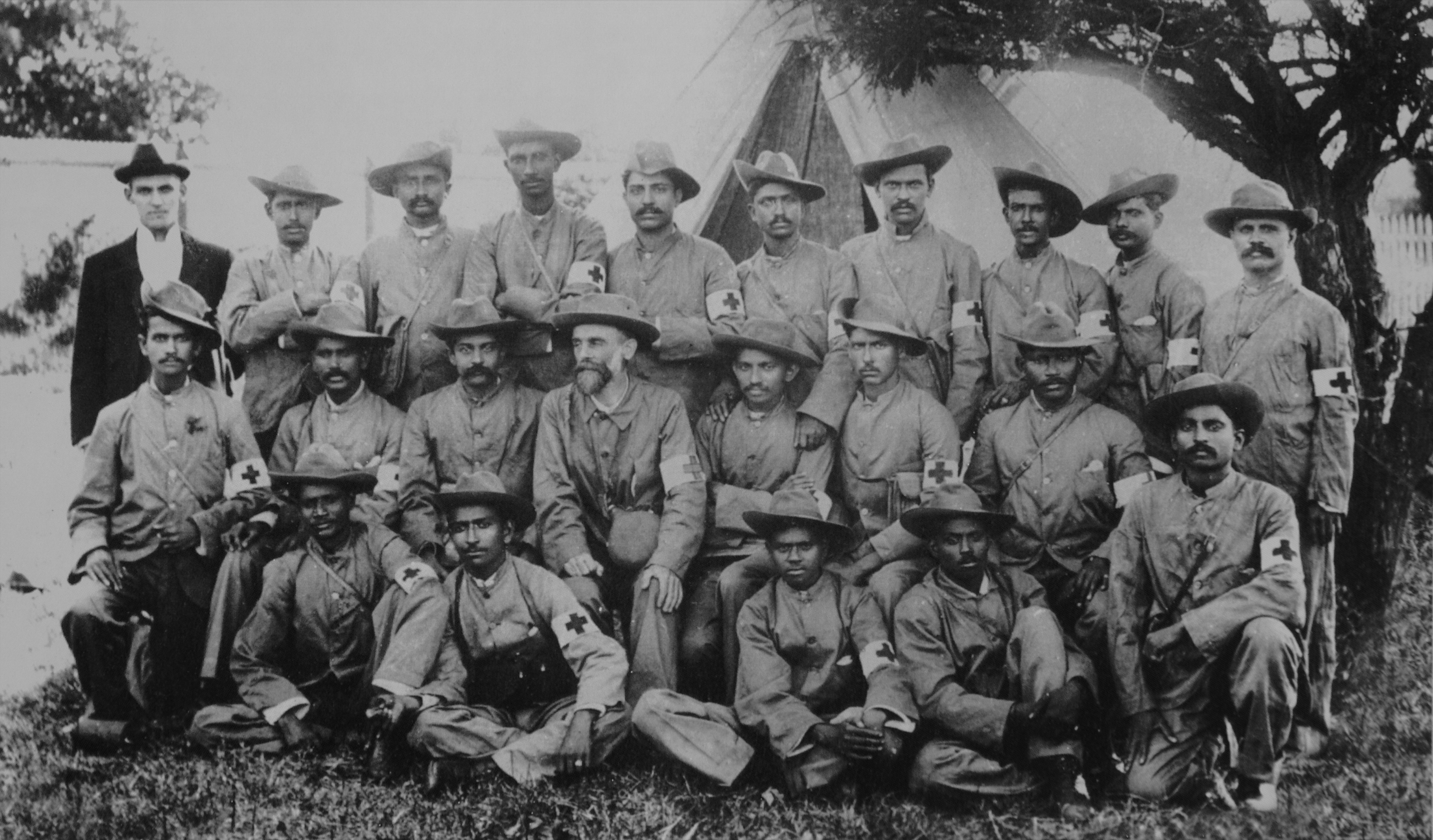
Natal Indian Ambulance Corps with future leader Mohandas K. Gandhi (Middle row, 5th from left)

British garrisons in India contributed 18,534 British officers and men, as well as an estimated 10,000 Indian auxiliaries deployed to assist them. India also sent 7,000 horses, ponies and mules. Indian auxiliaries were only employed in non-combatant roles.

The Natal Indian Ambulance Corps, created by Gandhi and financed by the local Indian community, served at the battles of Colenso and Spion Kop.

=== New Zealand ===
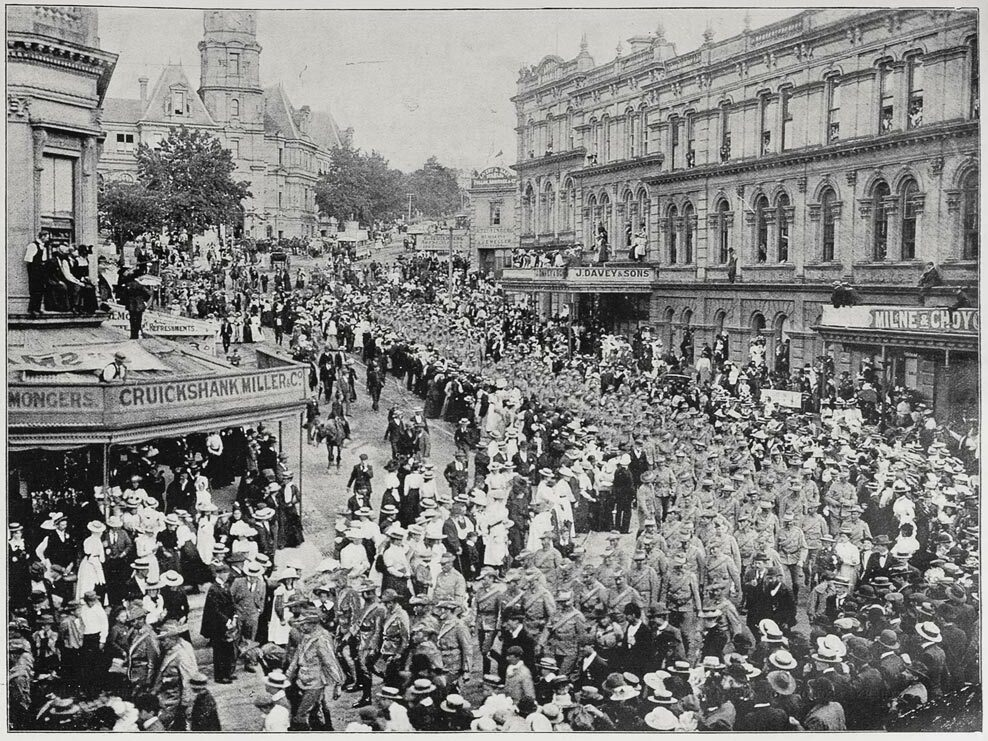
New Zealand troops marching down Wellesley Street, Auckland, to embark for South Africa

When war seemed imminent, New Zealand offered its support. On 28 September 1899, Prime Minister Richard Seddon asked Parliament to approve the offer to the imperial government of a contingent of mounted rifles, thus becoming the first British Colony to send troops to the war. The British position in the dispute with the Transvaal was "moderate and righteous", he maintained. He stressed the "crimson tie" of Empire that bound New Zealand to the mother-country and the importance of a strong British Empire for the colony's security.

10 contingents of volunteers, totalling nearly 6,500 men from New Zealand, with 8,000 horses fought in the conflict, along with doctors, nurses, veterinary surgeons and school teachers. 70 New Zealanders died from enemy action, with another 158 killed accidentally or by disease. The first New Zealander killed was Farrier Bradford at Jasfontein Farm on 18 December 1899. The war was greeted with enthusiasm when the war was over, and peace greeted with patriotism and national pride. This is best shown by the fact that the Third, Fourth and Fifth contingents from New Zealand were funded by public conscription.

=== Rhodesia ===
Rhodesian military units such as the British South Africa Police, Rhodesia Regiment and Southern Rhodesian Volunteers served in the war.

=== South Africa ===
During the war, the British army included substantial contingents from South Africa itself. There were large communities of English-speaking immigrants and settlers in Natal and Cape Colony, which formed volunteer units that took the field, or local "town guards". At one stage of the war, a "Colonial Division", consisting of five light horse and infantry units under Brigadier General Edward Brabant, took part in the invasion of the Orange Free State. Part of it withstood a siege by Christiaan de Wet at Wepener on the borders of Basutoland. Another large source of volunteers was the uitlander community, many of whom hastily left Johannesburg in the days immediately preceding the war.

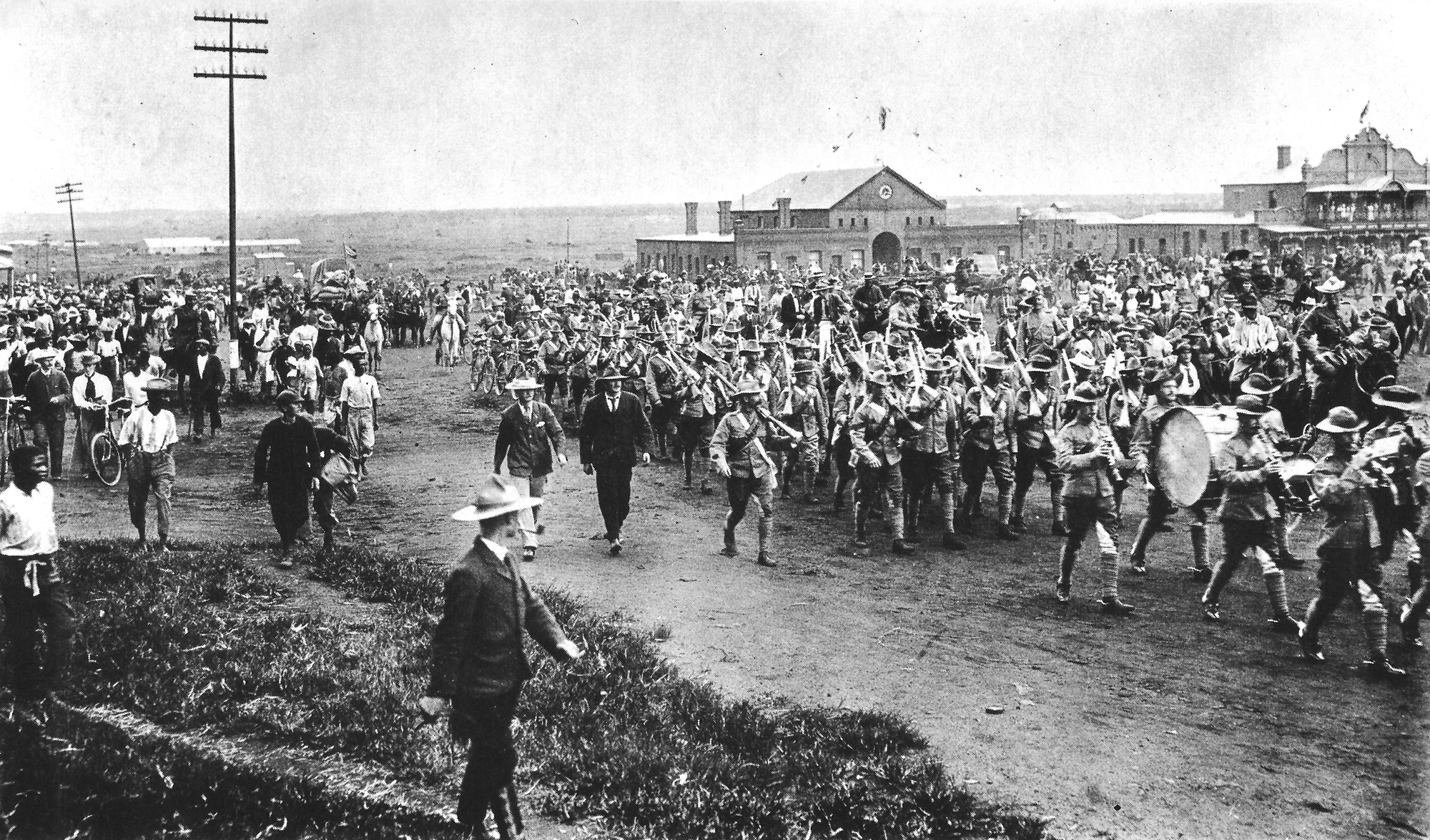
Rhodesian volunteers leaving Salisbury for service in the Second Boer War, 1899

Later during the war, Kitchener attempted to form a Boer Police Force, as part of his efforts to pacify the occupied areas and effect a reconciliation with the Boer community. The members of this force were despised as traitors by the Boers still in the field. Boers who attempted to remain neutral after giving their parole to British forces were derided as "hensoppers" (hands-uppers) and often coerced into giving support to the Boer guerrillas (which was one reason for British scorched earth campaigns throughout the countryside and detention of Boers in concentration camps, to deny anything of use to the guerrillas).

Like the Canadian, and particularly the Australian and New Zealand contingents, many volunteer units formed by South Africans were "light horse" or mounted infantry, well-suited to the countryside and manner of warfare. Some regular British officers scorned their comparative lack of formal discipline, but the light horse units were hardier and more suited to campaigning than the overloaded British cavalry, who were still obsessed with the charge by lance or sabre. (Note: British cavalry travelled light compared with earlier campaigns, but were still expected to carry all kit with them on campaign owing to distances covered on the Veldt.) At their peak, 24,000 South Africans served in the field in "colonial" units. Notable units (in addition to the Imperial Light Horse) were the South African Light Horse, Rimington's Guides, Kitchener's Horse and the Imperial Light Infantry.

== Other nations ==
The United States of America stayed neutral, but some Americans were eager to participate. Early in the war Lord Roberts cabled Major Frederick Russell Burnham, a veteran of both Matabele wars but then prospecting in the Klondike, to serve on his personal staff as Chief of Scouts. Burnham went on to receive the highest awards of any American who served in the war. American mercenaries participated on both sides.

Portugal had considerable dealings with the South African Republic through Portuguese Mozambique. The war broke out while Portugal was engaged in its own pacification campaigns in Africa and after the 1890 British Ultimatum Portuguese public opinion was highly favourable to the Boers, but the Portuguese government chose not to hostilize the United Kingdom. Instead it took the opportunity to mend bilateral relations and reaffirm the Anglo-Portuguese alliance through the signing of the Second Treaty of Windsor, by which Britain recognized Portuguese claims in Africa and reaffirmed its pledge to help defend Portugal as well as its overseas empire against all enemies "future and present", in exchange for Portugal not declaring neutrality and providing aid against the Boers, namely by blocking the passage of weapons and ammunitions through its territory and allowing Britain the use of its port facilities. In 1900, 700 Boers crossed into Mozambique to seek refuge, but this group soon grew to 1400-2500. 700-900 were transported to Caldas da Rainha in Portugal, where they were kept until the end of the war. Yet the Boers were treated reasonably well and their relationship with the Portuguese authorities and population was cordial, with Boer C. Plokhooy writing that "life at Caldas da Rainha is certainly becoming pleasant, and who dares grumble about it grumbles without cause".

== Aftermath and analysis ==
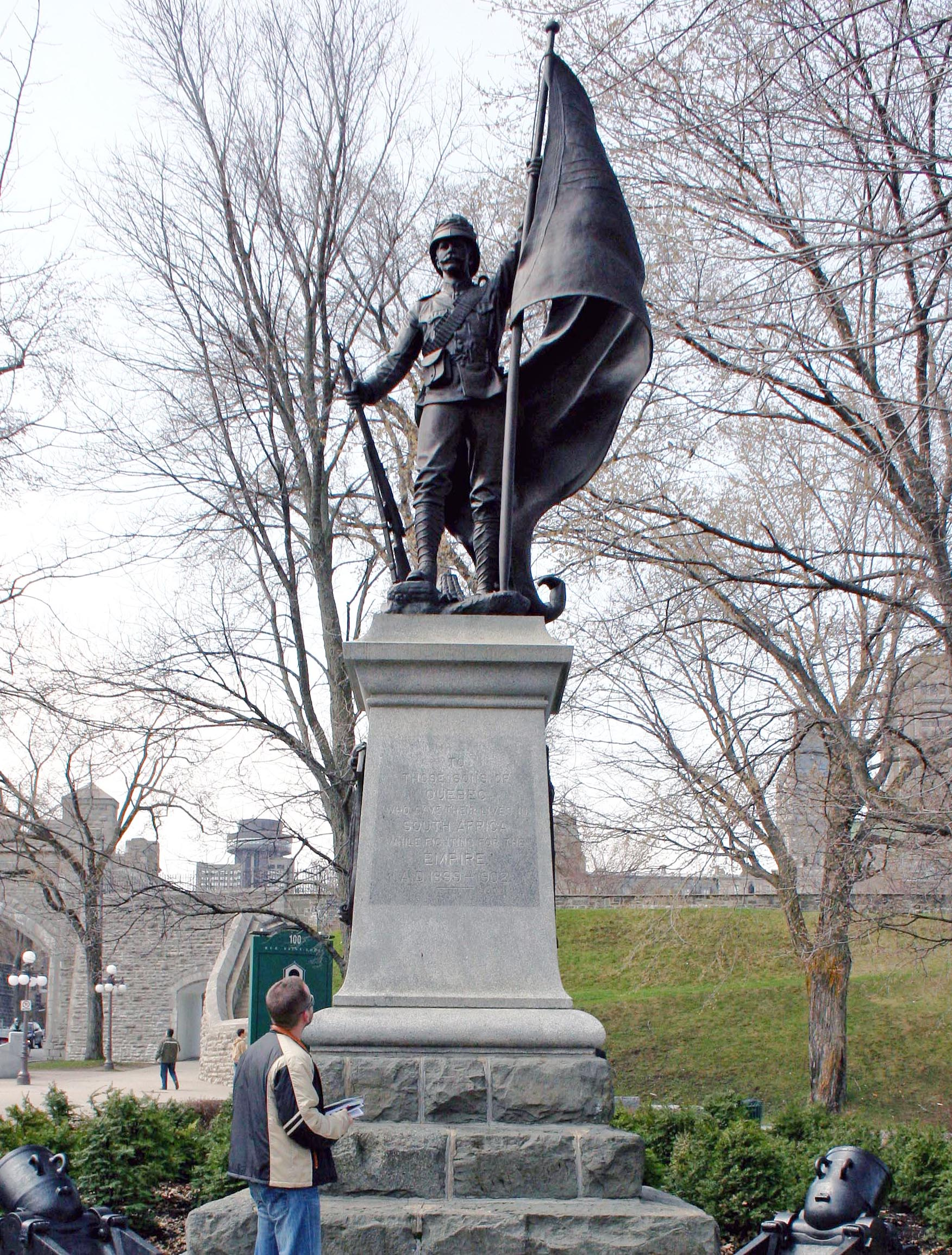
Memorial to soldiers in Quebec City

The war cast long shadows over the history of the South African region. The predominantly agrarian society of the former Boer republics was profoundly and fundamentally affected by the scorched earth policy. The devastation of Boer and black African populations in the concentration camps and through war and exile, were to have a lasting effect on the demography and quality of life in the region.

Many exiles and former Boer prisoners were unable to return to their farms; others attempted to, but were forced to abandon them as unworkable given the damage caused by farm burning during the scorched earth policy. Destitute Boers and black Africans swelled the ranks of the unskilled urban poor competing with the "uitlanders" in the mines.

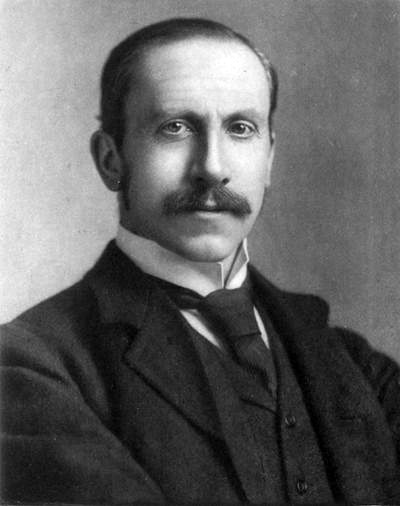
Alfred, Lord Milner, was the British High Commissioner of Southern Africa. He was involved from the start of the war and had a role in the peace process and the creation of the Union of South Africa.

The postwar reconstruction administration was presided over by Lord Milner and his Oxford-educated Milner's Kindergarten. This group of civil servants had a profound effect on the region, eventually leading to the Union of South Africa:

In the aftermath of the war, an imperial administration freed from accountability to a domestic electorate set about reconstructing an economy that was by then predicated unambiguously on gold. At the same time, British civil servants, municipal officials, and their cultural adjuncts were hard at work in the heartland of the former Boer Republics helping to forge new identities—first as 'British South Africans' and then, later still, as 'white South Africans'.

Some scholars identify these new identities as partly underpinning the act of union that followed in 1910. Although challenged by a Boer rebellion only four years later, they did much to shape South African politics between the two world wars and to the present day.

Many Boers referred to the war as the second of the Freedom Wars. The most resistant of Boers wanted to continue the fight and were known as "Bittereinders" (or irreconcilables) and at the end of the war some Boer fighters such as Deneys Reitz chose exile rather than sign an oath, like the following, to pledge allegiance to Britain:

The bearer, <prisoner name> has been released from prison of war camp <Camp name> on signing that he acknowledge terms of surrender and becomes a British subject.

Over the following decade, many returned to South Africa and never signed the pledge. Some, like Reitz, eventually reconciled themselves to the new status quo, but others did not.

=== Union of South Africa ===
One of the most important events in the decade after the war was the creation of the Union of South Africa (later the Republic of South Africa). It proved a key ally to Britain as a Dominion of the British Empire during the World Wars. At the start of the First World War a crisis ensued when the South African government led by Louis Botha and other former Boer fighters, such as Jan Smuts, declared support for Britain and agreed to send troops to take over the German colony of German South-West Africa (Namibia).

Many Boers were opposed to fighting for Britain, especially against Germany, which had been sympathetic to their struggle. Some bittereinders and their allies took part in a revolt known as the Maritz rebellion. The rebellion was quickly suppressed, and the leading Boer rebels escaped lightly (especially compared with leading Irish rebels of the Easter Rising), with imprisonment of 6-7 years and heavy fines. Two years later, they were released from prison, as Louis Botha recognised the value of reconciliation.

=== Military legacy ===
The war was the harbinger of a new type of combat: guerrilla warfare. The counterinsurgency techniques and lessons learned (restriction of movement, containment of space, targeting of anything that could give sustenance to guerrillas, harassment through sweeper groups coupled with rapid reaction forces, sourcing and co-ordination of intelligence, and nurturing of native allies) were used by the British, and other forces, in future guerrilla campaigns including to counter Malayan communist rebels during the Malayan Emergency. In World War II the British adopted concepts of raiding from the Boer commandos when they set up special raiding forces, and in acknowledgement chose the name British Commandos.

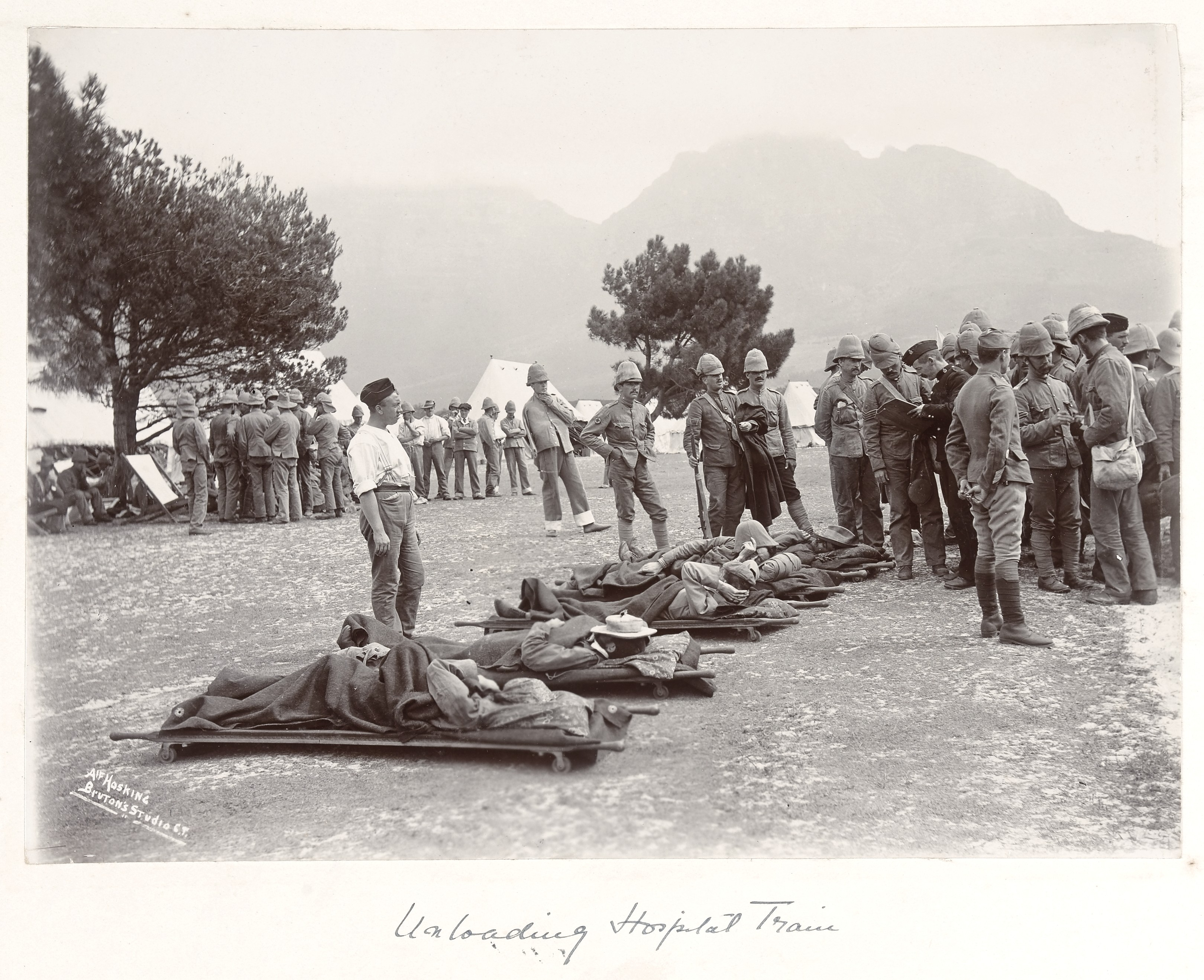
Unloading the hospital train with wounded British soldiers, around 1900. Nurse Constance Louisa Agg's album.

After the Boer War, the British army underwent reform focused on lessening the emphasis placed on mounted units. It was determined that the traditional role of cavalry was antiquated and improperly used on the battlefield in the Boer War, and the First World War was the proof that mounted attacks had no place in twentieth century combat. Cavalry was put to better use after the reforms in the theatres of the Middle East and World War I, and the idea of mounted infantry was useful in times when war was more mobile. An example was during the First World War during the Battle of Mons, in which the British cavalry held the Belgian town against German assault.

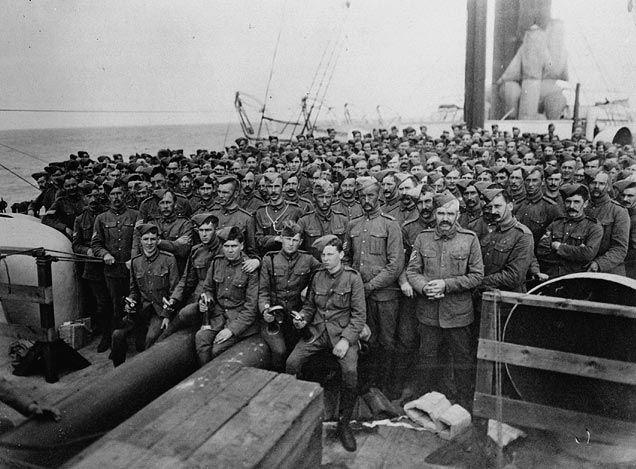
Canadian soldiers of Lord Strathcona's Horse en route to South Africa in 1899.

The Boer war was the beginning of types of conflict involving machine guns, shrapnel and observation balloons which were all used extensively in the First World War. Both sides used a scorched earth policy to deprive the marching enemy of food. And both had to corral civilians into makeshift huts by 'concentrating' them into camps. For example, at Buffelspoort, British soldiers were held in captivity in Boer encampments after surrendering their arms, and civilians were often mixed in with service personnel because the Boers did not have the resources to do otherwise. 116,000 women, children and Boer soldiers were confined to the Commonwealth concentration camps, of which at least 28,000 would die.

The British saw their tactics of scorched earth and concentration camps as a legitimate way of depriving the Boer guerrillas of supplies and safe havens. The Boers saw them as a British attempt to coerce the Boers into surrender, with the camp inmates—mainly families of Boer fighters—seen as deliberately kept in poor conditions to encourage high death rates. Even in the 21st-century, the controversy around the British tactics continued to make headlines.

=== Effect on British and international politics ===
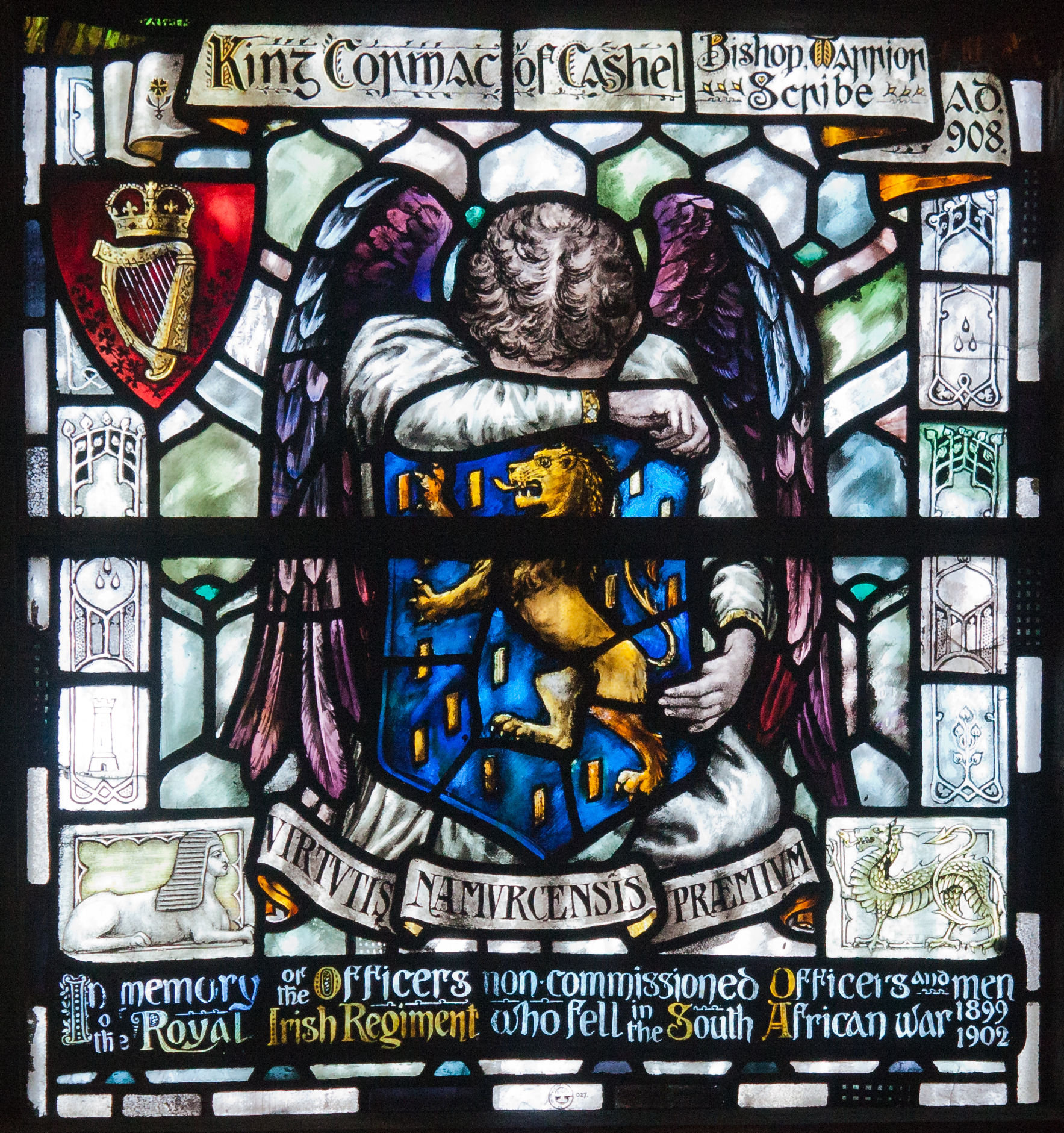
Memorial window from St Patrick's Cathedral, Dublin by An Túr Gloine. Many Irish Republicans sympathised with the Boer side, rather than the British side on which fought the Royal Irish Regiment.

Many Irish nationalists sympathised with the Boers as oppressed by British imperialism, much like they viewed themselves. Irish miners already in the Transvaal at the start of the war formed the nucleus of two Irish commandos. The Second Irish Brigade was headed by an Australian of Irish parents, Colonel Arthur Lynch. Groups of Irish volunteers went to fight with the Boers—despite the fact that there were many Irish troops fighting in the British army, including the Royal Dublin Fusiliers. (Note: "Although some 30,000 Irishmen served in the British Army under Irish General Lord Frederick Roberts, who had been Commander of Chief of British Forces in Ireland prior to his transfer to South Africa, some historians argue that the sympathies of many of their compatriots lay with the Boers. Nationalist-controlled local authorities passed pro-Boer resolutions and there were proposals to confer civic honours on Boer leader, Paul Kruger." (Irish Ambassador Daniel Mulhall written for History Ireland, 2004.)) In Britain, the "Pro-Boer" campaign expanded, (Note: Lloyd George and Keir Hardie were members of the Stop the War Committee (See the founder's biography: William T. Stead's.) Many British authors gave their "Pro-Boer" opinions in British press, such as G. K. Chesterton's writing to 1905 – (see Rice University Chesterton's poetry analysis)) with writers often idealising the Boer society.

The war highlighted the dangers of Britain's policy of non-alignment and deepened her isolation. The 1900 UK general election, also known as the "Khaki election", was called by the Prime Minister, Lord Salisbury, on the back of British victories. There was much enthusiasm for the war at this point, resulting in a victory for the Conservative government. However, support waned as it became apparent the war would not be easy and it dragged on, partially contributing to the Conservatives' spectacular defeat in 1906. There was outrage at scorched earth tactics and conditions in the concentration camps. It became apparent there were serious problems with public health in Britain as up to 40% of recruits in Britain were unfit for conscription, and suffered from medical problems such as rickets and other poverty-related illnesses. This came at a time of increasing concern for the poor in Britain.

22,000 Empire troops were killed. Britain had expected a swift victory against a mostly unmilitarised and predominantly agricultural-based opponent. Britain was the world's most technologically advanced military. The results caused many both domestically and internationally to question the dominance of the British Empire, especially as nations like the US, Germany, and Japan had become major powers.

=== Cost ===
It is estimated that the cost of the war to the British government was £211,156,000 (equivalent to £2.63945×10^{10} in 2022).

Cost of War over its entire course
Year	Cost at the time	Relative value in 2024
1899–1900	£23,000,000	£3.1970×10^{9}
1900–1901	£63,737,000	£8.8594×10^{9}
1901–1902	£67,670,000	£9.4061×10^{9}
1902–1903	£47,500,000	£6.6025×10^{9}
Sub-total	£201,907,000	£2.80651×10^{10}
Interest	£9,249,000	£1.2856×10^{9}
Grand total	£211,156,000	£2.93507×10^{10}

=== Horses ===
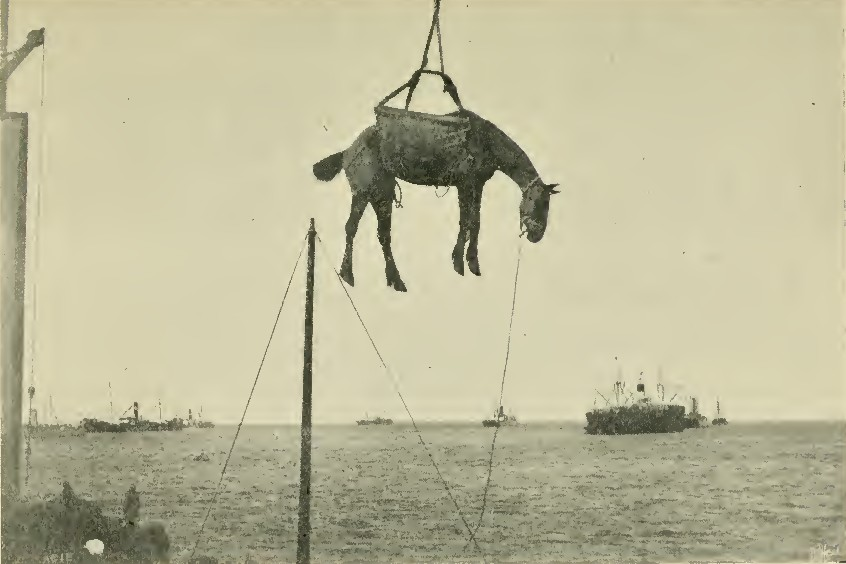
A horse destined to serve in the war, being offloaded in Port Elizabeth

The number of horses killed was unprecedented in modern warfare. The wastage was particularly heavy among British forces for several reasons: overloading of horses with unnecessary equipment and saddlery, failure to rest and acclimatise horses after long sea voyages and, poor management by inexperienced mounted troops and distant control by unsympathetic staffs. The average life expectancy of a British horse, from the time of its arrival in Port Elizabeth, was around six weeks.

Most horses and mules brought to South Africa came from the US. In total, 109,878 horses and 81,524 mules were shipped from New Orleans to South Africa in 166 voyages from October 1899 to June 1902. The cost of these animals and their transport was an average of US$597,978 per month. A significant number of horses and mules died during the transit; for example, during the SS Manchester City's 36-day passage, 187 of her 2,090 mules died.

Horses were slaughtered for their meat when needed. During the sieges of Kimberley and Ladysmith, horses were consumed as food once regular sources were depleted. The besieged British forces in Ladysmith also produced chevril, a Bovril-like paste, by boiling down the horse meat to a jelly paste and serving it like beef tea.

The Horse Memorial in Port Elizabeth is a tribute to the 300,000 horses that died during the conflict.

=== Commemorations ===
The Australian National Boer War Memorial Committee organises events to mark the war on 31 May each year. In Canberra, a commemorative service is usually held at the St John the Baptist Church in Reid. Floral tributes are laid for the dead.

== See also ==
- Artillery in the Second Boer War
- British logistics in the Second Boer War
- First Italo-Ethiopian War
- History of South Africa
- List of Second Boer War battles
- List of Second Boer War Victoria Cross recipients
- London to Ladysmith via Pretoria
- Military history of South Africa
- Volkstaat

== Citations ==
- Berger, Carl (1971). The Sense of Power: Studies in the Ideas of Canadian Imperialism 1867–1914. University of Toronto Press. pp. 233–234. ISBN 978-0-8020-6113-3. OCLC 1036947483. Archived from the original on 27 January 2014.
- Bester, R. (1994). Boer Rifles and Carbines of the Anglo–Boer War. Bloemfontein: War Museum of the Boer Republics.
- Blake, Albert (2010). Boereverraaier [Farmer Traitor] (in Afrikaans). Tafelberg. p. 46.
- "Case Name: Anglo–Boer: Britain's Vietnam (1899–1902)". American University of Washington, D.C., Trade Environment projects. Archived from the original on 27 October 2016.
- Clodfelter, Micheal (2017). Warfare and Armed Conflicts: A Statistical Encyclopedia of Casualty and Other Figures, 1492–2015 (4th ed.). McFarland & Company. ISBN 978-0786474707.
- Davidson, Apollon; Filatova, Irina (1998). The Russians and the Anglo–Boer War, 1899–1902. Cape Town: Human & Rousseau. ISBN 0-7981-3804-1.
- Desai, Ashwin; Vahed, Goolem (2015). The South African Gandhi: Stretcher-bearer of Empire. Stanford University Press.
- Chase, Sean (4 November 2012). "Dragoons remember the heroes of Leliefontein". The Daily Observer. Archived from the original on 28 June 2018.
- Duffy, Michael (22 August 2009). "Sam Hughes Biography". firstworldwar.com.
- Cameron, Trewhella, ed. (1986). An Illustrated History of South Africa. Johannesburg: Jonathan Ball. p. 207.
- Cartwright, A. P. (1964). The Dynamite Company. Cape Town: Purnell & Sons. LCCN 66045554. OCLC 12425694.
- Cloete, Pieter Gerhardus (2000). The Anglo-Boer War: A Chronology. Pretoria: J.P. van der Walt. ISBN 0-7993-2632-1.
- Davis, Richard Harding (1900). With Both Armies in South Africa. Charles Scribner Sons. p. 34, fn. 59.
- "Caring for the soldiers health". Nash's war manual. London: Eveleigh Nash. 1914. p. 309.
- Farwell, Byron (March 1976). "Taking Sides in the Boer War". American Heritage Magazine. 20 (3). ISSN 0002-8738. Archived from the original on 7 January 2009.
- Ferguson, Niall (2002). Empire: The Rise and Demise of the British World Order and the Lessons for Global Power. Basic Books. p. 235.
- Grundlingh, Albert (1980). "Collaborators in Boer Society". In Warwick, P. (ed.). The South African War. London. pp. 258–278.
- Granatstein, J.L. (2010). The Oxford Companion to Canadian Military History. Oxford University Press. ISBN 978-0-19-543088-2.
- Grattan, Robert (2009). "The Entente in World War I: a case study in strategy formulation in an alliance". Journal of Management History. 15 (2): 147–158. doi:10.1108/17511340910943796.
- Gronum, M.A. (1977). Die ontplooiing van die Engelse Oorlog 1899–1900 [The Deployment of the English War 1899–1900] (in Afrikaans). Tafelberg. ISBN 978-0-624-01009-8.
- Haydon, A.P. (1964). "South Australia's first war". Australian Historical Studies. 11 (42).
- Inglis, Brian (1974). Roger Casement. London: Coronet Books. pp. 53–55.
- Jeffery, Keith (2000). "The Irish Soldier in the Boer War". In Gooch, John (ed.). The Boer War. London: Cass. p. 145. cites
- Jacson, M. (2007) [1908]. "II". The Record of a Regiment of the Line. Hutchinson & Company. p. 88. ISBN 978-1-4264-9111-5.
- Jones, Maurig (1996). "Blockhouses of the Boer War". Colonial Conquest, magweb. Archived from the original on 13 May 2008.
- Jones, Huw M. (October 1999). "Neutrality compromised: Swaziland and the Anglo–Boer War, 1899–1902". Military History Journal. 11 (3/4). Archived from the original on 22 December 2015.
- Judd, Denis; Surridge, Keith (2013). The Boer War: A History (2nd ed.). London: I.B. Tauris. ISBN 978-1-78076-591-4.excerpt and text search; a standard scholarly history
- Keppel-Jones, Arthur (1983). Rhodes and Rhodesia: The White Conquest of Zimbabwe, 1884–1902. Montreal, Quebec and Kingston, Ontario: McGill-Queen's University Press. pp. 590–599. ISBN 978-0-7735-0534-6.
- McElwee, William (1974). The Art of War: Waterloo to Mons. London: Purnell. pp. 223–229. ISBN 0-253-31075-X.
- Marsh, Peter T. (1994). Joseph Chamberlain: Entrepreneur in Politics. Yale University Press. pp. 482–522.
- Meintjes, Johannes (1974). President Paul Kruger: A Biography (First ed.). London: Cassell. ISBN 978-0-304-29423-7.
- Morris, Michael; Linnegar, John (2004). "Chapter 3: Being in Touch". Every Step of the Way: The Journey to Freedom in South Africa. Ministry of Education. pp. 58–95. ISBN 0-7969-2061-3.
- Nasson, Bill (2011). The War for South Africa: The Anglo–Boer War (1899–1902). Abacus. ISBN 978-0349104669.
- Nathan, M. (1941). Paul Kruger: His Life And Times. Durban: Knox.
- O'Brien, P. (1988). The Costs and Benefits of British Imperialism 1846–1914. Past & Present.
- O'Leary, Michael (29 December 1999). "Regimental Rouge – Battles of the Boer War". Regimental Rouge.
- Onselen, Charles van (1982). "Chapter 1: New Babylon". Studies in the Social and Economic History of the Witwatersrand, 1886–1914. London: Longman. ISBN 978-0-582-64384-0.
- Onselen, Charles van (October 2003). "'The Modernization of the Zuid Afrikaansche Republiek: F. E. T. Krause, J. C. Smuts, and the Struggle for the Johannesburg Public Prosecutor's Office, 1898–1899". Law and History Review. 21 (3). American Society for Legal History: 483–526. doi:10.2307/3595118. JSTOR 3595118. S2CID 145286422.
- Pakenham, Thomas (1979). The Boer War. New York: Random House. ISBN 0-394-42742-4.
- Pakenham, Thomas (1991) [1979]. The Boer War. London: Cardinal. p. 571. ISBN 0-7474-0976-5.
- Pakenham, Thomas (1991a). The Scramble for Africa. Avon Books. p. 573. ISBN 0-380-71999-1.
- Peddie, John (22 August 2009). "John McCrae Biography". firstworldwar.com.
- Ploeger, Jan (1985). "Burgers in Britse Diens (1902)" [Citizens in British Service]. Scientia Militaria (in Afrikaans). 15 (1): 15–22.
- Pocock, Roger S. (1998) [1917]. Horses (Microfiche ed.). London: J. Murray. p. viii fn. 11. ISBN 0-665-99382-X.
- Powell, Sean-Andre (2015). How Did Winston S. Churchill's Experience As A Prisoner of War: During The Boer War Affect His Leadership Style And Career?. Pickle Partners Publishing.
- Pretorius, Fransjohan (2000). "The Experience of the Bitter-Ender Boer". In Gooch, John (ed.). The Boer War: Direction, Experience and Image. London: Cass. p. 179.
- Pretorius, Fransjohan (2011). "Anglo–Boer war". In Jacobs, S.; Johnson, K. (eds.). Encyclopedia of South Africa.
- Pulsifer, Cameron (2017). "For Queen and Country: Canadians and the South African War". Canadian War Museum.
- Scott, John L. (2007). "British Concentration Camps of the Second South African War (The Transvaal, 1900–1902)".
- "The South African War 1899–1902". South African History Online. 10 November 2011.
- Searle, G.R. (2004). A new England?: peace and war, 1886–1918. Oxford University Press. pp. 269–307.
- Spies, S.B. (1977). Methods of Barbarism: Roberts and Kitchener and Civilians in the Boer Republics January 1900 – May 1902. Cape Town: Human & Rousseau. p. 265.
- Sibbald, Raymond (1993). The War Correspondents: The Boer War. Bramley Books. ISBN 1-85833-733-X.
- Stirling, John (17 February 2009). "Gordon Highlanders (extract)". Our Regiments in South Africa. Naval and Military Press.
- Surridge, Keith (2000). "Lansdowne at the War Office". In Gooch, John (ed.). The Boer War: Direction, Experience and Image. London: Cass. p. 24.
- Swardt, Eric (1998). "The JJ Potgieter Manuscript" (PDF). p. 97. Archived from the original (PDF) on 16 August 2010.
- Villiers, J.C. de (June 1984). "The Medical Aspect of the Anglo–Boer War, 1899–1902 Part ll". Military History Journal. 6 (3).
- Warwick, Peter (1983). Black People and the South African War, 1899–1902. Cambridge University Press.
- Watt, S (December 1982). "Intombi Military Hospital and Cemetery". Military History Journal. 5 (6). Die Suid-Afrikaanse Krygshistoriese Vereniging/The South African Military History Association.
- Webb, Peter (2010). "The Silent Flag in the New Fallen Snow: Sara Jeannette Duncan and the Legacy of the South African War". Journal of Canadian Studies. 44 (1). University of Toronto Press: 75–90. doi:10.3138/jcs.44.1.75. S2CID 141755145.
- Wessels, André (2000). "Afrikaners at War". In Gooch, John (ed.). The Boer War: Direction, Experience and Image. London: Cass.
- Wessels, André (2010). A Century of Postgraduate Anglo–Boer War (1899–1902) Studies: Masters' and Doctoral Studies Completed at Universities in South Africa, in English-speaking Countries and on the European Continent, 1908–2008. African Sun Media. p. 32. ISBN 978-1-920383-09-1.
- Wessels, André (2011). The Anglo–Boer War 1889–1902: White Man's War, Black Man's War, Traumatic War. African Sun Media. p. 79. ISBN 978-1-920383-27-5.
- Wessels, Elria (2009). "Boers positions in the Klipriviersberg". Veldslae-Anglo–Boereoorlog 1899–1902. Archived from the original on 14 February 2013.
- Wilcox, Craig (2002). Australia's Boer War: The War in South Africa, 1899–1902. Oxford University Press. ISBN 978-0-19-551637-1.
- Witton, George (2003). Scapegoats of the Empire: The True Story of Breaker Morant's Bushveldt Carbineers. excerpt
- Yap, Melanie; Leong Man, Dainne (1996). Colour, Confusion and Concessions: The History of the Chinese in South Africa. Hong Kong: Hong Kong University Press. p. 510. ISBN 9-6220-9423-6.

== Historiography ==
- Krebs, Paula M. (1999). Gender, Race, and the Writing of Empire: Public Discourse and the Boer War. Cambridge studies in nineteenth-century literature and culture. Cambridge; New York: Cambridge University Press. ISBN 978-0-521-65322-0.
- Seibold, Birgit Susanne (2011). Emily Hobhouse and the Reports on the Concentration Camps during the Boer War, 1899-1902: Two Different Perspectives. Stuttgart: Columbia University Press. ISBN 978-3-8382-0320-1. OCLC 794175960.
- Van Hartesveldt, Fred R. (2000). The Boer War: Historiography and Annotated Bibliography. Bibliographies of battles and leaders. Westport, Conn: Greenwood Press. ISBN 978-0-313-03236-3.
