= George Lee (Australian general) =

Australian general (1860–1939)

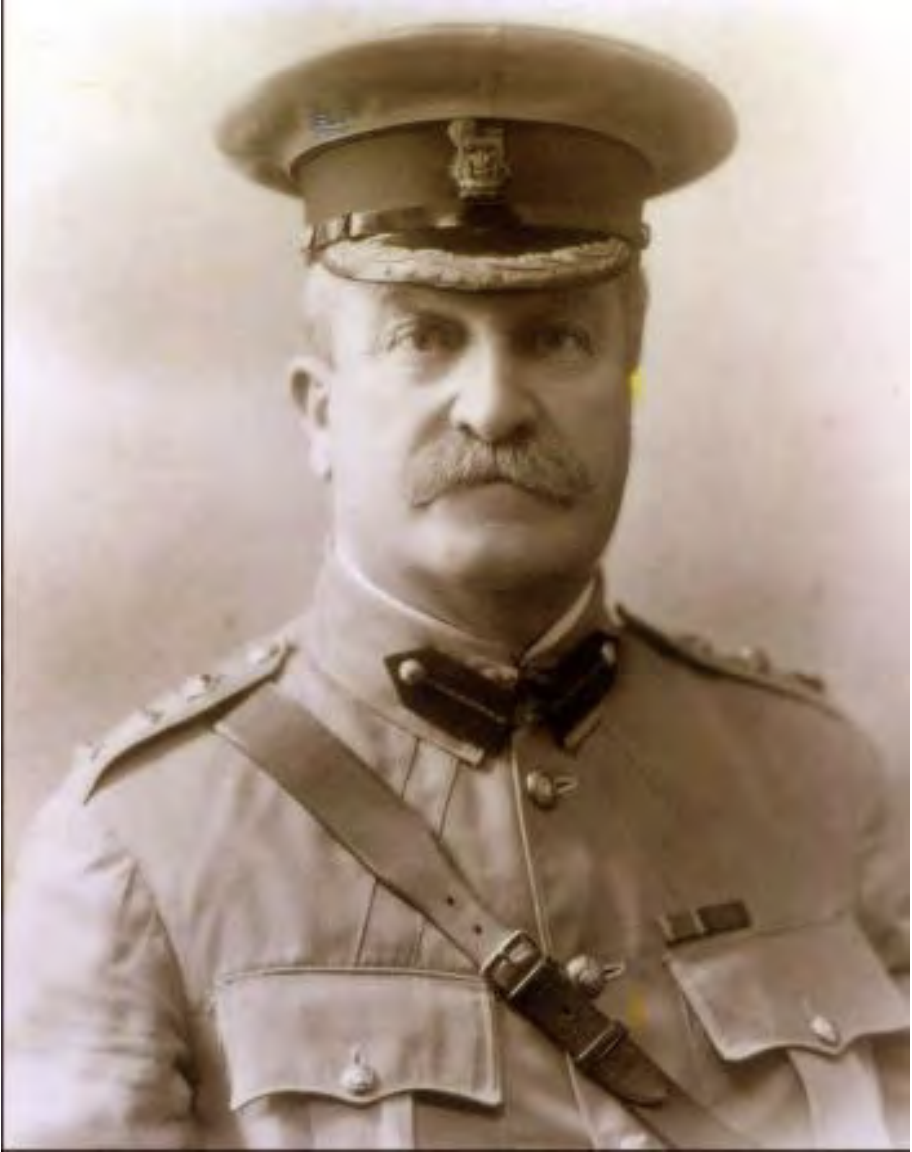
- Colonel George Lee in c. 1916
- Born: 25 June 1860; West Maitland, New South Wales
- Died: 13 April 1939 (aged 78); Burwood, New South Wales
- Military career
- Allegiance: Colony of New South Wales; Australia
- Branch: New South Wales Military Forces; Australian Military Forces
- Service years: 1889–1920
- Rank: Lieutenant General
- Commands: 2nd Military District (1917–1920); 1st Military District (1912–1917); 6th Military District (1911–1912); Special School of Instruction (1910–1911); New South Wales Lancers Contingent (1899–1900); Cavalry School of Instruction (1895–1897)
- Conflicts: Second Boer War; Relief of Kimberley; Battle of Paardeberg; Battle of Poplar Grove; Battle of Driefontein; Advance on Pretoria; Battle of Zand River; Battle of Doornkop; Battle of Diamond Hill; Battle of Bergendal; First World War
- Awards: Companion of the Order of St Michael and St George; Distinguished Service Order; Mentioned in Despatches

Lieutenant General George Leonard Lee, CMG, DSO (25 June 1860 – 13 April 1939) was a senior officer in the early Australian Military Forces. While working as a storekeeper, Lee joined the New South Wales Lancers in 1889. He was commissioned into the New South Wales Permanent Forces in 1892, was commandant of the Cavalry School of Instruction from 1895 to 1897, and commanded a contingent from the New South Wales Lancers in South Africa during the Second Boer War. He led the Lancers in some 30 engagements between January and October 1900 and was awarded the Distinguished Service Order and Mentioned in Despatches for his leadership.

Shortly after his return to Australia, Lee joined the Australian Military Forces following the Federation of Australia and, over the next decade, served in increasingly senior positions in the Administrative and Instructional Staff. He was commandant of military forces in the state of Tasmania (1911–1912) and in Queensland (1912–1917) and New South Wales (1917–1920) during the First World War. Lee, who was by then considered too old for overseas service, remained active on the home front. He oversaw the expansion and administration of military camps, the instruction of new recruits, the use of war essential resources and, during the Spanish flu pandemic, the housing and quarantine of returning soldiers. In recognition of his efforts, Lee was appointed a Companion of the Order of St Michael and St George in 1917 and, on his retirement in 1920, was granted the honorary rank of lieutenant general. He later managed two oyster leases in Port Stephens and died in Sydney in 1939, aged 78.

== Early life ==
George Leonard Lee was born on 25 June 1860 in West Maitland, New South Wales, the eldest of three children to Mary Ann (née Eckford) and John Lee. He was educated at Sauchu House School in West Maitland and Armidale Grammar School, after which he worked for his father's general store, John Lee & Company, in West Maitland. He was a partner in the business by 1883.

Lee married Emma Onus Town at St Ann's Anglican Church in Homebush, New South Wales, on 2 January 1896. The couple had no children.

== Military career ==
=== Junior cavalry officer ===
A keen horseman, sportsman and polo player, Lee joined the Hunter River Troop (Maitland Light Horse) of the New South Wales Lancers, a Volunteer Force unit, as a trooper on 8 July 1889. He was commissioned as a second lieutenant three months later, on 4 October, and was promoted to lieutenant on 1 January 1890. That August, during the 1890 Australian maritime dispute, Lee was among the volunteer cavalry and mounted riflemen mobilised and enrolled as a special police force in Sydney after more than 28,000 maritime and related workers went on strike in New South Wales and Victoria. Lee was adjutant of the force until the strike ended in November. In April 1891, Lee was sent to the United Kingdom for training with the British Army. He underwent instruction at the Army Service Corps School, the School of Musketry at Hythe and the Cavalry School in Canterbury, and spent several months attached to the 20th Hussars at Aldershot. During the eighteen-month secondment, he received certificates in equitation, sword and lance exercises, and the theory and practice of musketry, and qualified as an instructor to a cavalry regiment.

Lee embarked to return to Australia in October 1892 and, while still at sea, was appointed to the New South Wales Permanent Forces as a captain from 19 December. He was then posted to Sydney as adjutant of the New South Wales Lancers; a position he held until June 1902. During that time he also served as acting staff officer to the Mounted Brigade from October 1894 to February 1897 and, while temporarily holding the local rank of major, as commandant of the Cavalry School of Instruction from September 1895 to February 1897. In March 1899 a squadron from the Lancers was sent to the United Kingdom for six months of intensive cavalry training. Although subsidised by private benefactors and the Lancers' wealthy colonel, James Burns, the venture was a costly one and Lee declined command of the squadron. The men were instead led by Captain Charles Cox. Towards the end of their time at Aldershot, the Second Boer War broke out between Britain and the two Boer republics, the South African Republic and Orange Free State, and Cox convinced many of the squadron's men to volunteer for service in South Africa. The New South Wales government agreed to send the Lancers and Burns selected Lee—described by historian Craig Wilcox as "a stolid soldier and a professional one"—to command the contingent.

=== Second Boer War ===
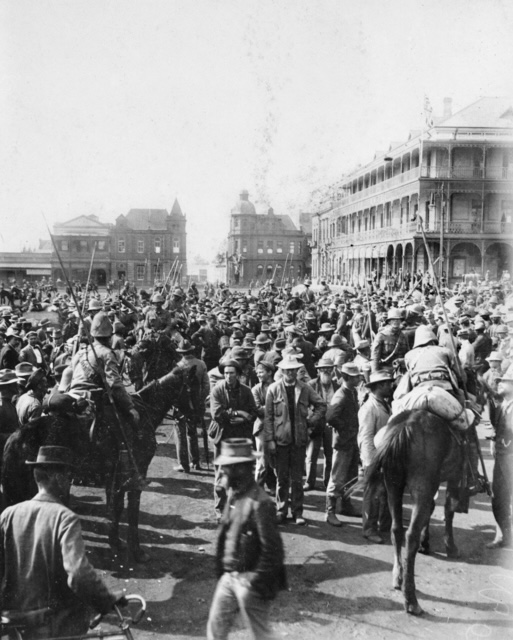
New South Wales Lancers guard Boer prisoners in Pretoria, 1900

Lee, promoted to the temporary rank of major, embarked from Sydney with a draft of 5 officers, 36 men and 160 horses on 28 October 1899. By then, Cox had already left Britain with 70 others from the squadron at Aldershot. Cox's understrength squadron landed in Cape Town on 2 November and was attached to the Cavalry Division under Lieutenant General John French, though only took a minor part in operations until Lee arrived on 6 December and assumed command of the squadron. The Lancers were largely employed in the defence of Colesberg until February 1900, when the squadron moved to Belmont and, over a period of three days, was part of the Cavalry Division's 120 kilometres (75 mi) advance to relieve the siege of Kimberley. Lee and his men, now attached to the 6th (Inniskilling) Dragoons, were engaged at Paardeberg and, during the advance to Bloemfontein, fought at Poplar Grove and Driefontein. From May, the Lancers were committed to the advance on Pretoria and took part in the engagements at Zand River, Doornkop, around Johannesburg and at Diamond Hill, during which Lee was complimented by French on the performance of his squadron while with the advance guard.

The Lancers were granted a reprieve from mid-June 1900 to rest and to resupply with fresh horses, after which Lee led his men in the Cavalry Division's advance to Middelburg. The conventional war had largely been won by this point but the Boer commandos and their guerrilla tactics remained a significant adversary, and so French had the division engage in aggressive patrols around and to the east of Middelburg. On 26 August, in an attempt to encircle the commandos of Louis Botha, French led the division north towards Bergendal farm. Lee's Lancers saw action nearby at Langkloof and Swartz Kop, but the commandos managed to escape. The squadron took part in its last major operation in October as part of a two-week, 350 kilometres (220 mi) sweep from Machadodorp to Heidelberg by the Cavalry Division. The objective was to clear three districts of armed Boers. According to historian Craig Wilcox, however, "the result was unambiguous failure" as Boer guerrillas continuously "harassed the division ... but rarely presented a target to strike at." The Lancers themselves came under fire on nine of the fourteen days. The Cavalry Division was disbanded soon after and the Lancers, with their twelve-month tour at an end, prepared to return to Australia. Lee embarked aboard the Orient at Cape Town on 13 December and, sailing via Albany, Adelaide and Melbourne, arrived in Sydney on 8 January 1901. The Lancers had taken part in 30 engagements across northern Cape Colony, the Orange Free State and the eastern Transvaal during Lee's command, and suffered two killed and three died of disease. In recognition of his leadership, Lee was Mentioned in Despatches on 10 September 1901 and awarded the Distinguished Service Order. He also received the Queen's South Africa Medal with six clasps.

=== Commonwealth Military Forces ===
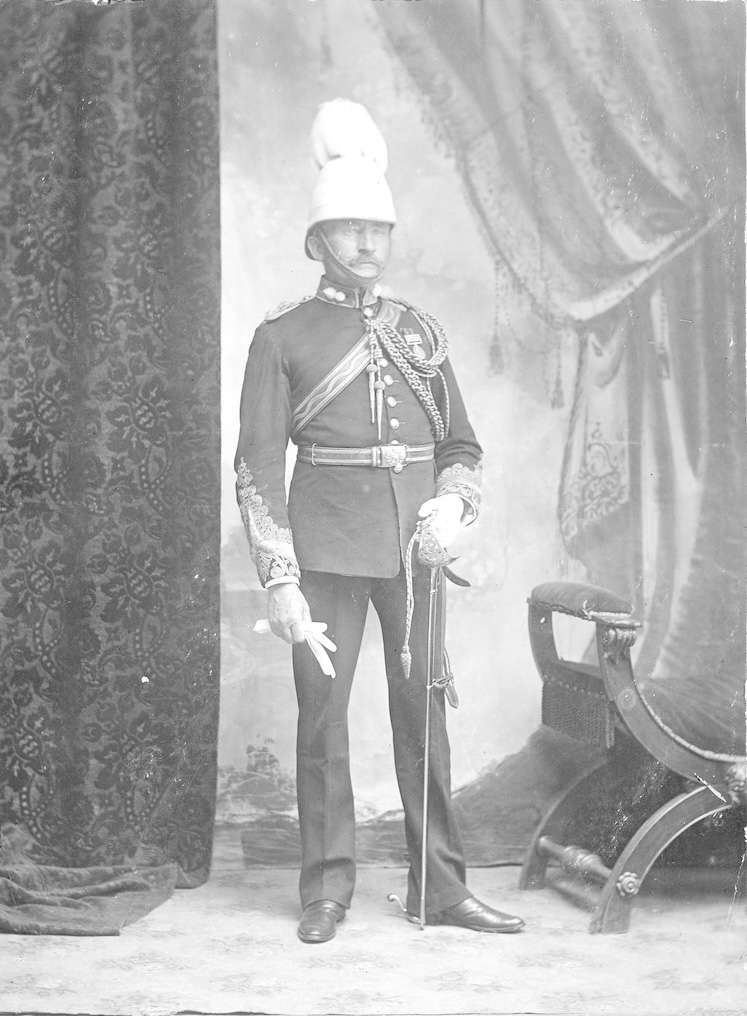
Lee in dress uniform, c. 1915

Lee arrived in Sydney one week after the Federation of Australia and, on 1 March 1901, he was transferred to the new Commonwealth Military Forces (renamed the Australian Military Forces in 1916). He resumed duties as adjutant of the New South Wales Lancers until June 1902, when he was appointed assistant adjutant-general and chief staff officer in the state of Victoria. That December, he was promoted to substantive major (with seniority from 28 October 1899) and brevet lieutenant colonel. He was appointed to the Administrative and Instructional Staff in 1904 and, in June 1907, was posted to the Administrative and Instructional Staff in New South Wales. As a substantive lieutenant colonel from 17 December 1909, he was in 1910 appointed commanding officer of the Special School of Instruction established in Albury to prepare warrant and non-commissioned officers for appointment to the Instructional Staff. He was next made acting commandant of the Military District of Tasmania in July 1911. The post was retitled as the 6th Military District that November and, the following month, Lee's appointment was confirmed and he was granted the temporary rank of colonel. As commandant, Lee was the commanding officer and chief administrator of the military forces in Tasmania.

In June 1912, Lee was confirmed as a substantive colonel and posted to Brisbane as commandant of the 1st Military District. His time in Queensland coincided with the outbreak of the First World War and the raising of the Australian Imperial Force (AIF). Considered too old for service overseas, Lee oversaw the expansion and administration of military camps in Queensland, the instruction of recruits for the AIF, and the upholding of military discipline in the state. In recognition of his achievements, Lee was appointed an aide-de-camp to the governor-general in July 1915, promoted to temporary brigadier general on 1 March 1916, and appointed a Companion of the Order of St Michael and St George in the 1917 New Year Honours. The following month, in February 1917, Lee returned to Sydney as temporary commandant of the 2nd Military District. As administrator of the most populous of Australia's military districts in the later years of the war, Lee was called on to enforce provisions of the War Precautions Act 1914—namely the use of horses and other resources—recruit people with specialised administrative skills to both the Permanent Forces and the AIF, curb problems with drunkenness and ill-discipline among the soldiers in the state, and administer the housing and quarantine of returning soldiers amid the Spanish flu pandemic. He was promoted to the honorary rank of major general on 26 July 1918 and, after his retirement age was twice extended, he was placed on the Retired List with the honorary rank of lieutenant general on 13 May 1920.

== Later life and death ==
Lee was a long-term member of the Union Club in Sydney and was president of the United Service Club in Brisbane in 1912 and 1916.

Following his retirement from the army, Lee managed two oyster leases in Port Stephens, New South Wales. He died in Burwood, an Inner West suburb of Sydney, on 13 April 1939, aged 78. An 1896 watercolour of Lee is held by the Australian War Memorial, and the diary he maintained during his service in South Africa is in the collection of the Lancers' Museum, Parramatta.
