= Queensland National Bank, Gympie =

Queensland National Bank, Gymie
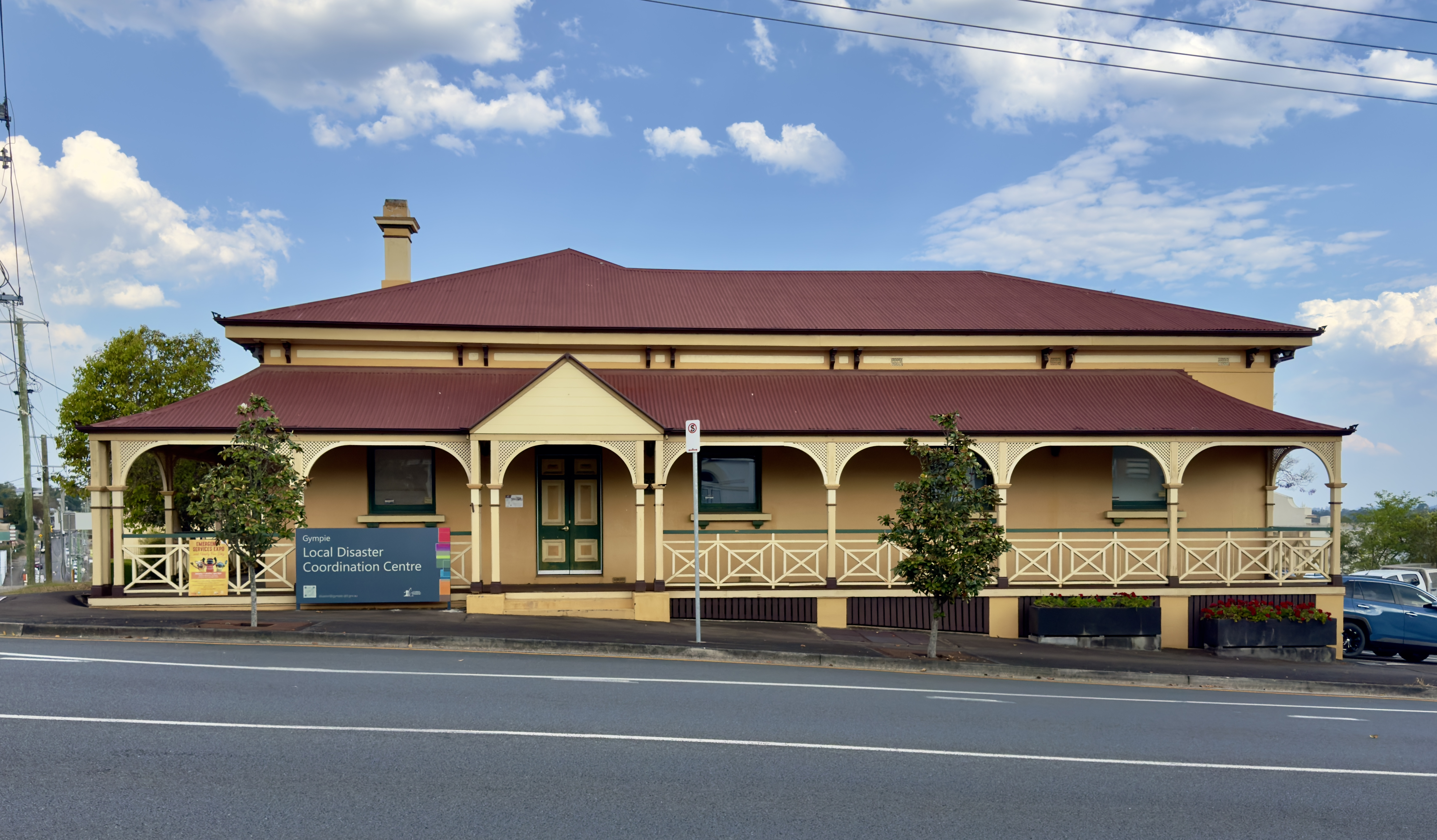
- Former Queensland National Bank, 2025

- Location within Queensland Location within Australia
- 26.1882°S 152.659°E
- Location: corner of Channon Street and Nash Streets, Gympie, Gympie Region, Queensland, Australia

History
- Design period: 1870s–1890s (late 19th century)
- Built: 1876–1877

Site notes
- Architect(s): John Richard Hall, Claude William Chambers

Queensland Heritage Register
- Official name: Queensland National Bank (former)
- Type: state heritage (built)
- Designated: 15 April 2011
- Reference no.: 602773
- Significant period: 1877–1930s
- Significant components: bank
- Builders: Andrew Collins

Queensland National Bank is a heritage-listed former bank and former town hall at the corner of Channon Street and Nash Streets, Gympie, Gympie Region, Queensland, Australia. It was designed by John Richard Hall and Claude William Chambers and built from 1876 to 1877 by Andrew Collins. It was added to the Queensland Heritage Register on 15 April 2011.

== History ==
This single-storey masonry former Queensland National Bank (QNB) and residence is located on the corner of Channon and Nash Streets, Gympie. It was designed by architect John Richard Hall in 1875 and opened in February 1877. Extensions designed by architect Claude Chambers were made in 1898. The bank served its original function until 1937.

Gympie (initially known as Nashville) was established after the discovery of gold in the Mary River district in October 1867. The new goldfield turned Queensland into a significant gold producer and contributed much needed finances to the young colony. Thousands of people arrived at the Gympie goldfield in the months after the discovery and a fledgling settlement emerged. In a year the alluvial gold had been exhausted and shallow reef mining commenced. With the change to deep reef mining from 1875, came the need for extensive capital investment through the formation of companies using foreign as well as local capital. During 1881, mines began yielding large amounts of gold, marking a new era of wealth and prosperity for Gympie as an intensive phase of underground reef mining began, facilitated by the injection of capital into mining companies for machinery and employees.

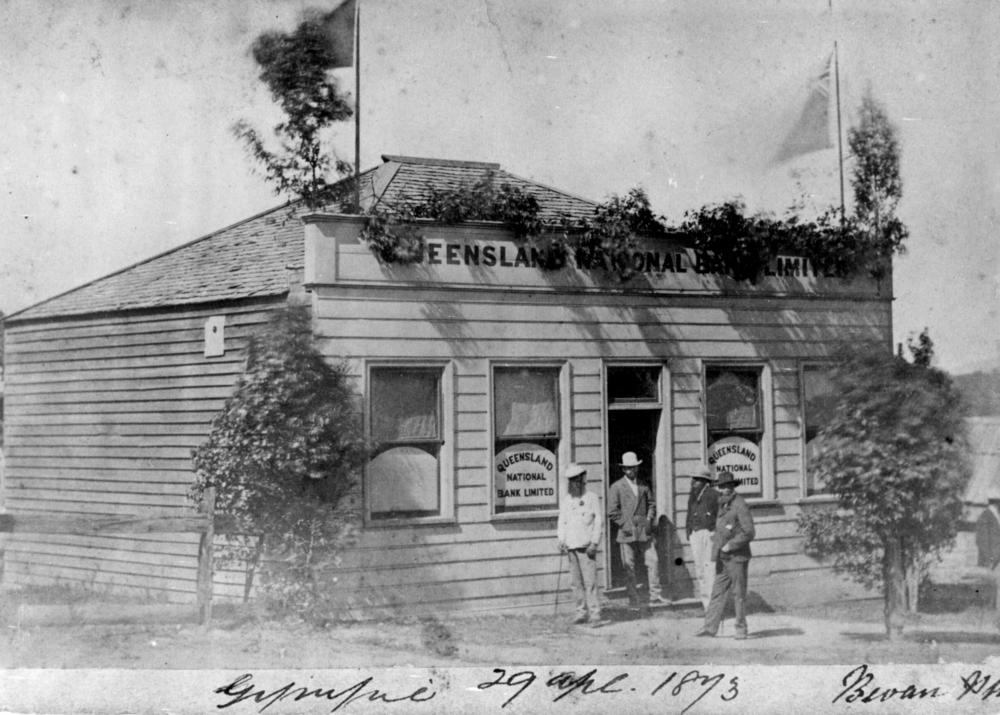
The first Queensland National Bank building in Gympie, 1873

As Gympie evolved from a hastily established mining settlement, it developed a distinctive character with an irregular street pattern amid a series of valleys and ridges. Consequently, many roads run along ridgelines (such as Channon Street) with linking roads across valleys and hillsides (as does Nash Street). Gradually the early makeshift structures of 1860s Gympie gave way to more permanent and substantial public and private buildings, including government buildings on Channon Street from the mid 1870s. A series of fires in Mary Street in 1877, 1881, 1891, 1929 and 1946 razed many of Gympie's early buildings, but left the QNB building untouched. Other extant early buildings are the former Gympie Court House and Lands Office (1876) and the first Masonic Hall in Duke Street (1869).

The Queensland National Bank was the first and most successful of Queensland's three indigenous 19th century banks. As the colony's most powerful banking institution, the QNB dominated the Queensland economy. It was established in March 1872 by an influential group of prominent Queensland squatters, politicians, lawyers, and businessmen who wished to secure development capital free from overseas or inter-colonial control. It commenced trading on 3 June 1872 at its first office in Brisbane. The bank attracted widespread Queensland patronage and branches opened in quick succession. By early in 1874 the bank had 10 branches. In 1878 the Queensland National Bank opened a branch in London, while one in Sydney opened two years later. In September 1879 Thomas McIlwraith (Queensland Premier 1877–83, 1888, 1893), a director of the QNB, persuaded Queensland Parliament to confer on it the whole of the Queensland Government's banking business. By 1880 the bank held 40% of the total deposits and advances in Queensland, a higher proportion than any other bank in any Australian colony. Despite financial scandals and a brief suspension of operation during the 1890s the bank exclusively held the government's account for 42 years, until 1921.

A branch of the Queensland National Bank opened in Gympie on 11 December 1872, within six months of the bank commencing operation. In its first 21 days of trading the Gympie branch purchased 6,095 ounces (172,800 g) of gold and in the first seven years of trading it handled 142,000 ounces (4,000,000 g) of gold. By 1890 the QNB had 14 branches on the Queensland mining fields. Charters Towers and Gympie were the premier mining branches transacting more than half of the bank's mining business. Their aggregate deposits and advances exceeded £0.5 million making them highly profitable branches.

Mainly due to Queensland's three major gold mining centres - Gympie, Charters Towers and Mount Morgan - gold production contributed between 21.61 and 35.53 percent of Queensland's export income during the 1880s and 1890s. The value of gold output rose from £698,000 in 1883 to £2.75 million in 1889, exceeding the value of exported wool. These enormous amounts of gold were purchased by banks such as the Queensland National Bank, which played a vital role in this process of wealth creation and distribution.

The architect for the Gympie branch of the Queensland National Bank and many of its other branches throughout the colony from 1872 was John Richard Hall (1835–83). Born and trained as an architect in England he migrated to the colonies by 1857. On 23 December 1859 Hall was appointed a foreman of works in the Queensland Colonial Architect's Office, but in the following May was made redundant. By 1864 Hall had begun private practice as an architect in Brisbane but little of his earliest work can be identified. From 1866 to 1872 he was Assessor for Brisbane's North Ward and in 1866 he was runner-up in a design competition for an engine house for the Citizens' Volunteer Fire Brigade. In 1868 he was appointed as a licensed surveyor in Queensland and took over superintending the outstanding work of Benjamin Backhouse, especially the completion of the Brisbane Grammar School (demolished 1911). As a private architect, Hall designed fine buildings throughout Queensland, including buildings for the Queensland National Bank; Maryborough Boys Grammar School (1881); residences including "Greylands", "Langlands" and 'Pahroombin'; commercial projects; churches; and hotels.

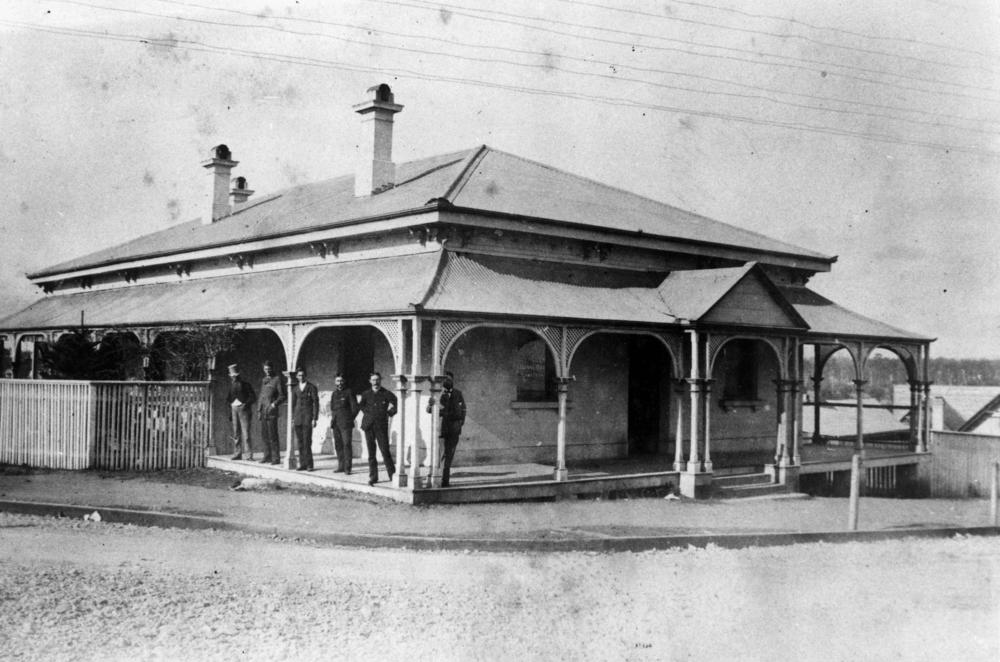
Bank personnel outside the Queensland National Bank, circa 1890

Hall designed the QNB's Gympie bank building in 1875 and construction took place in the following year, on the site of the bank's previous timber building, which was moved to the rear of the new building and used as part of the residence.

The task of supervising the building of the Gympie branch of the QNB and residence was undertaken by local Gympie architect Hugo Durietz. The new building was mainly of brick with stone foundations and the old timber premises were attached at the rear as part of the manager's residence. Andrew Collins was appointed as the builder after his tender of £1,500 was accepted. The total cost of the building, opened in February 1877, was £2,495/13/9.

In 1898 alterations to the Queensland National Bank building in Gympie were made by architect Claude William Chambers. These widened the bank on the western side of the Channon Street elevation to accommodate the accountant, clerks and a strong room. A site plan shows the extended bank building and the location of its outbuildings on the large block of land in relation to the building. The stables and buggy shed with feed room were located along Nash Street 65 feet (20 m) from the nearest point of the building. A water closet was located 42 feet (13 m) from the nearest point of the building to the south-east of the residence and a second lavatory was located 19 feet (5.8 m) to the south-west of the bank building along Channon Street.

Architect C W Chambers (1861–1947) was born and educated in Melbourne and worked in both Melbourne and Sydney before coming to Brisbane in November 1885 to work for FDG Stanley. He assisted with the plans for St Paul's Presbyterian Church, Robert Harper and Co.'s mills and D L Brown and Co.'s new warehouse in Brisbane; was honorary architect to the Brisbane gymnasium and in 1885 was instrumental in founding the Queensland Institute of Architects. In March 1889 Chambers joined the Sydney architects A L & G McCredie as their Brisbane partner, forming McCredie Bros and Chambers. He supervised the firm's new AUSN offices (Naldham House) and in December 1889 produced the firm's winning entry in a design competition for Brisbane's Trades and Labour Hall. After the partnership ended on 1 February 1893, Chambers practised in his own right as an architect and consulting engineer in Brisbane and supervised the Burns, Philp and Co Offices in Townsville for the McCredie Brothers architects.

His practice was one of Brisbane's largest in the early 20th century. His major works include "Drysllwyn" (later 'Raymont Lodge') home of Gympie magnate, William Davies; "Ross Roy", Indooroopilly; additions to the Commercial Travellers Association Club, Elizabeth Street (1898); "The Big Block" for Finney Isles, Queen Street (1908–10) and Perry House, corner of Albert and Elizabeth Streets, (1910–13). After entering partnership with Lange Powell in 1911 as Chambers and Powell, he moved to Sydney in 1915. From 1920 to 1935 Chambers formed another Brisbane partnership with E M Ford as Chambers and Ford and practised in Sydney from 1931 to 1934 with a pioneer woman architect from Queensland, Beatrice May Hutton (1893–1990).

After the turn of the century the town's key function changed from gold mining to service town for the surrounding dairy and fruit- growing district. Accordingly, the QNB turned to commerce and agriculture to provide the Gympie branch's business. Over time the commercial centre of the town moved eastward down Mary Street in response to commercial activity centering upon the railway station. As a result, the QNB Board sanctioned the purchase of premises at the corner of Mary and Monkland Streets in 1937 for its operations and approved the sale of the Channon Street bank premises. In the following year it was sold. The building was used by industrial service businesses until its purchase by the Widgee Shire Council in 1990.

Restoration of the former Queensland National Bank building by the Widgee Shire Council took place in 2000 after the shire council received funding under the Federation Community Projects Program for restoration of the building. The project was described as "architecturally sensitive restoration works on a culturally significant building". The work included reinstatement of the front and side verandahs that had been removed decades previously; repairs to the rear verandah, flooring, stumps, joists, windows, plaster and roof; repair and upgrading of electrical and plumbing installations and toilet facilities; polishing selected floors and laying floor coverings; and painting the building internally and externally.

The former Queensland National Bank building served as Widgee Shire Council chambers (later the Cooloola Shire Council chambers) for a number of years, but, after the shire was amalgamated into the Gympie Region in 2008, the building was used as office space by the Gympie Regional Council.

== Description ==
The former Queensland National Bank, a single storey rendered masonry building, stands to the corner of Channon and Nash Streets, Gympie.

Sheltered by a hipped roof clad with corrugated metal sheeting the building, at street level to the north corner, is supported on concrete stumps and stone retaining walls accommodating the slope of the site south and southwest down to Mary Street. Three rendered masonry chimney stacks rise from rooms on the eastern side. Decorative paired timber roof brackets interspersed with rectangular moulded concrete indents run around the building under the main roof. A reconstructed timber floored verandah runs around the northeast and northwest sides, sheltered by a concave roof clad with corrugated metal sheeting.

The main elevation faces northwest onto Channon Street and is asymmetrical about the main entrance which is marked by the projecting gable roof entrance within the concave verandah roof. The elevation is punctuated by large full pane sash windows one to the east and three to the west of the entrance, a two leaf timber door with an arched fixed light fanlight over. Plain painted concrete sills with stark moulded brackets project beneath the windows.

The northeast elevation to Nash Street is punctuated by a run of openings - a set of French windows and entrance to the former residence to the south end and a line of four large sash windows to the north matching those of the main elevation. The blank southwest elevation is partly obscured by the recent small hipped roof, weatherboard clad extension accommodating an entry porch and toilets. The southeast elevation accommodates two large sash windows with concrete sills and is supported on a random course stone wall base.

L-shaped in plan, the building accommodates the former bank in the northwest wing and the former manager's residence in the southeast wing. The bank wing is rectangular in plan and accommodates the banking chamber, accountant/clerks' office, strong room, manager's office and stationery room. Entered from the main entrance on Channon Street, the banking chamber is distinguished by a decorative pressed metal ceiling and cornice. Two flattened archways with prominent decorative keystones to the southwest mark the extent of the 1876 chamber beyond which is the accountant and clerks area also defined by a pressed metal ceiling and cornice matching that in the main banking chamber. A strong room stands to the southern corner of this space. The heavy metal door to the strong room has a maker's mark – John N Tann's Reliance Door – stamped on the front.

The former manager's office stands to the northern corner of the building and opens into the banking chamber to the southwest and the stationery room to the southeast which in turn opens to the former residence behind. The manager's office is notable for a fine decorative pressed metal ceiling and accommodates a fireplace with a decorative timber surround.

Square in plan, the core of the residence survives to the southeast of the bank. Four rooms are organised off a central hall which narrows halfway along. The main entrance to Nash Street is a four-panel timber door with sidelights and fanlights. Both front rooms have fireplaces with carved timber surrounds. Ceilings throughout the residence are plastered and plain with no cornices. The remnant of a gas light fitting remains in the room to the northwest of the entrance hall. Recent reconstruction and renovation work includes new door and window joinery and light fittings, however, original skirtings, architraves, fanlights, and door and window joinery and hardware survive. A pine floor runs throughout, polished in some areas and covered with carpet in others.

A bitumened carpark stands to the southwest and southeast of the building. The shed to the south-east on Lot 1 is not considered to be of cultural heritage significance.

== Heritage listing ==
The former Queensland National Bank was listed on the Queensland Heritage Register on 15 April 2011 having satisfied the following criteria.

The place is important in demonstrating the evolution or pattern of Queensland's history.

The former Queensland National Bank (QNB) building (1877)-and the important gold-era precinct of which it is a part-is physical evidence of the vital role of financial institutions in the process of wealth creation and distribution on Queensland goldfields as it converted enormous amounts of gold into cash. Gympie's gold was a major contributor to the wealth of Queensland for approximately 60 years from 1867.

The former QNB building is set apart from other bank buildings also in the Queensland Heritage Register (e.g. Royal Bank of Queensland) in being one of the permanent commercial buildings that resulted from the success of shallow reef mining, an early phase of gold mining in the town of Gympie, and the expectation of further gold discovery through deep reef mining. For 60 years the building served as a Queensland National Bank branch and manager's residence. It is one of only a few known 1870s commercial buildings remaining in Gympie.

The siting of the QNB building on Commissioners Hill and its later sale when the centre of the town moved eastwards after gold production ceased also illustrate the evolution of Gympie's development.

The place is important in demonstrating the principal characteristics of a particular class of cultural places.

The former QNB building is important in demonstrating the principal characteristics of a regional bank of its era, being a good example of a masonry structure combining a banking chamber, office and manager's residence. Its siting with other important institutions like the Lands Office and Courthouse on Commissioner's Hill, high above the gold diggings, illustrates the prominence of banks in the gold mining town of Gympie.

The former QNB building is the oldest extant bank building in Gympie and the only one dating from the 1870s.

Its intactness is demonstrated in its planning, room volumes, joinery, strongroom and pressed metal ceilings.

The place is important because of its aesthetic significance.

Sited on one of Gympie's high points in the vicinity of important government buildings such as the former Lands Office and Courthouse, the former QNB building is symbolic of the importance and permanence of the bank in one of the most economically important towns in Queensland. Along with a number of other bank buildings, including the former Bank of New South Wales (Bank of New South Wales, Gympie), the QNB building contributes to an important and substantially intact gold-era precinct in upper Mary Street area of Gympie.

The building has aesthetic significance for its architectural qualities expressed in the craftsmanship and detailing of the joinery and finishes, and for its streetscape value through its form, scale and design which complement other surviving 19th century buildings in its vicinity.

The place has a special association with the life or work of a particular person, group or organisation of importance in Queensland's history.

The former QNB building, operating as a QNB branch from February 1877 until 1937, has a special association with the Queensland National Bank. As one of its earliest and most profitable branches, the Gympie branch of the QNB was important in the QNB's growth in Queensland. By 1880 the QNB held 40% of the total deposits and advances in Queensland, a higher proportion than any other bank in any Australian colony. The bank also exclusively held the Queensland government's account for 42 years (1879–1921). As the colony's most powerful banking institution, the QNB dominated Queensland's economy during the last quarter of the 19th century.
