= Laing's Nek =

Pass through the Drakensberg mountains in KwaZulu Natal province, South Africa

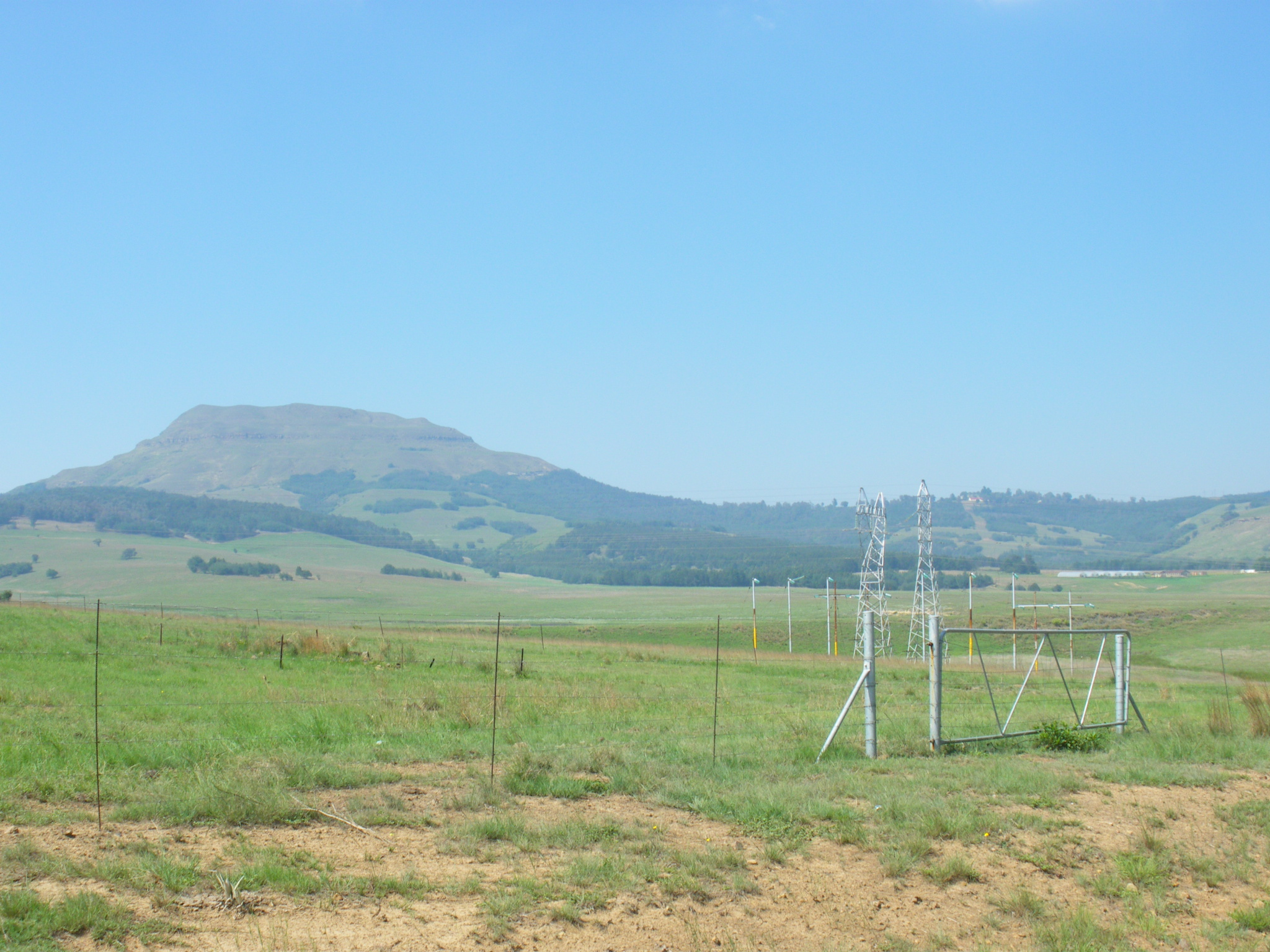
- Majuba Hill from Laing's Nek
- Interactive map of Laing's Nek
- Elevation: 1,680 m (5,510 ft)
- Traversed by: N11

Third Approach
- Location: KwaZulu Natal, South Africa
- Range: Drakensberg

Laing's Nek, or Lang's Nek is a pass through the Drakensberg mountain range in South Africa, south of Charlestown, at 27°27′39″S 29°52′10″E at an elevation of 5400 to 6,000 ft (1,800 m). It is the lowest part of a ridge that slopes from Majuba Hill east to the Buffalo River. Before the opening of the railway in 1891, the road over the nek was the main artery of communication between Durban and Pretoria. The railway crosses the pass via a 2,213 ft (675 m) tunnel.

== History ==
There are two possible explanations for its name. It could be named after Henry Laing, owner of a farm at its foot, or after William Timothy Lang, who bought a farm in 1874 at its base.

When the Boers rose in revolt in December 1880, they occupied Laing's Nek to oppose the entry of British reinforcements into the Transvaal. On 28 January 1881, a small British force endeavoured to drive the Boers from the pass but was forced to retire after the Battle of Laing's Nek. During the Second Boer War, the Boers once again fortified this position in order to prevent General Buller from crossing into Transvaal. At Battle of Laing’s Nek, the British fought the Boers from 2–10 June, eventually forcing the Boers from the position.
