= Battle of Zand River =

Battle during the Second Boer War on May 10, 1900

Coordinates: 28°10′14.6″S 27°2′7.3″E

- Part of the Advance on Pretoria
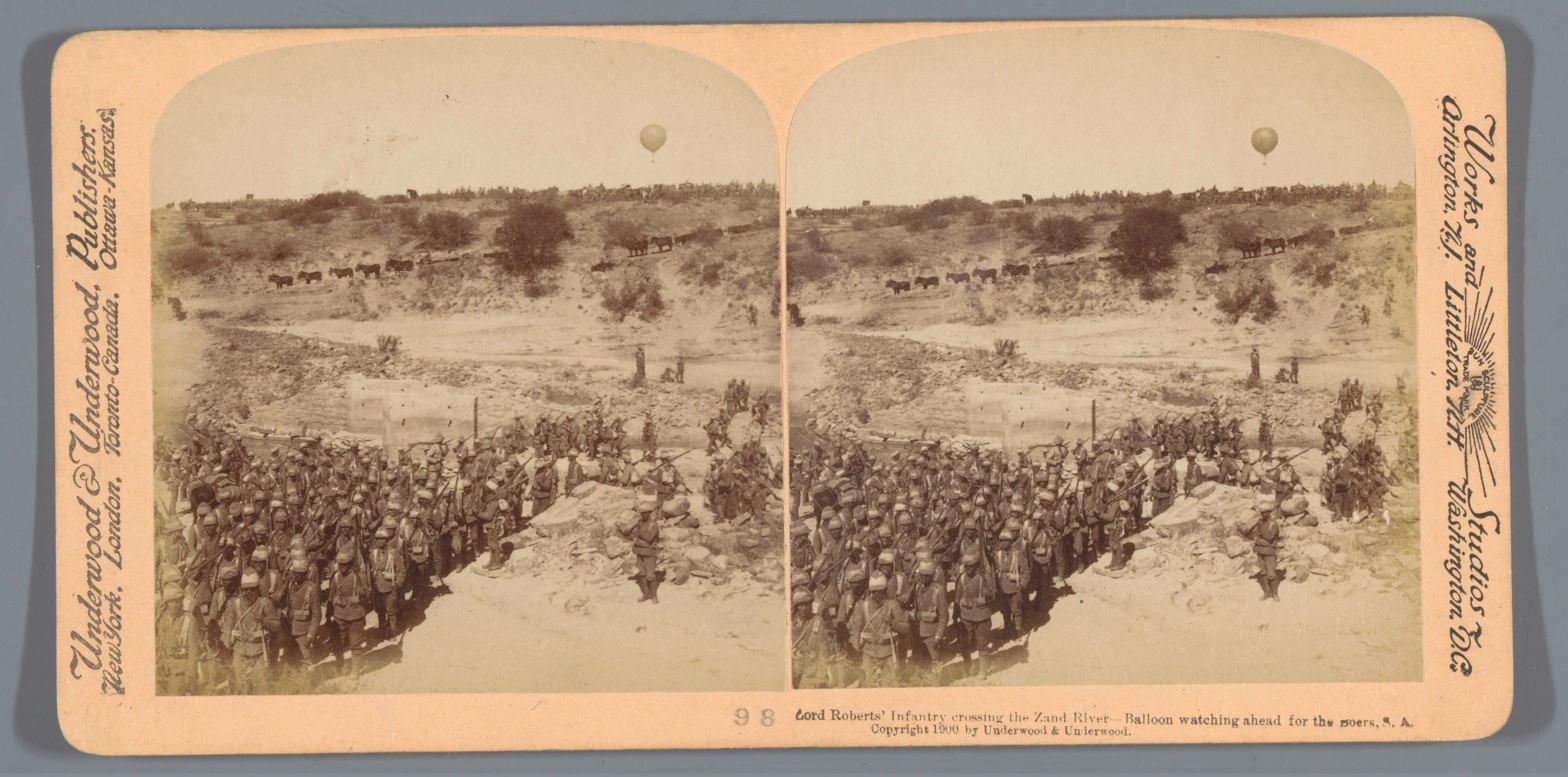
- British troops crossing the Zand River
Date	10 May 1900
Location	Sand River, South Africa
Result	British victory

Belligerents
United Kingdom; Canada	South African Republic; Orange Free State

Commanders and leaders
(United Kingdom) Frederick Roberts (United Kingdom) John French (United Kingdom) Ian Hamilton (United Kingdom) Reginald Pole-Carew (United Kingdom) Charles Tucker	(South African Republic) Louis Botha

Strength
11,000	~800 Boers

Casualties and losses
250 officers and men	

The Battle of Zand River, also known as the Battle of Sand River was an engagement between the British forces under Lord Roberts that faced a Boer defensive position, led by Louis Botha. The Boers had set up defensive positions at the river, extending around 20 miles, in order to prevent the British from advancing on Kroonstad and Pretoria.

== Background ==
Since February 1900, the Boers had been on the defensive in the Orange Free State. After the Battle of Paardeberg saw Piet Cronje's army surrender, Lord Roberts began the March on Bloemfontein. The march saw the British move west from Kimberley, following the course of the Modder River towards the capital. On 13 March, the operation concluded, and the British occupied Bloemfontein. From there, he decided to clear the south east of the Orange Free State, halting the advance for six weeks.

The main army stayed at Bloemfontein, with the 7th Division entrenched at Karee Siding, a position 20 miles north of the city. Forces led by Ian Hamilton and John French hunted Boer commandos in the south, composing of mostly colonial and cavalry units. Through March, April, and early May, the British cleared the region of hostile commandos, mostly led by Christiaan de Wet. By the beginning of May, the clearing of the south east Orange Free State had been complete, and so Lord Roberts decided to move his army north towards Pretoria.

On 1 May, Ian Hamilton moved out from Winburg, and The main body of infantry, under Lord Roberts which was composed of the 11th Division, 7th Division, French's Cavalry, the 6th Division, and the 3rd Division, moved from Bloemfontein on 3 May towards Karee, and then began moving north on 6 May.

== Battle ==
The Boers, being forced from the southern Free State, moved north to join the other commandos, entrenching themselves at the Sand River to prevent the British from advancing further up the railway lines. By 6 May, the British had advanced north from Bloemfontein, and began their advance on Transvaal. About 130km north of Bloemfontein, they came across a Boer defensive position at Sand (or Zand) River. The Boers had blown up the railway bridge, forcing the British to ford the Sand River. The Boers had overextended their defense line, going at about 20 miles.

On the morning of May 10th, the British began the engagement, and prepared to cross the Sand River. General French began moving his cavalry onto the left flank, and engaged the Boers. His cavalry pushed northwards, and was considerably closer to Ventersburg Siding than before. General Broadwood led his cavalry up the center right along the railway, and engaged the Boer rear. He had made it much closer to Ventersburg than French. The infantry began crossing in the center, with Lord Roberts advancing center left, and Ian Hamilton advancing center right.

The Seventh Division crossed the river, and the Boers opened fire as they did so. Once the Seventh Crossed, the Sussex regiment stormed an important kopje with minimal casualties. British Infantry and artillery pounded the ridges, and by noon, they had taken the ridges. Cavalry then attempted to head towards Ventersburg Siding, however they ran across a strong Boer rear position, and was repulsed even after French's reinforcements arrived. The Boers then attempted a counter-attack from the rear right flank, however mounted infantry repulsed them. By evening, the Boers had retreated northwards, and the British continued their advance on May 11.

=== British units present ===
11th Division - Reginald Pole-Carew
Infantry Units	Mounted Units
Coldstream Guards	Life Guards
Grenadier Guards	
Warwickshire Reg.	
Essex Reg.	
Welch Reg.	
Yorkshire Reg.	
7th Division - Charles Tucker
Infantry Battalions	Mounted Units
Norfolk Reg.	Ceylon Mounted Infantry
Lincolnshire Reg.	
Hampshire Reg.	
Scottish Borderers	
North Staffordshire Reg.	
Cheshire Reg.	
East Lancashire Reg.	
South Wales Borderers	
Bruce Hamilton's Brigade
Infantry Battalions	Mounted Units
Derbyshire Reg.	
Sussex Reg.	
Cameron Highlanders	
C.I.V	
Ian Hamilton's Brigade
Infantry Battalions	Mounted Units
Gordon Highlanders	
Royal Canadian Regiment	
Shropshire L.I Reg.	
Cornwall Reg.	

== Aftermath ==
After the battle, the Boers retreated-

== Maps of the Battle ==
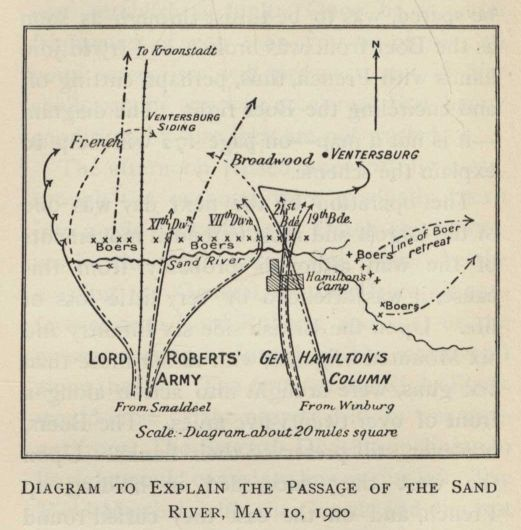
Full map of the crossing and battle

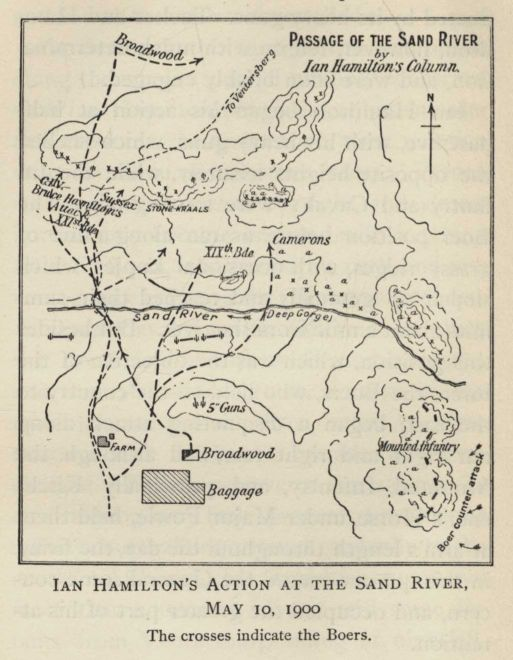
Ian Hamilton and General Broadwood's operations at Zand River
