= Battle of Doornkop =

1900 battle of the Second Boer War

- Part of Second Boer War
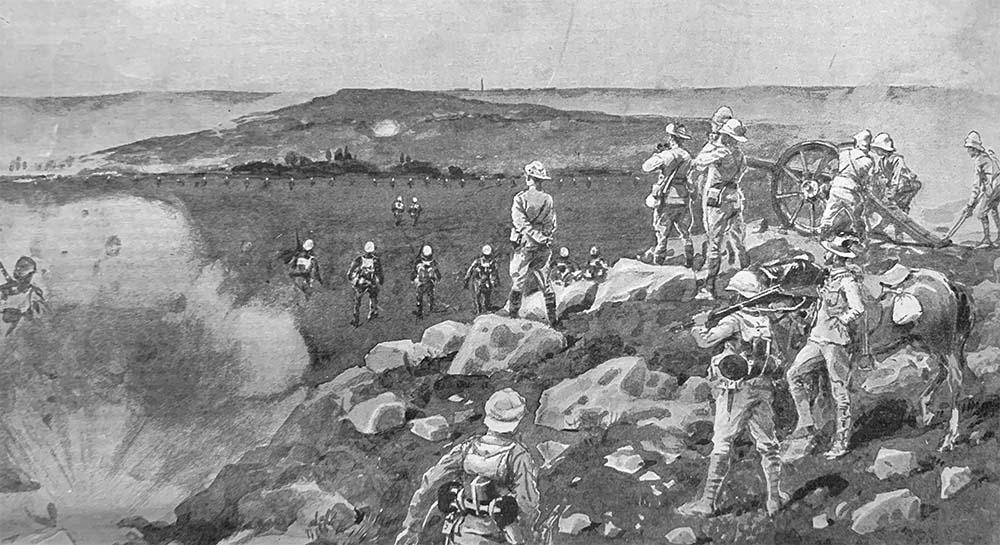
- Battle of Doornkop
Date	28–30 May 1900
Location	Doornkop, Transvaal, South Africa
Result	British victory

Belligerents
United Kingdom; Canada	South African Republic

Commanders and leaders
(United Kingdom) Frederick Roberts (United Kingdom) John French (United Kingdom) Ian Hamilton	(South African Republic) Louis Botha (Orange Free State) Koos de la Rey

Strength
5,000+	2,000+

Casualties and losses
130 killed, wounded and captured	No definitive numbers

The Battle of Doornkop was fought during Lord Roberts' advance on Pretoria in May and June 1900.

== Background ==
Following his victory against the Boers at the Battle of Paardeberg, Roberts moved to take the capital cities of Johannesburg and Pretoria, hoping to force the Boers to surrender. By late May 1900, the British army was nearing Johannesburg but across the army's route lay the formidable Klipriversberg Range. In its midst was the position of Doornkop, which the Boers had occupied in force.

Doornkop is a ridge on the western boundary of Johannesburg, and much of the area covered by the British advance is now the suburban expanses of Roodepoort and Soweto. However, it played a significant part in the history of Johannesburg in that it was here in January 1896 that the Jameson Raid was halted, and some four years later the last battle in the surrender of Johannesburg was fought.

Roberts's advance on Johannesburg was two pronged. The columns under Lieutenant-General French and Lieutenant-General Hamilton were to advance to the west of Johannesburg, with the main force under the command of Major-General Tucker and Major-General Pole-Carew making its way along the railway line, to the east of Johannesburg.

== Battle ==
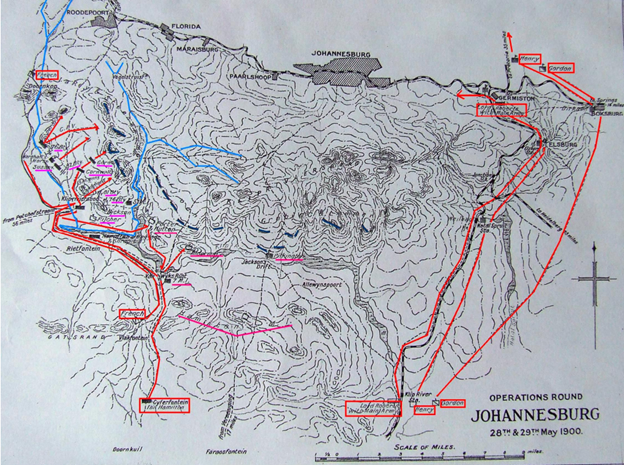
Map of operations around Johannesburg, 1900

On 28 May, having just crossed the Klip River, French's column met unexpected resistance from a heavy bombardment from the Boers. His advance was temporarily halted and he withdrew to re-group. Hamilton by this stage, with his column, was close behind French, and he moved further west to commence a flanking movement. Together with the force of over 20 000, the British had over 30 guns bombarding the Boers defensive position. In addition to their heavy artillery, the Boers had the Long Tom Gun which had been in action at Mafeking.

On the morning of 29 May, French made no progress with his cavalry and mounted infantry under the continued barrage of Boer gunfire. Boer General, Ben Viljoen writes in his memoirs that "the British now marched on Doornkop, their real object of attack being our extreme right wing. Our line of defence was very extended and weakened by the removal of a body of men who had been sent to stop the other body of enemy from forcing its way along the railway line and cutting off our retreat to Pretoria."

The Imperial Yeomanry comprised part of the British forces at Doornkop, including the 7th Battalion which included companies of the Dorset Yeomanry and North Somerset Yeomanry. When Hamilton was positioned, French withdrew and Hamilton commenced with his full frontal attack on Doornkop with two infantry brigades. The Gordon Highlanders were right in front. With the advance of the British, the Boers set fire to the veld. The regimental history of the Gordon Highlanders states – "The leading battalion of the 19th Brigade were the Gordon's, there was no chance for selection. Their extension and advance were conducted with machine like regularity. The grass in front of them was burnt and burning, and against this dark background the kakhi figures showed distinctly. The Boers held their fire until the attack was within 800 yards, and then, louder than the cannonade, the ominous rattle of concentrated rifle-fire burst forth." Lachlan Gordon-Duff in his memoirs wrote, "... within 400 yards, the Boers were behind a lot of rocks and had burnt away all the grass. The fire was now very heavy and men were falling and the only thing to do was charge."

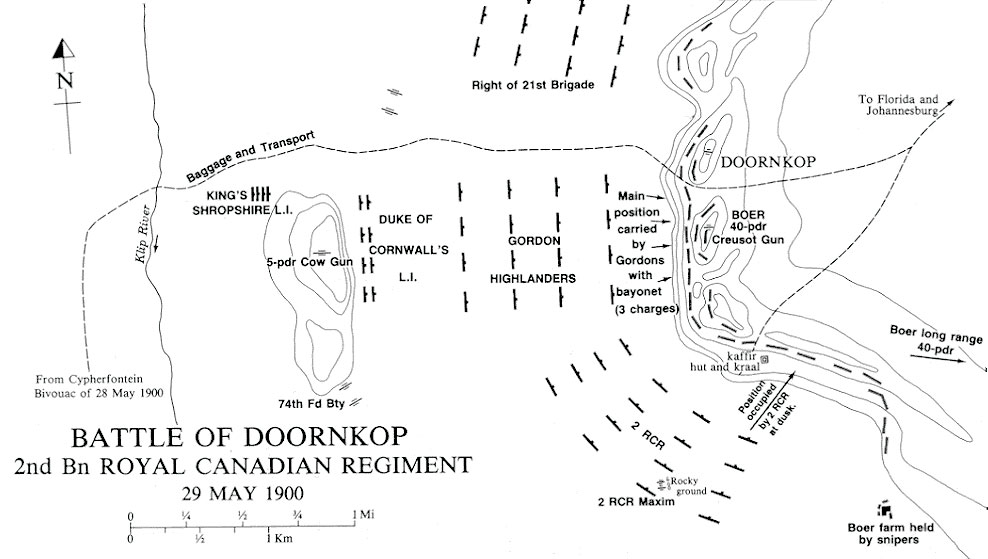
Map of the Battle of Doornkop, May 29

Two Canadian units remained temporarily behind to draw Boer fire and deflect the enemy's attention from the flanking manoeuvre taking place south of the river. After enduring about three hours of heavy Boer fire, the Canadian Mounted Rifles finally galloped back across the river, followed soon thereafter by the Royal Canadian Dragoons. The two units had played a vital part in the battle, and suffered only light casualties. The cavalry succeeded in seizing a new crossing of the river to the west, but it was still be up to the infantry, including the 2nd Battalion, Royal Canadian Regiment of Infantry, to advance and attack Doornkop.

As part of the general attack, the Canadian infantry moved forward over a low ridge and up a long slope, under fire the whole way. The Boers had set fire to the brush and for part of the distance the troops had to run through flames, while the smoke made navigation and control difficult. By clever use of the ground, aided by the aggressive support of the battalion machine gun section, the Canadians captured their objective with losses of only seven men wounded.

== Aftermath ==
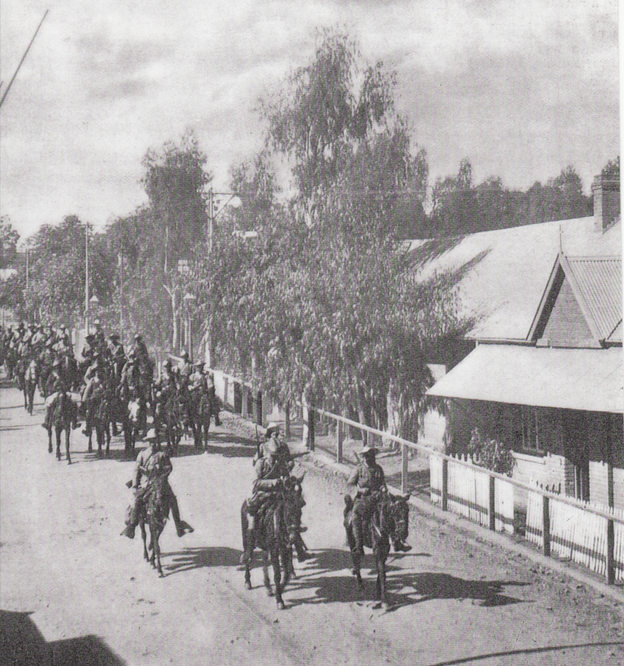
Dorset Yeomanry entering Johannesburg, May 1900

The Regimental records of the C.I.V. and the Canadians both report that the casualties to the Gordon's were heavy, with the C.I.V. reporting that 12 of their men were wounded, and the Canadians had seven wounded. Thomas Packenham records that the Gordon's lost 100 men in 10 minutes. Regimental history records that "Captain Meyrick and 19 men were killed, with 78 men wounded". Gordon-Duff recorded that "... our dead and wounded numbered 97. Later, 15 or 16 died of wounds and another four or five died of wounds in hospital."

Reports in the Morning Post in the UK relating to the battle, and more specifically to the Gordon Highlanders (attributed to Winston Churchill) were – "I think, the finest performance I have seen in the whole campaign", and "There is no doubt they [Gordons] are the finest regiment in the world."

One Victoria Cross was awarded for the battle – to Corporal F. Mackay, for conspicuous bravery in dressing the wounds of comrades and carrying one man some distance under heavy fire.

The British continued to drive the Boers from the area and on 31 May they captured and entered Johannesburg, and then Pretoria on 5 June. Although their capitals were under British occupation and the government driven from power, the Boers in the field did not surrender and continued to fight the British forces, waging a guerilla war for almost two years.
