= Battle of Laing's Nek (1900) =

Battle of the Second Boer War

- Part of the Advance on Pretoria of the Second Boer War
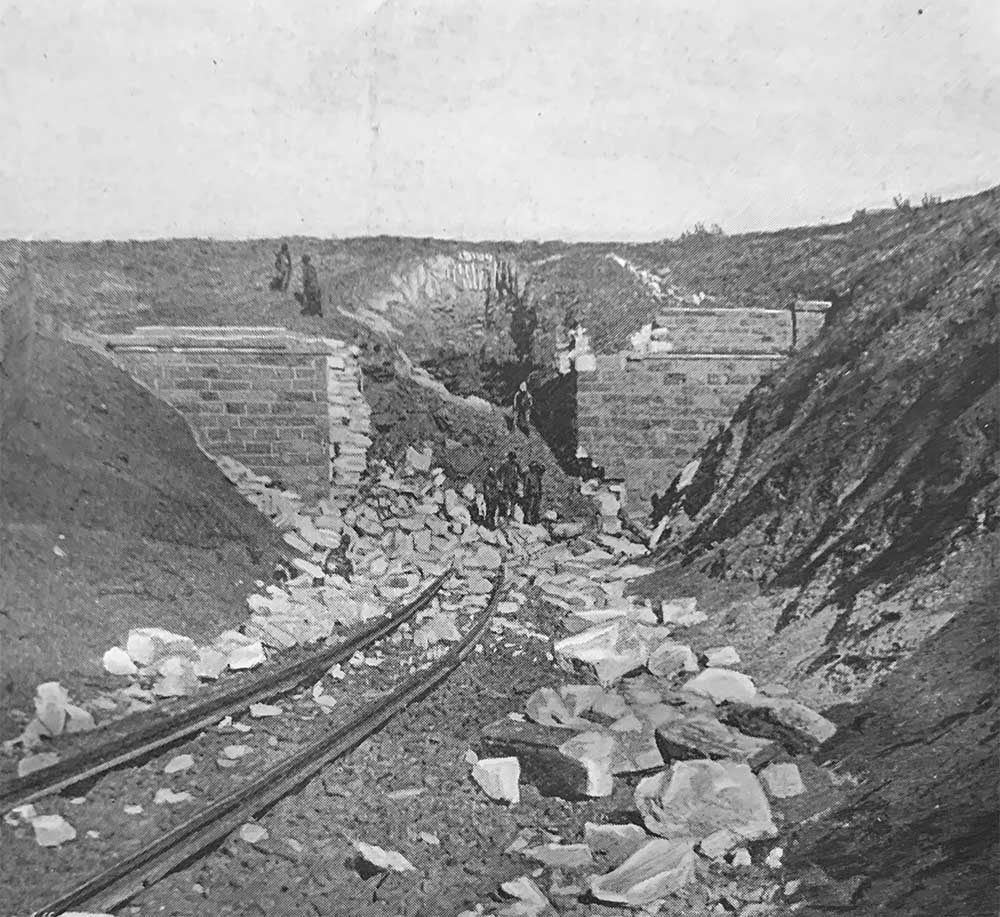
- The railway tunnel at Laing's Nek, destroyed by the Boers to impede the advancing British.
Date	2–10 June 1900
Location	Laing's Nek, South Africa
Result	British victory

Belligerents
United Kingdom	South African Republic

Commanders and leaders
(United Kingdom) Redvers Buller	(South African Republic) Christiaan Botha

Casualties and losses
66 Casualties	

The Battle of Laing's Nek from 2–10 June 1900 was a series of actions in the Second Boer War between forces under Redvers Buller and the Boers of the Transvaal. At the time, Redvers Buller was advancing from Ladysmith to the Buffalo River, in an effort to cross into Volskrust, where he could then aid Lord Roberts in the Advance on Pretoria. The Boers had fortified themselves at Laing's Nek, as they had done previously 18 years prior. Over the course of eight days, Buller was able to repulse the Boers, and cross the Buffalo River into Transvaal on 12 June.
