= Advance on Pretoria =

Military operation of the Second Boer War

- Part of the Second Boer War
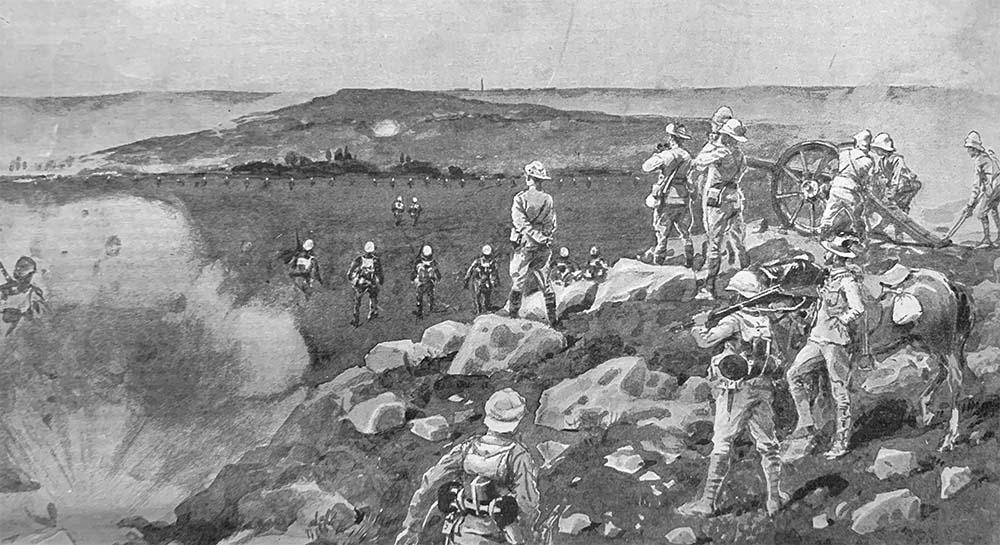
- The Battle of Doornkop, a major battle of the Advance on Pretoria
Date	3 May – 8 June 1900
Location	Orange Free State and Transvaal
Result	British Victory

Belligerents
British Empire: United Kingdom; Canada; New Zealand; Queensland; Victoria; Western Australia; South Australia; Tasmania; New South Wales; Ceylon	South African Republic Orange Free State

Commanders and leaders
(United Kingdom) Lord Roberts (United Kingdom) John French (United Kingdom) Redvers Buller (United Kingdom) Lord Methuen (United Kingdom) Charles Tucker (United Kingdom) Ian Hamilton (United Kingdom) Thomas Kelly-Kenny (United Kingdom) Reginald Pole-Carew	(South African Republic) Louis Botha (South African Republic) Paul Kruger (South African Republic) Koos de la Rey (Orange Free State) Christiaan de Wet

The Advance on Pretoria was a military operation during the Second Boer War. From May–June 1900, Lord Roberts and his force began a strategic offensive from Bloemfontein to Pretoria, with the goal of capturing Pretoria, the capital of the South African Republic (Transvaal) in hopes of ending the war, and forcing the Boers into surrendering. After the clearing of the South East of the Orange Free State, Lord Roberts began his offensive on 3 May 1900, gathering a force around 40,000-50,000 strong. The Army formed three lines of advance. On the far left, a force commanded by Lord Methuen advanced from Boshof, in the center, Lord Roberts led the main army up the railway from Bloemfontein to Pretoria, and on the right, Redvers Buller led an army up through Northern Natal from Ladysmith to Pretoria. The military operation was a success, with British Forces entering Pretoria on 5 June, and the Boers surrendering the capital shortly after. On 8 June, the country was annexed, and formed into the Transvaal Colony in 1902. Methuen managed to clear the Orange Free State, and had a force relieve Mafeking whilst doing so.

== Background ==
Since February 1900, the Boers had been on the defensive in the Orange Free State. After the Battle of Paardeberg saw Piet Cronje's army surrender, Lord Roberts began the March on Bloemfontein. The march saw the British move west from Kimberley, following the course of the Modder River towards the capital. On 13 March, the operation concluded, and the British occupied Bloemfontein. From there, he decided to clear the south east of the Orange Free State, halting the advance for six weeks.

The main army stayed at Bloemfontein, with the 7th Division entrenched at Karee Siding, a position 20 miles north of the city. Forces led by Ian Hamilton and John French hunted Boer commandos in the south, composing of mostly colonial and cavalry units. Through March, April, and early May, the British cleared the region of hostile commandos, mostly led by Christiaan de Wet. By the beginning of May, the clearing of the south east Orange Free State had been complete, and so Lord Roberts decided to move his army north towards Pretoria.

== Main Advance by Lord Roberts ==
The main Advance from Bloemfontein began on 1 May. Ian Hamilton moved out from Winburg, and the main body of infantry, under Lord Roberts, which was composed of the 11th Division, 7th Division, French's Cavalry, the 6th Division, and the 3rd Division, moved from Bloemfontein on 3 May towards Karee, and then began moving north on 6 May. His force advanced mainly up the railway lines, with cavalry and mounted rifles being placed on the fringes, and the infantry being in the center. Resistance was encountered on 10 May, where the British Forces found that the railway bridge at Sand River had been blown up. A Boer defensive position was discovered nearby. At the Battle of Zand River, a force of cavalry led by General French, along with a force of infantry, forced the Boers from their position. Roberts resumed the advance, with the Boers stationed north of them at Kroonstad, the new capital of the O.F.S. However, on 12 May, Roberts' forced marched into the town without resistance, and the Boer leaders in control had fled. Roberts' force halted here for 8 days to recuperate, before continuing on 20 May. On 21 May, Roberts occupied Ladybrand, and crossed the Vaal River on the 26 May, officially entering the Transvaal. On 28 May, the troops passed Klip River with no resistance. On 29 May, the force encountered resistance at Doornkop. In the following Battle, lasting into the next day, the British repulsed the Boer forces present, and Louis Botha was forced to withdraw again. On 31 May, British troops occupied Johannesburg, beginning the last stage of the advance.

British cavalry blew up the railway line from Deloga to Pretoria, and quickly began moving in to surround the enemy capitol. On 2 June, Roberts' force moved out, expecting resistance from the Pretoria Forts, however none such resistance came, and by 4 June, all fighting and skirmishing ceased. On 5 June, the Coldstream Guards marched into Pretoria unopposed, and the capitol was surrendered to the British.

== Buller's advances in Natal ==
Whilst Lord Roberts was advancing from Bloemfontein, General Buller was busy clearing Northern Natal, which was still laden with Boers, even after the Siege of Ladysmith had ended in February. He had advanced from Ladysmith to Newcastle, and by May 1900, had cleared most of Natal of the Boers. The final and most major actions were the Battle of Laing's Nek, and the Battle of Botha's Pass in June 1900. Eventually, Buller was able to repulse the Boers, and push into the Transvaal, crossing the border on June 12, 1900.
