= Telecommunications House =

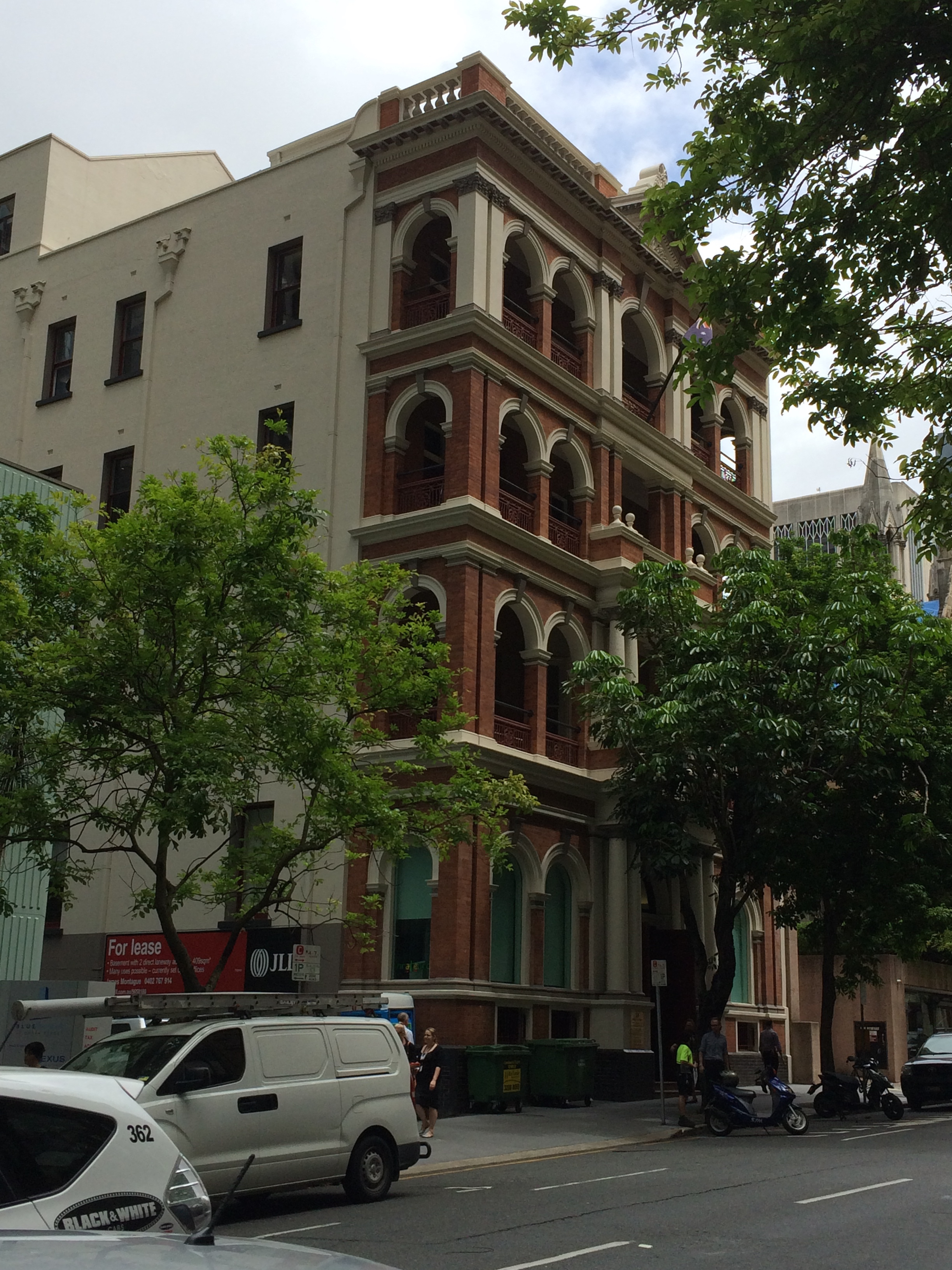
- Corbett Chambers, 2015

- Location within Queensland Location within Australia
- 27.4683°S 153.0292°E
- Location: 283 Elizabeth Street, Brisbane City, City of Brisbane, Queensland, Australia

History
- Design period: 1900–1914 (early 20th century)
- Built: 1906–1907, extended c. 1914
- Built for: Commercial Travellers Association of Queensland

Site notes
- Architect: Claude William Chambers
- Architectural style: Classicism

Queensland Heritage Register
- Official name: Telecommunications House (former)
- Type: state heritage (built)
- Designated: 5 April 2004
- Reference no.: 600110
- Significant period: 1906–1907, c. 1914 (fabric); 1907–1963, 1963–1991 (historical)

Telecommunications House is a heritage-listed former clubhouse and now office building at 283 Elizabeth Street, Brisbane City, City of Brisbane, Queensland, Australia. It is also known as Corbett Chambers. It was designed by Claude William Chambers and built from 1906 to 1909 and was further extended c. 1914. It was added to the Queensland Heritage Register on 5 April 2004.

== History ==
This building was erected in 1906–1907 as headquarters and clubrooms for the Commercial Travellers Association (CTA) of Queensland.

The Commercial Travellers Association of Queensland was formed in 1884. It was the fourth such organisation started in Australia, the first being in Adelaide in the 1870s. Commercial travellers were an integral part of the retailing process in early Queensland. Most businesses employed them. They travelled all over the colony, showing samples of goods to retailers in isolated towns and conveying orders to the suppliers. They saw themselves as "advance agents", spreading "the blessings and decencies of civilization".

Since its inception, the CTA had met in hotels, but between 1904 and 1906 the association acquired property in Elizabeth Street for a purpose-built headquarters and club rooms. The building was designed by prominent Brisbane architect Claude William Chambers, who had established in Brisbane a respected commercial practice which was extended to Sydney in 1915. His known commercial buildings from this period include the Finney Isles & Co Building ('The Big Block') and Perry House in Brisbane's central business district, and the first Winchcombe Carson Woolstores at Teneriffe. Between 1901 and 1915 he was twice president of the Queensland Institute of Architects, and was president of the Australian Institute of Architects 1916 to 1918. He resided mainly in Sydney from 1915, but remained in partnership in Brisbane with Lange Leopold Powell 1911–1920 and Eric Marshall Ford 1920–1935.

The CTA Building was completed in mid-1907 and was opened officially by the Chief Justice of Queensland in August that year. It contained a "handsome dining hall" and bar on the ground floor, bedrooms for the accommodation of members, and a roof garden. A mansard roof and tower were removed at a later date, possibly when increased accommodation was being constructed c. 1914.

The CTA ranked amongst the most prominent of Brisbane's special interest associations, although membership was not confined to commercial travellers. With permanent headquarters, the club became a focal point for member interests and business. The association provided a variety of services to its members, including in 1914–1915 the provision of a purpose-built Sample Rooms Building, now demolished, on an adjacent site fronting Charlotte Street, acquired in 1913. The CTA negotiated discounts for commercial travellers at hotels throughout the state, and was affiliated with the United Travellers Association of Australasia. As well, it provided services such as mortuary funds, accident and sickness insurance funds, assistance with loans, scholarships for members' children, savings funds, allowances for needy members, and an employment register for out of work commercial travellers.

The Charlotte Street sample rooms did not prove to be as revenue-producing as anticipated. In consequence, in 1926, the CTA decided to erect as a leasing venture, a four-storeyed building on the Elizabeth Street section of the site they had acquired in 1913, which ran through to Charlotte Street between the CTA club rooms and the St Stephens School, Brisbane. The new building, formerly known as Hesketh House, and now demolished, replaced a winter garden, established by the CTA c. 1914 when the sample rooms fronting Charlotte Street were erected, and was connected with the 1906–1907 building at each level. The dining room and associated facilities were moved to the basement of the new building, leaving room in the old one for additional bedrooms.

Changing retail practice, prompted by improvements in transport and communications led to a decline in CTA membership after the Second World War. In 1949 the CTA sold the 1914–1915 sample rooms block and the 1927–1928 building to the Commonwealth of Australia, which used them to house the Engineering Branch of the Post Master General's Department. In 1963, the CTA also sold the 1906–1907 building to the Commonwealth. It was renamed Telecommunications House and occupied as offices of the PMG's marketing and commercial section. The PMG (Telecom after 1975) was located there until 1991.

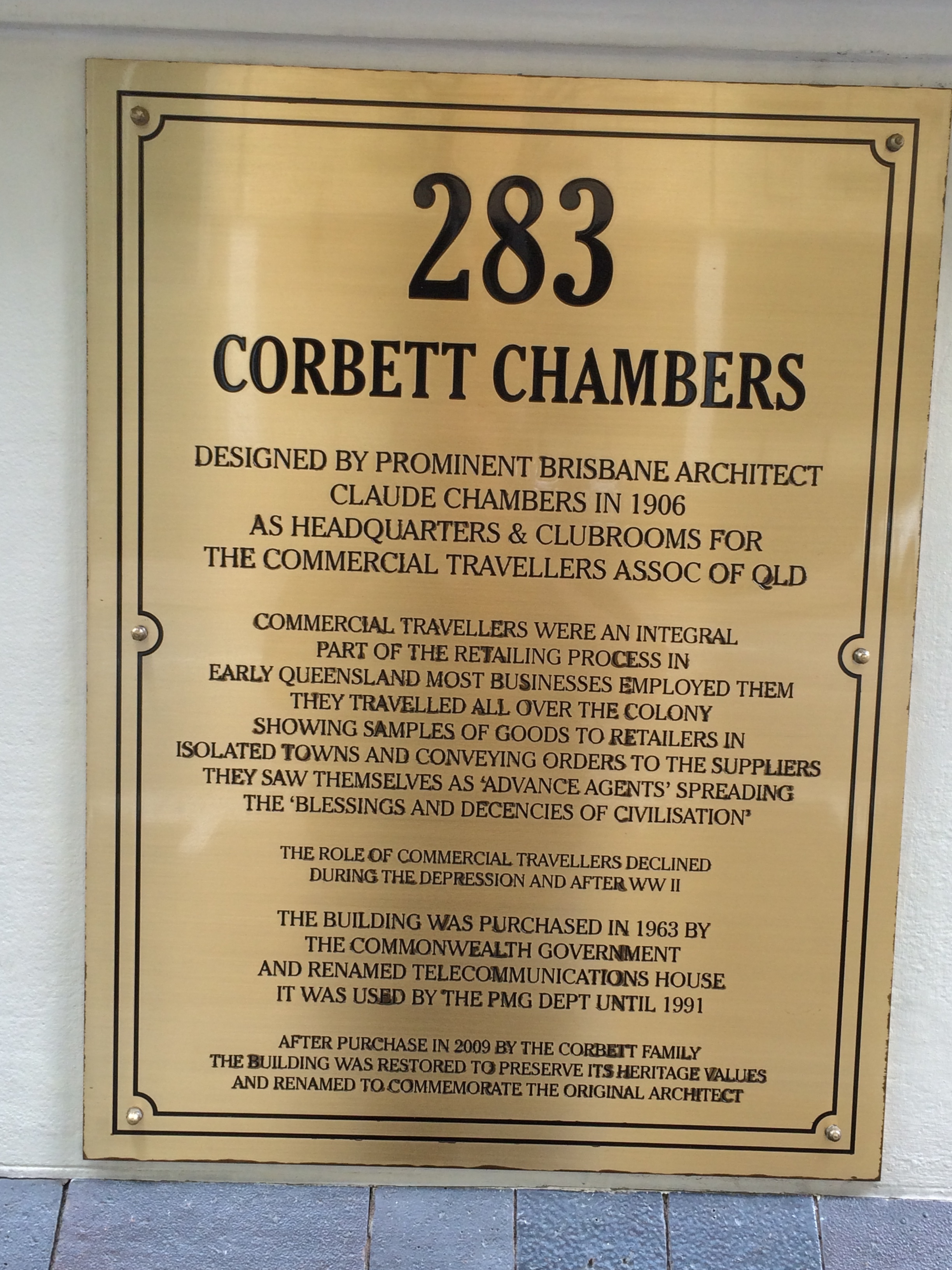
Plaque on Corbett Chambers, 2015

In 2009, the building was purchased and restored by the Corbett family. They renamed the building Corbett Chambers.

== Description ==
Telecommunications House is located on Elizabeth Street adjacent to the grounds of the St Stephens complex. It is a four-storey building with a basement, constructed of red face brick with contrasting cream rendered features on its facade.

The street facade is five arched bays wide, organised around a central bay emphasised by a ground floor entry portico, a second floor balcony, and a parapet level Classical pediment. The ground floor portico consisting of a central triangular pediment flanked by scroll-like brackets is supported by paired Tuscan columns, and the balcony above is supported on paired unfluted Composite columns. Paired brick pilasters, followed by paired, rendered Corinthian ones continue the vertical emphasis to the arch below parapet level.

On each side of the central bay the openings are all arched with keystones, and although they house windows at the ground floor level, form arcaded verandahs on the upper three levels. The arcaded upper levels have wrought iron balustrades with the initials CTA located centrally, apart from the second floor central balcony which has balustrading similar to that on the parapet.

The pediment at parapet level has an ornate central moulding of the CTA crest. Behind the facade the levels above the ground floor are recessed, previously providing a light well adjoining Hesketh House (now demolished). The northern face of the building is plainly rendered and has predominantly square openings apart from a couple of arched ones.

Internally the building was linked with neighbouring Hesketh House when it was constructed, and these links remained at the front of the building on the ground floor and two of the upper levels until Hesketh House was demolished. Some sections of ornate plaster ceiling and a pilaster capital remain towards the rear of the ground floor. Timber beams and columns are still evident on the level below the top floor. The interior is currently divided into a number of private offices.

== Heritage listing ==
The former Telecommunications House was listed on the Queensland Heritage Register on 5 April 2004 having satisfied the following criteria.

The place is important in demonstrating the evolution or pattern of Queensland's history.

Telecommunications House is important in demonstrating the development of retail trading practices in Queensland.

The place is important in demonstrating the principal characteristics of a particular class of cultural places.

It also demonstrates the principal characteristics of an early 1900s brick commercial building in Brisbane. The building is also important in demonstrating the principal characteristics of the commercial work of prominent Brisbane architect CW Chambers.

The place is important because of its aesthetic significance.

Telecommunications House is important for its aesthetic characteristics including the deeply modelled facade of contrasting face brickwork and rendered classical details. The building makes a strong contribution to the streetscape, being complementary in scale and design to the GPO buildings opposite and the neighbouring St Stephens complex.

The place has a special association with the life or work of a particular person, group or organisation of importance in Queensland's history.

Telecommunications House is important for its special association with the operations of the Commercial Travellers Association, a significant commercial association in Queensland in the late 19th and early 20th centuries, and for its association with C W Chambers as a good example of his commercial work.

== See also ==
- Osler House in Townsville was leased by the Commercial Travellers Association of Queensland as a Townsville clubhouse
