= Claude William Chambers =

Australian architect (1861–1947)

Claude William Chambers (1861–1947) was a prominent architect in Brisbane, Queensland and Sydney, New South Wales in Australia. Many of his works are listed on the Queensland Heritage Register.

== Early life ==
Claude William Chambers was born in Melbourne in 1861, the son of William Laws Chambers and his wife Emma.

On 12 January 1887, he married Evelina (Lena) Cowan (the adopted step-daughter of Robert Dalrymple) at the Presbyterian Church in Glebe in Sydney.

== Architectural career ==
From 1877 to 1881, Williams trained in Melbourne under civil engineer Albert Purchas while studying at the Prahran Technical College. From 1884 to 1885, he worked in Sydney for architects Blackman and Parks. In 1885, he moved to Brisbane and worked for Francis Drummond Greville Stanley until 1889.

He was one of the founding members and first secretary of the Queensland Institute of Architects.

His several partnerships between 1889 and 1935 produced designs for both Brisbane and Sydney including commercial buildings, warehouses and wharf buildings.

From 1889 to 1892, he was the junior partner in McCredie Brothers and Chambers.

From 1892 to 1910, he operated a solo practice as an architect and consulting engineer.

Lange Leopold Powell joined Chambers in a partnership Chambers and Powell from 1911 to 1920.

From 1920, Chambers partnered with Eric Marshall Ford (the office manager from Chamber and Powell) in the architectural firm, Chambers and Ford. The partnership lasted until 1951, although Chambers was largely not involved after 1935.

In 1929, he was appointed a Fellow of the Royal Institute of British Architects.

From 1931 to 1934, Chambers was part of a Sydney-based partnership with B. W. Hutton known as Chambers and Hutton.

== Later life ==
Chambers retired in 1935 and moved to Sydney. He died on 13 July 1947 in Sydney. He was buried on 14 July 1947 in the Northern Suburbs Cemetery (now Macquarie Park Cemetery) in North Ryde.

== Significant works ==
- 1889 :Whepstead house
- 1895: Smellie's Building
- 1906: Green House in Wickham Terrace, now part of the United Service Club Premises
- 1906: Headquarters and clubrooms for the Commercial Travellers Association, later Telecommunications House, now Corbett Chambers:
- 1910: Montpelier house in Wickham Terrace, now part of the United Service Club Premises
- 1907: RS Exton and Co Building
- 1911: Perry House, now the Royal Albert Hotel
