= United Service Club Premises =

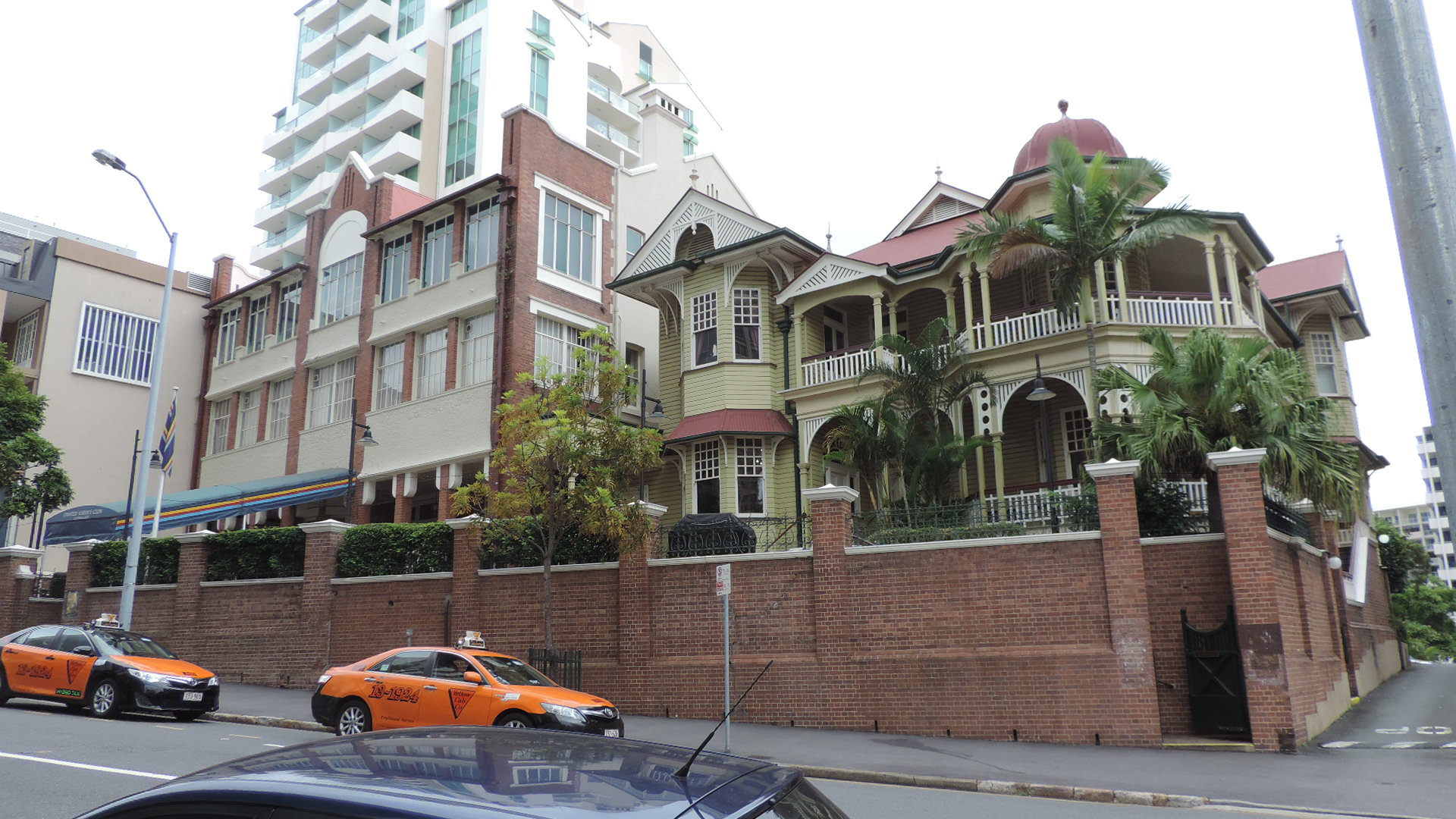
- United Service Club Premises (Montpelier left, Green House right), 2015

- Location within Queensland Location within Australia
- 27.4648°S 153.0243°E
- Location: 183 Wickham Terrace, Spring Hill, City of Brisbane, Queensland, Australia

History
- Design period: 1900–1914 (early 20th century)
- Built: 1906–1947

Site notes
- Architect: Claude William Chambers

Queensland Heritage Register
- Official name: United Service Club Premises, Montpelier, The Green House
- Type: state heritage (built, landscape)
- Designated: 28 April 2000
- Reference no.: 601776
- Significant period: 1900s–1940s (fabric, historical); 1940s (social)
- Significant components: trees/plantings, service wing, residential accommodation – guest house/s, steps/stairway, lead light/s, garden/grounds, residential accommodation – main house, basement / sub-floor, wall/s – retaining, billiards room

United Service Club Premises is a heritage-listed club house at 183 Wickham Terrace, Spring Hill, City of Brisbane, Queensland, Australia. It was designed by architect Claude William Chambers and built from 1906 to 1947. It is also known as Montpelier and The Green House. It was added to the Queensland Heritage Register on 28 April 2000.

== History ==
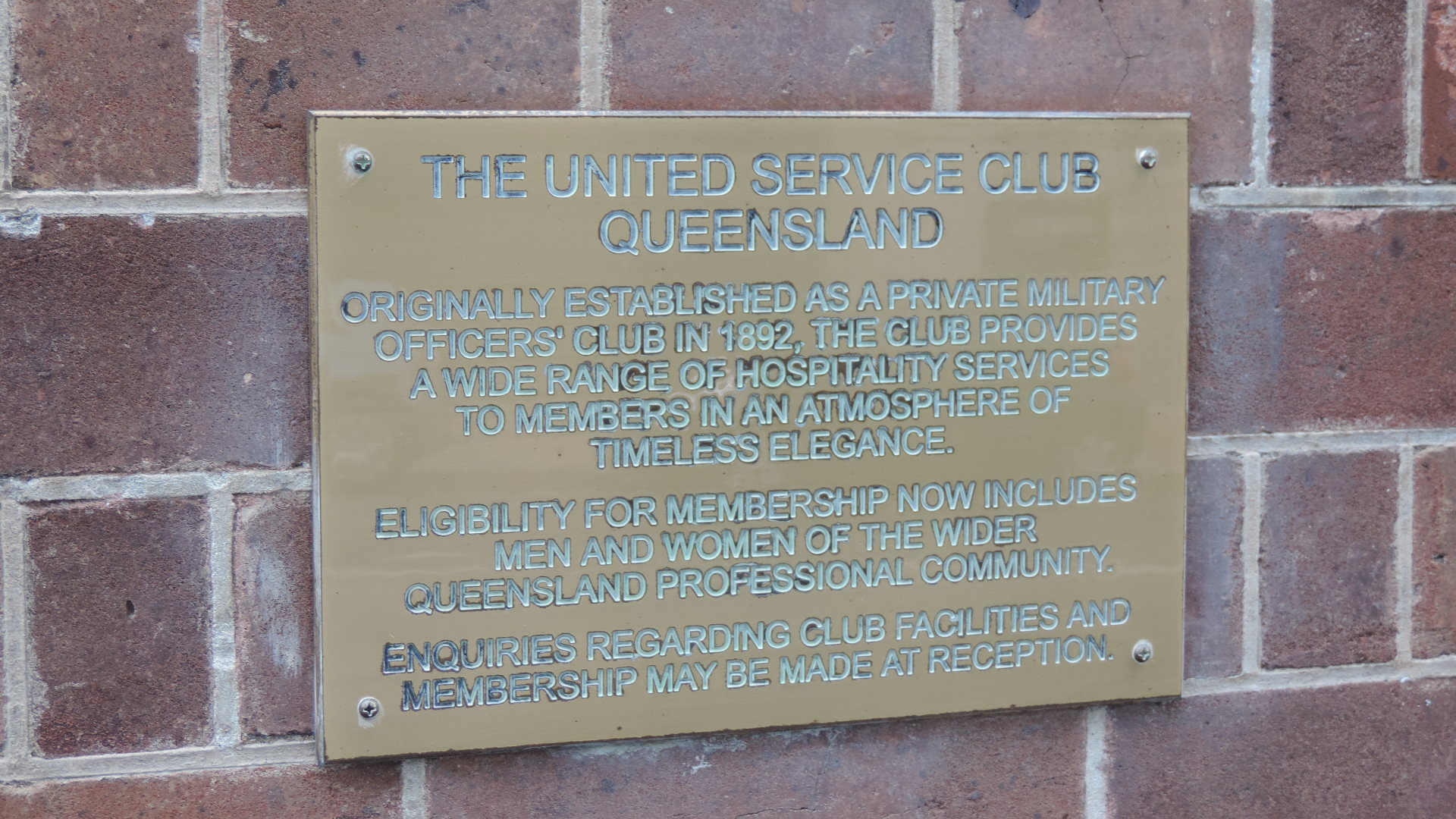
Plaque at entrance, Montpelier House, 2015

The United Service Club consists of two buildings, a c. 1907 timber house known as the Green House (on the right/east), and a masonry structure known as Montpelier, built c. 1910 on the site of an earlier three-storey masonry building, also known as Montpelier (on the left/west). Claude William Chambers was the architect of both the Green House and Montpelier. The buildings became the United Service Club premises in 1947. Prior to this date, both the existing and earlier Montpelier, and later the Green House, functioned primarily as residences and boarding houses.

The settlement of Brisbane was established as a penal colony in 1825, and while it remained as such for less than twenty years, no land was alienated from the Crown until 1856. In this year, portions of Spring Hill were sold in one acre lots. The Deed of Grant for the land on which Montpelier and the Green House were to be built was issued to William Wilson on 29 January 1856. Title to the property subsequently transferred to Anglican Archbishop Edward Tufnell in February 1864, coinciding with the construction of the original Montpelier. William Davies purchased the property in 1897 and it remained in the Davies family until purchased by the United Service Club in 1946.

Wickham Terrace, with its elevated position close to the city, quickly became popular with aspiring professional and business families following the sale of land in the 1850s. During the 1860s and 1870s Wickham Terrace was evolving into an area of boarding houses and homes, schools, clubs and medical rooms. Entrepreneurs built houses for rental and as lodging-houses, including Montpelier, built in 1864 as a pair of large semi-detached villas beside the Albert Street Wesleyan Methodist minister's home. Designed by prominent Brisbane architect Benjamin Backhouse, the two storey house with a hip roof and no verandahs soon became a lodging house. On 1 April 1865, an advertisement for the lease of a, "highly eligible and pleasantly situated two-storey BRICK HOUSE, situated on Wickham Terrace, near the Observatory", was included in the Brisbane Courier. It is likely that Montpelier is the building being described in the advertisement.

The Green House was constructed c. 1907 on vacant land between Montpelier and the Baptist City Tabernacle. Approval was given in October 1906 for a new building on Wickham Terrace, to be made of "wood", for William Davies. The building was designed by Claude William Chambers and constructed by A Anderson. The first occupant of the Green House was Dr Thomas Howard Morgan, who remained at 173 Wickham Terrace from 1908 to 1913. By 1928–29, the building was occupied by Mrs AM Whyte, at which time it was being advertised as a boarding house.

It appears Montpelier was replaced in 1911 with the existing three-storey masonry building which continued the name Montpelier. At this time a new brick boarding house on Wickham Terrace was constructed for William Davies. The architect was Claude William Chambers. It is possible that a portion of the 1864 villa was retained and incorporated into the c. 1910 Montpelier.

Until the United Service Club obtained the Wickham Terrace property in 1947, Montpelier was used almost continuously for the provision of boarding house style accommodation. During Tufnell's ownership of the house, Lady Musgrave Lodge, founded in 1885 by the wife of Queensland Governor Sir Anthony Musgrave, used the boarding house to provide accommodation for young women from 1888 until moving to the rear of 121 Wickham Terrace in 1892. Annie Mabel Forsyth leased Monpelier in 1910. These leased premises were used as a first-class private gentleman's hotel, and were so exclusive that applicants required references to obtain lodgings.

In 1940, the lease was purchased by Molly Sheehan, a former private secretary to politician Reginald Macdonnell King, Minister for Public Works and Public Construction in the Queensland Parliament from 1929 to 1932. Ms Sheehan remained as manager during World War II when the building was commandeered as accommodation for officers of field rank. One of the long-term residents of this period was Colonel Johnston, personal physician to American General Douglas MacArthur.

Ownership of the site was transferred to the United Service Club in November 1946, and the Club relocated to its new headquarters in 1947. Founded in 1892, the United Service Club had occupied several premises before moving to the Wickham Terrace site. The last relocation was precipitated by Australia's involvement in World War II, when club membership increased to 1200 so that new premises were needed urgently. In a near-city location, with a tram stop close-by, and provisions for ample parking, Montpelier and the Green House, with on-site tennis courts were ideal.

Immediately following the club's acquisition of the site, conversions teams of carpenters, bricklayers, electricians, refrigeration experts and others began on a refurbishment of the two boarding houses. The ground floor of Montpelier was used for two lounges, a dining room, library, bar and kitchen, the second floor for residential rooms, and the third floor for three billiard rooms, card room and bathing facilities. All levels had wide verandahs facing the city that provided pleasant places to sit on hot summer evenings. The verandahs were later enclosed on the two upper levels.

The Green House was not utilised at this time. Although valued at £5000, money was scarce immediately after the war, so various uses were considered such as providing a venue for entertaining women or renting rooms out to medical people. Although ladies were not admitted to the club, the Green House was rented to an exclusive ladies group, the Moreton Club. They remained tenants in the Green House until 1959 when the building was converted to professional rooms and offices to raise revenue for the United Service Club.

While a Ladies' Night on Thursdays was introduced in the 1940s, it was not until 1966 that women were permitted to join as associate members and the Green House refurbished. Club membership, once exclusively for serving and retired officers, was opened to nominated civilians about 1990 when both buildings were again refurbished. Further work, completed in 1996, included converting the brick building's 22 bedrooms to 16 units and enlarging the dining room. Refurbishment works were also completed on the Green House lounges, meeting rooms and top bar.

== Description ==
The United Service Club is located at 173–183 Wickham Terrace, Brisbane. The premises consists of a c. 1907 timber building, the Green House and a c. 1910 masonry building, Montpelier. A narrow laneway separates the Green House from the Baptist City Tabernacle to the east, while Montpelier abuts the neighbouring property to the west. There are plantings in front of both buildings, and substantial jacaranda trees to the rear.

=== Montpelier ===
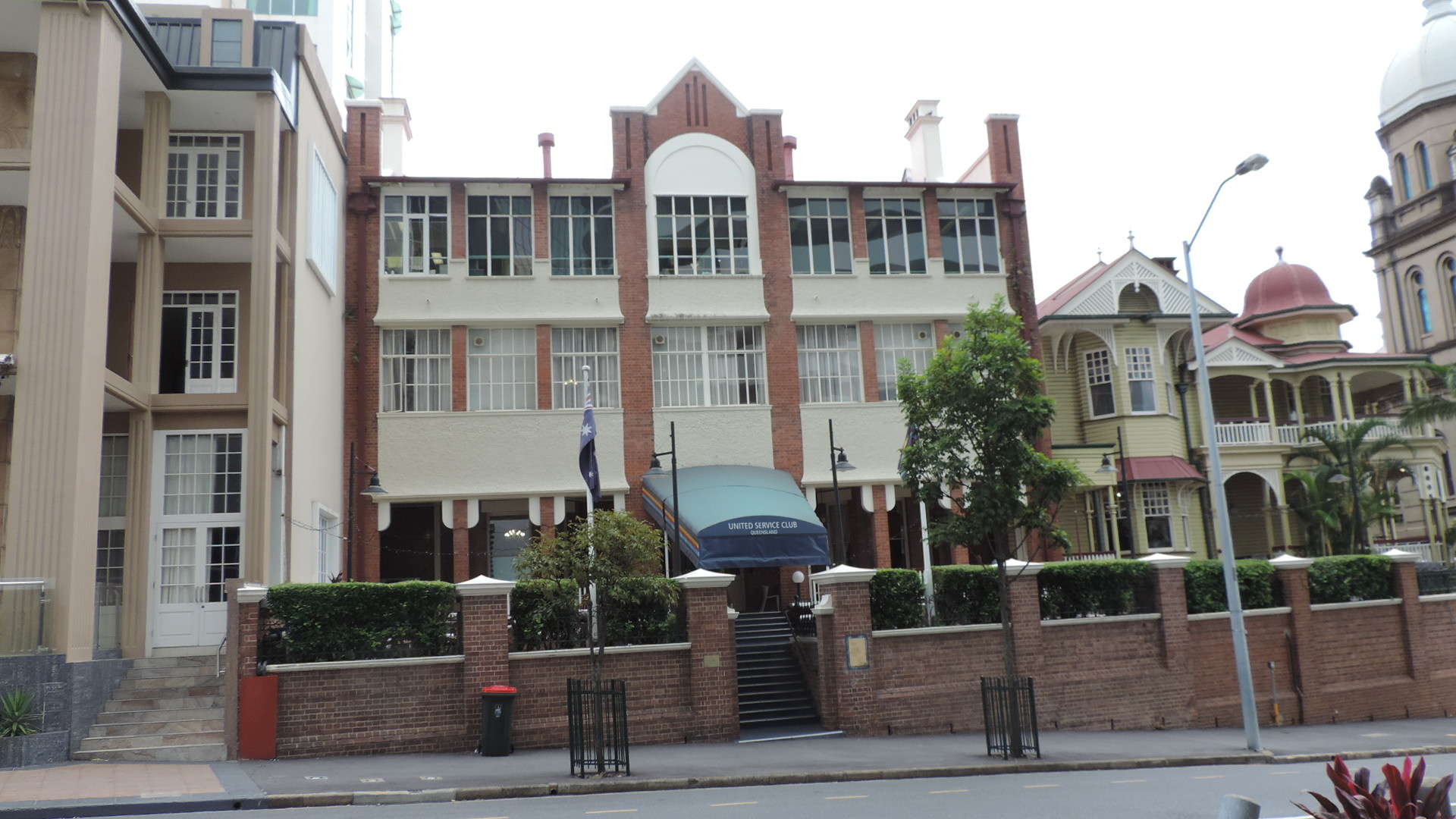
Montpelier House, 2015

Montpelier is elevated above, and set back from Wickham Terrace. It is a three-storey building with a basement, and is constructed of stone and brick, with a gabled corrugated iron roof. The front elevation faces south and addresses Wickham Terrace. The facade combines face brickwork and stucco finish, with brick piers dividing the elevation into seven sections. The facade returns a bay-width around the building. The piers at the central section and at either end of the facade rise above the roof line forming a parapet. The verandahs on the two upper levels are enclosed with windows and there are rendered masonry spandrels on each level. The back portion of the building is finished in smooth stucco and has many original sash windows. A wing continues from the north east corner of the building, while a separate, small service building is located on the north-west corner of Montpelier.

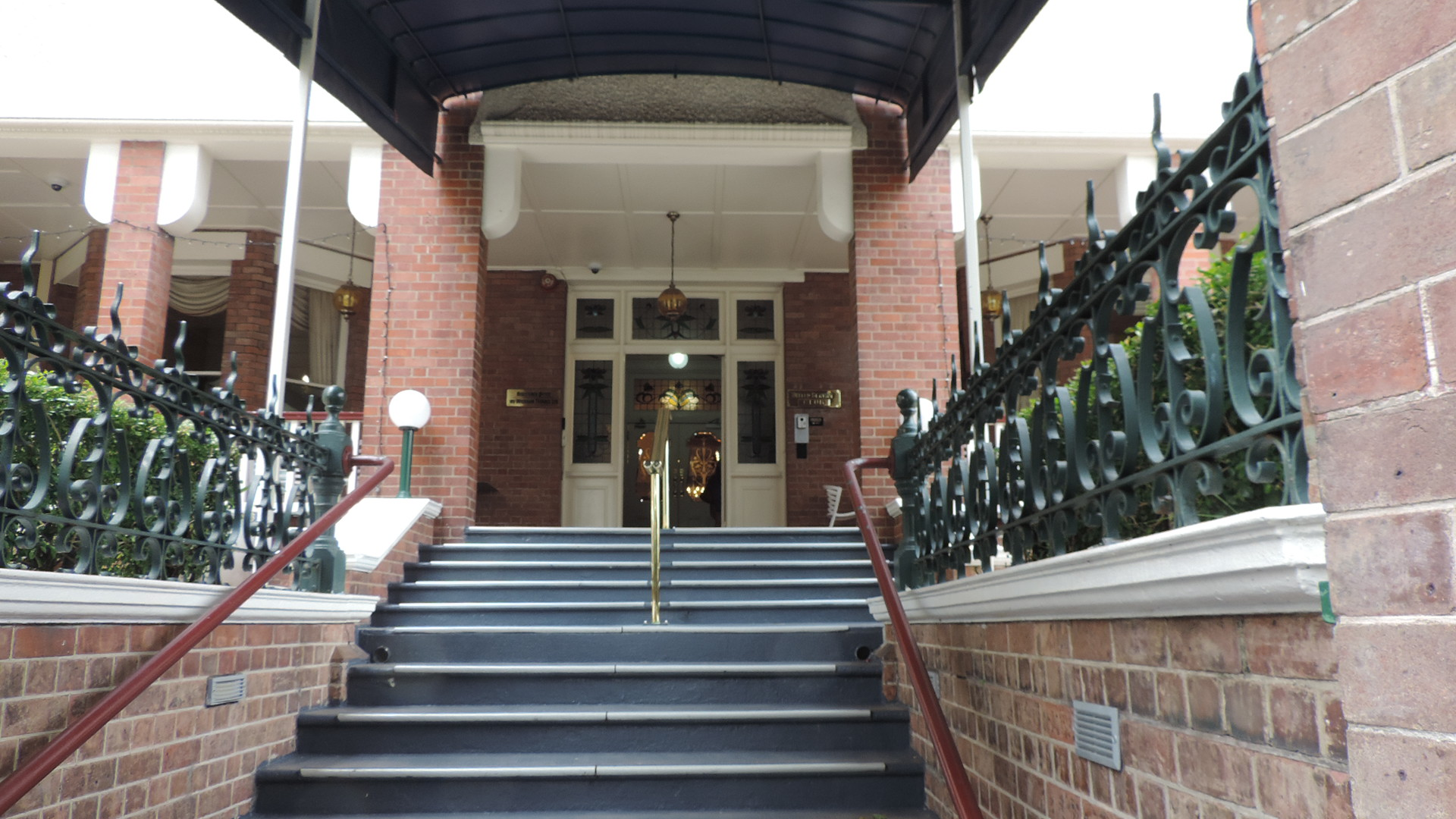
Entrance, Montpelier House, 2015

The front entry to Montpelier is accessed via a set of masonry stairs and a ground floor verandah. This verandah has an ochre, yellow and grey terrazzo floor with brass strips and the lettering "USC". The centrally located entrance lobby opens to lounge areas on the west and east sides of the building. These lounges have bay windows overlooking the front verandah, and fireplaces located on the extreme east and west walls. The hall leads to another lounge area and through to the dining room. The dining room extends east behind the Green House. Pressed metal ceilings are located in the lounges and the dining room. A kitchen and offices are located to the rear of Montpelier on this level. Four sets of stairs provide access to the basement level, and/or the level above. The main stair, located behind the front, western lounge, is decorated with a leadlight window. Bathroom facilities, containing early fittings, are located along the western side of this level. Access to the Green House is gained via two lounge areas on the eastern side of Montpelier.

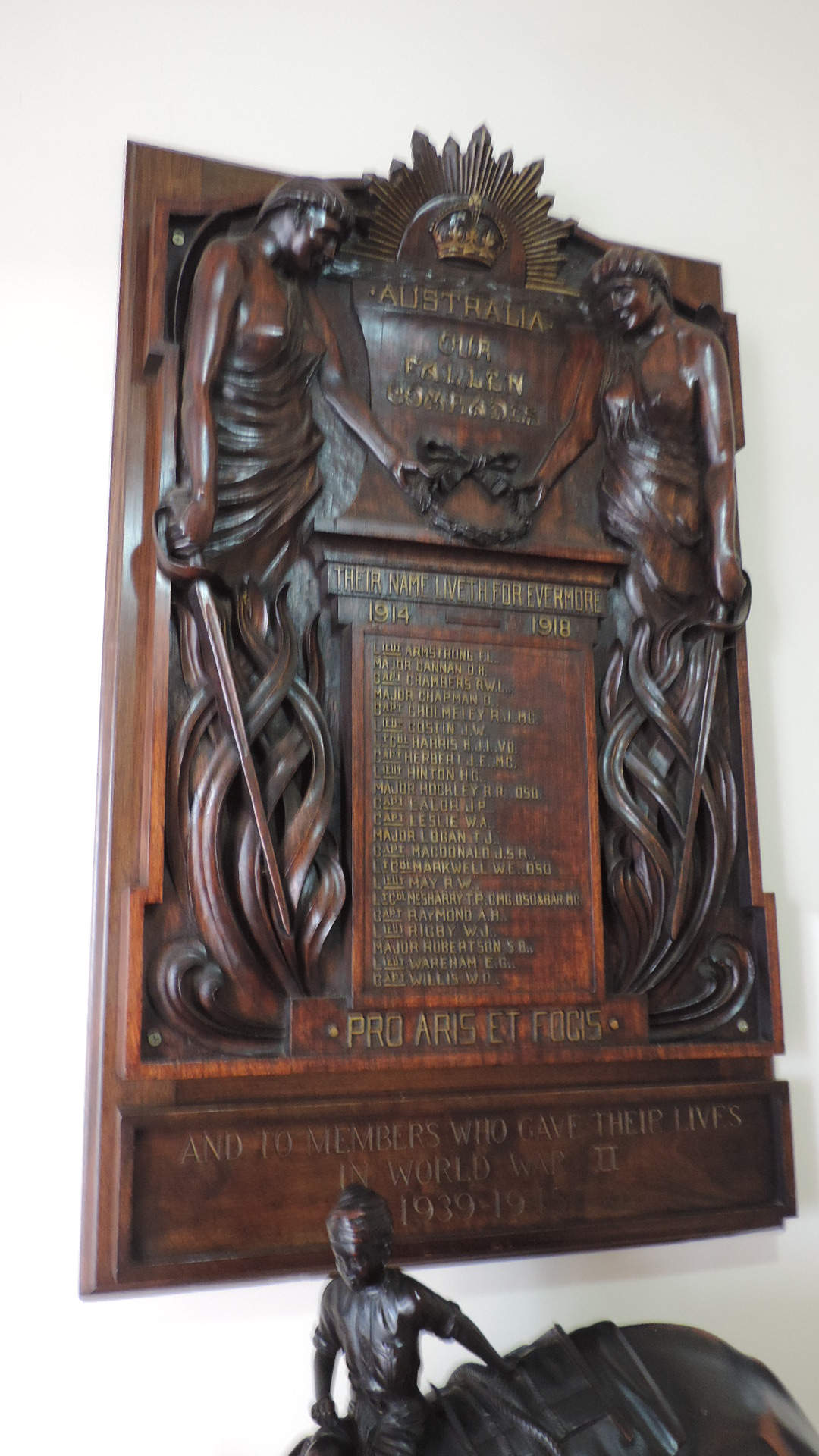
World War I Honour Board, Montpelier House, 2015

An honour board commemorating club members who died in World War I is located in the entrance area.

Level two of Montpelier contains the billiard room and accommodation facilities. Many of the accommodation rooms are fitted with ensuites, although original bathroom facilities remain on the western side of this level. A large patio area to the rear of this level overlooks Spring Hill to the north-west.

Level three of Montpelier consists of function rooms to the front of the building, a reading lounge, and accommodation throughout the remainder of the floor. There is also a patio of the same dimensions and location as that on the level below.

The basement in Montpelier is brick. Arches extend along the length of part of the basement, some of which are infilled. The basement houses cellars, bottle shop, offices and store rooms. A rear entry and formal staircase provide access to the ground level.

A small service building is located on the north-west corner of Montpelier. This is a stone building with a stucco finish marked to resemble ashlar. It is currently used as offices and storage rooms.

=== The Green House ===
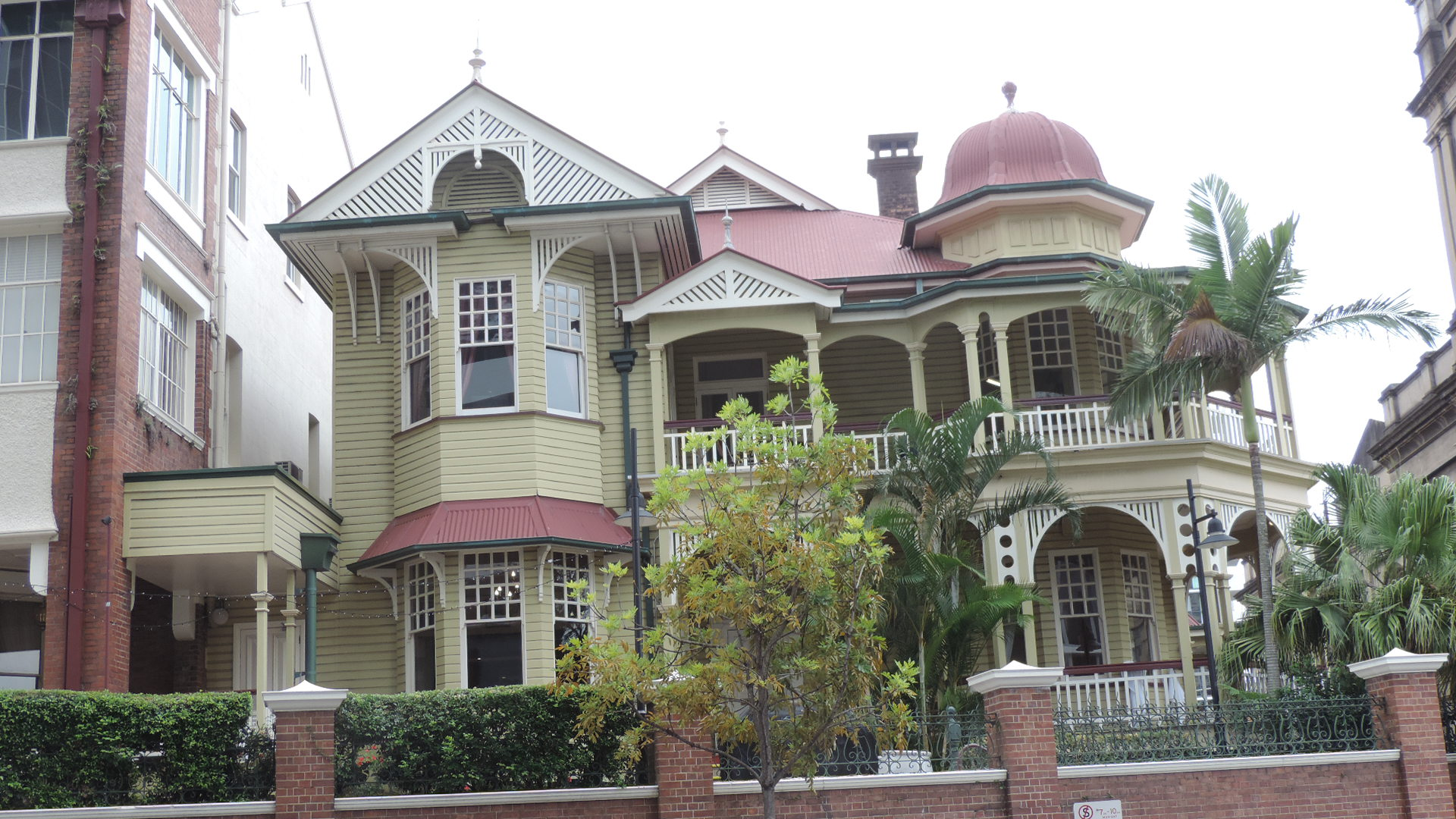
The Green House, 2015

The Green House is located to the east of Montpelier and shares a similar setback from Wickham Terrace. A tall brick retaining wall with expressed piers and topped with a decorative cast-iron fence, extends along the front of both buildings, and is higher in front of the Green House due to the slope of Wickham Terrace. A masonry set of stairs gives access to the Green House from the Wickham Terrace footpath.

The Green House is an ornate two-storey timber and brick building with an asymmetrical facade and a multi-gabled roof in painted corrugated iron, facing south across Wickham Terrace. The Green House has a projecting gable and faceted bay with an octagonal domed roof on the southern elevation and a second projecting bay along the eastern elevation. Both bays have decorative timber bargeboards. To the rear of the building is a carpark area and later extensions by the United Service Club which connect the Green House to Montpelier.

The Green House has first and second floor verandahs with narrow timber columns, stilted arches between the columns, decorative capitals, and timber balusters. There are also verandahs to both levels on the rear, northern elevation. Windows located on both the first and second levels are elongated with twelve to sixteen panes of glass in the frame, fairly typical of the Anglo-Dutch elements that are evident in the design of the building. A staircase is located in the eastern elevation of the building. The Green House is joined to Montpelier, and a door, accessed from the joined ground level verandahs of the buildings, provides an entry to both Montpelier and the Green House.

Concrete stairs in the southern, front elevation lead to the ground floor verandah which, like the first floor balcony, extends from the southern elevation around and along the eastern elevation. The front, main entrance is a panelled timber door with moulded architrave. The words "GREEN HOUSE" appear on the architrave.

Internally, the Green House is lined in tongue-in-groove timber panelling, with a picture rail. The ground floor of the Green House contains the "Military Bar", the "Moreton Room" and the "Norman Pixley Room". The Military Bar is located at the front, western side of the building and features a bay window. It has a panelled, timber door with decorative coloured glass fanlight and breezeway assembly. The double hung sash windows have a single large pane of glass at the base of the window frame and twelve panes of small glass in the upper section of the frame. The Moreton Room occupies most of the remaining floor space, and features pressed metal cornices and ceilings. Part of the ceiling has been lowered to house air conditioning ducts. A timber panelled door with fanlight assembly of recent origin opens to the verandah running along the eastern elevation. An early fireplace is located on the northern wall of the room. Opening off the Moreton Room is the "Norman Pixley Room" which forms part of the faceted bay that projects out at the corner of the southern and eastern elevations. This room also has a pressed metal ceiling and a fireplace in its northern wall.

A dogleg timber staircase with half landing is located at the front of the Green House. A prominent feature of this staircase is the large arched window, with decorative coloured glass, located in the western elevation. The window has three rectangular sections at its base and three sections forming the arch of the window. The window frame and keystone are timber. The stairs lead to a hallway, from which open a series of offices. The office doorways are surmounted by glass fanlights, and one office has a pressed metal ceiling. One of the doorways is surmounted with a timber arch with exaggerated keystone and glass fanlight. Fireplaces exist in two rooms, and align with those found on the ground floor. Another staircase, of recent construction, is located in the northern elevation of the building.

At the basement level of the Green House, is a recent plant room.

Shrubs and other plantings are located in front of both Montpelier and the Green House, while large jacaranda trees dominate gardens to the rear of the United Service Club.

== Heritage listing ==
United Service Club Premises was listed on the Queensland Heritage Register on 28 April 2000 having satisfied the following criteria.

The place is important in demonstrating the evolution or pattern of Queensland's history.

The United Service Club Premises, comprising the Green House (1906–07) and Montpelier (1910), are important in demonstrating the evolution of Wickham Terrace as an elite street of middle class boarding houses and residences, schools, clubs, medical rooms and private hospitals, a pattern of development which commenced in the 1860s and was sustained well into the 20th century. They are part of a tradition of use of the site and of Wickham Terrace, which is one of Brisbane's most prestigious streets.

The Green House, erected 1906–07 as residence-cum-professional rooms and first let to a medical practitioner, illustrates a pattern established in the 1860s whereby Wickham Terrace was a popular location for medical men, who generally practised from their own home. The association of the Terrace with the medical and allied professions is sustained to this day. Montpelier, purpose-built in 1910 as a large boarding/guest house or private hotel, demonstrates the continued popularity of Wickham Terrace with the affluent middle-classes as a residential location. The building's continued use as accommodation is important in illustrating this aspect of the history of Wickham Terrace.

The place is important in demonstrating the principal characteristics of a particular class of cultural places.

Both buildings are important in illustrating the principal characteristics of a type of design and/or of a class of place. The Green House is a Federation-era timber residence which is important in illustrating the principal characteristics of a distinctly regional, climate-responsive style of architecture with polygonal bays and widened verandahs, abundant carpenter decoration, and beautiful and unusual flying gables. It is important also in illustrating a class of place [residence-cum-professional rooms] once common along Wickham Terrace. Montpelier demonstrates stylistic elements of Federation Arts and Crafts architectural style, and has some handsome interior details such as beam-and-column ensembles, well-detailed joinery, fireplaces, and Art Nouveau pressed metal ceilings, cornices and leaded glass. Importantly, Montpelier is significant in illustrating a now rare example of its type: an early 20th century purpose-built, middle-class private hotel or boarding/guest house.

Both buildings are significant also in illustrating the principal characteristics of the work of respected architect Claude William Chambers, who had one of Brisbane's largest architectural practices in the early 20th century. The Green House is a fine example of his domestic work, and Montpelier, the former private hotel/boarding house, is important in illustrating the skill and breadth of Chambers' commercial work.

The place is important because of its aesthetic significance.

In both buildings aesthetic value is engendered by the quality of design, materials, detailing and workmanship. The aesthetic appeal of the buildings is enhanced by mature planting, including jacaranda trees at the rear of the buildings.

Montpelier and the Green House are significant for their contribution to the Wickham Terrace streetscape, with its range of important building types dating from the 1860s to the 1930s and the fine adjacent parklands. The Terrace contributes significantly to the Brisbane townscape, and the United Service Club Premises, so prominently located near the intersection of Wickham Terrace and Upper Edward Street and adjacently to the dramatically designed Baptist City Tabernacle, and visible from well along Edward Street, are important elements in the streetscape and contribute significantly to Brisbane's townscape.

The place has a strong or special association with a particular community or cultural group for social, cultural or spiritual reasons.

The buildings have a special association with the United Service Club of Queensland for social and cultural reasons, having been the home of the club since 1947, and with the Moreton Club, which occupied the Green Room from 1947 to 1959.

The place has a special association with the life or work of a particular person, group or organisation of importance in Queensland's history.

The buildings have a special association with the United Service Club of Queensland for social and cultural reasons, having been the home of the club since 1947, and with the Moreton Club, which occupied the Green Room from 1947 to 1959.
