= Australian Instructional Corps =

- Active: 1921–55
- Country: Australia
- Branch: Army
- Role: Training
- Engagements: Second World War; Korean War

Insignia
- Abbreviation: AIC

The Australian Instructional Corps (AIC) was a corps of the Australian Army that existed between 1921 and 1955. Tasked with providing training to soldiers serving in Australia's part-time military force, the corps consisted of Permanent force warrant officers and senior non commissioned officers from all arms of service, who were posted to Citizen Force units as cadre staff, filling various regimental and training appointments. During the Second World War, the majority of the corps' personnel were transferred to the Second Australian Imperial Force, and in the aftermath of the war the corps eventually became part of the fledgling Australian Regular Army. In the post-war years, as the focus of Australia's defence strategy shifted towards the maintenance of a strong Regular force, the corps' role declined and it was eventually disbanded in 1955.

== History ==
Formed on 14 April 1921, the Australian Instructional Corps replaced the Administrative and Instructional Staff that had been in existence within the Army since Australia's Federation in 1901. It was raised in the aftermath of the First World War following the demobilisation of the Australian Imperial Force, when Australia's part-time military forces were reorganised to re-assume the main responsibility for the nation's defences. As part of the reorganisation, it was decided to raise a force of two cavalry divisions and five infantry divisions with various supporting arms to be maintained through a mixture of voluntary and compulsory service.

Consisting of a small cadre of permanent force warrant officers and senior non-commissioned officers, along with the Australian Staff Corps, the AIC was tasked with providing training to the part-time soldiers of the Citizen Force of all arms and services, including combat and technical branches. Upon formation, the corps had an establishment of around 600 personnel, which was a large portion of the small 1,600-strong permanent force. AIC members wore distinctive uniforms, with unique embellishments and badges of rank. Members were posted to units across Australia, filling various roles including acting as the adjutant or regimental sergeant major in many Citizen Force units, and were tasked with running promotion, qualification and specialisation courses for citizen soldiers and with administering school cadet units.

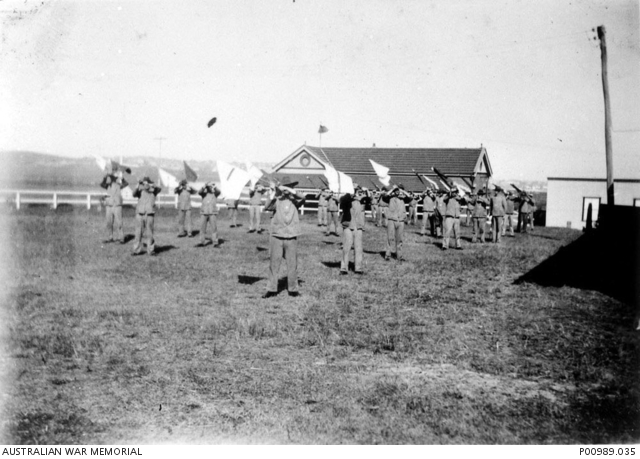
An AIC instructor training course at Sydney, 1936

Although it had been intended that members would receive special instructional training, due to budgetary constraints there were no instructor training courses run until 1935 when small courses began at Randwick. At this time, concerns about the strategic outlook in Europe and Asia resulted in a slow move towards re-armament within Australia and the AIC's role in preparing Australia's military for war grew. However, the size of the corps remained the same until 1940–41 when, after the reintroduction of conscription – which had been suspended in 1929 – the corps was expanded to an authorised strength of 185 quartermasters and 1,039 warrant and non commissioned officers.

Throughout the Second World War, the corps was largely subsumed into the Second Australian Imperial Force, as instructors volunteered to serve overseas; upon the conclusion of the war, the AIC became part of the Interim Army that was established as Australia moved towards the establishment of the Australian Regular Army that would have precedence over the part-time elements that had previously been the focus of Australia's defence strategy. After this, the role of the corps slowly diminished as various arms of the service raised their own schools, which became responsible for producing their own instructors and trainers. Around the same time, amidst the context of the Korean War and the strategic exigencies of the Cold War, the training of part-time soldiers moved towards a more centralised scheme, further reducing the role of the AIC. The corps was officially disbanded on 19 May 1955, although according to historian Peter Dennis "for practical purposes it had ceased functioning several years earlier".
