= Perry House, Brisbane =

Heritage-listed building in Brisbane, Queensland

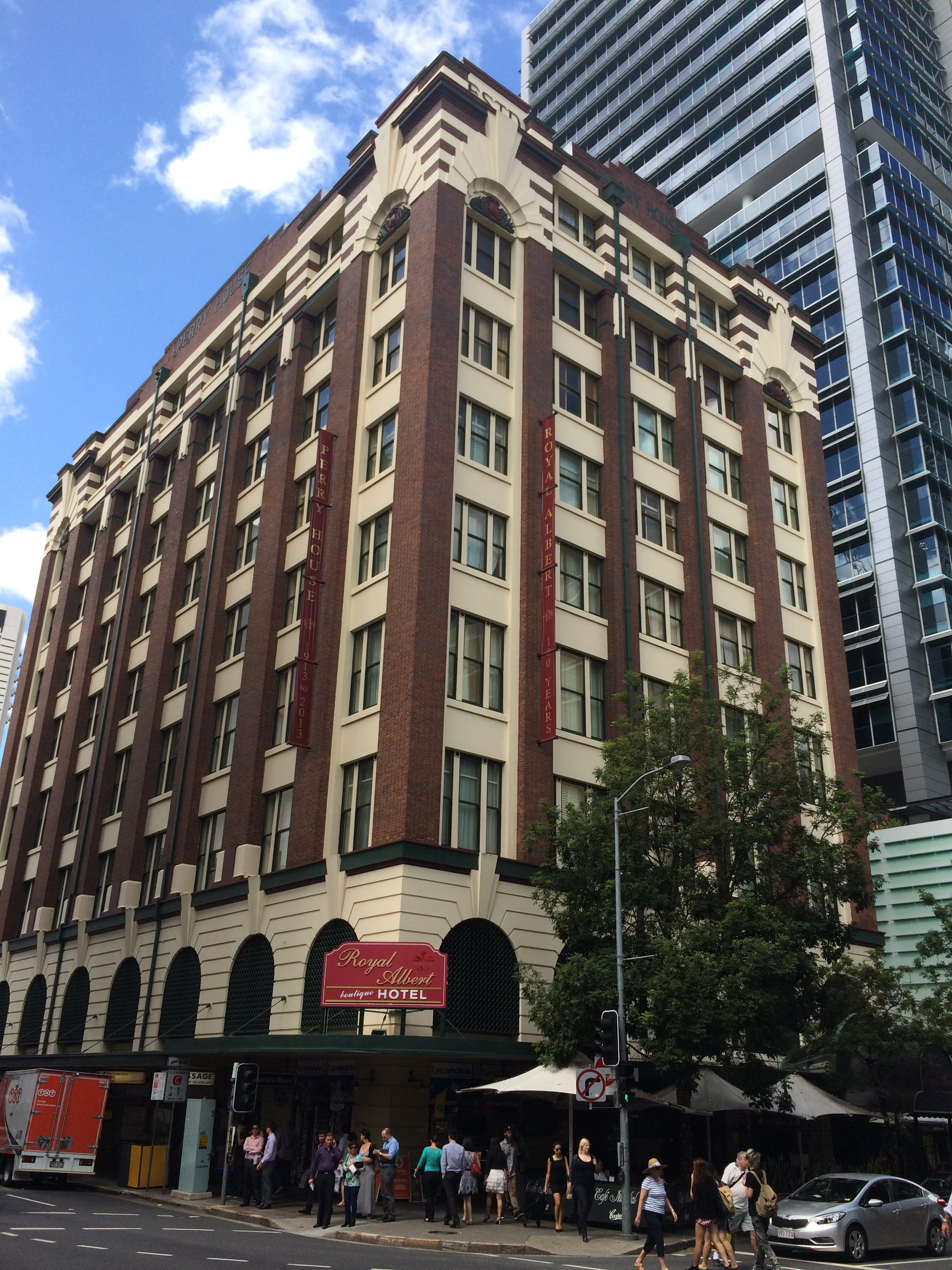
- Perry House, 2015

- Location within Queensland Location within Australia
- 27.4704°S 153.0264°E
- Location: 167 Albert Street, Brisbane City, Queensland, Australia

History
- Design period: 1900–1914 (early 20th century)
- Built: 1911–1923

Site notes
- Architect: Claude William Chambers

Queensland Heritage Register
- Official name: Perry House, Royal Albert Apartments
- Type: state heritage (built)
- Designated: 27 October 1994
- Reference no.: 600103
- Significant period: 1911–1913, 1923 (fabric)
- Builders: Thomas Keenan

Perry House is a heritage-listed office building at 167 Albert Street (corner of Elizabeth Street), Brisbane City, Queensland, Australia. It was designed by Claude William Chambers and built from 1911 to 1923 by Thomas Keenan. It is also known as Royal Albert Apartments. It was added to the Queensland Heritage Register on 27 October 1994.

== History ==
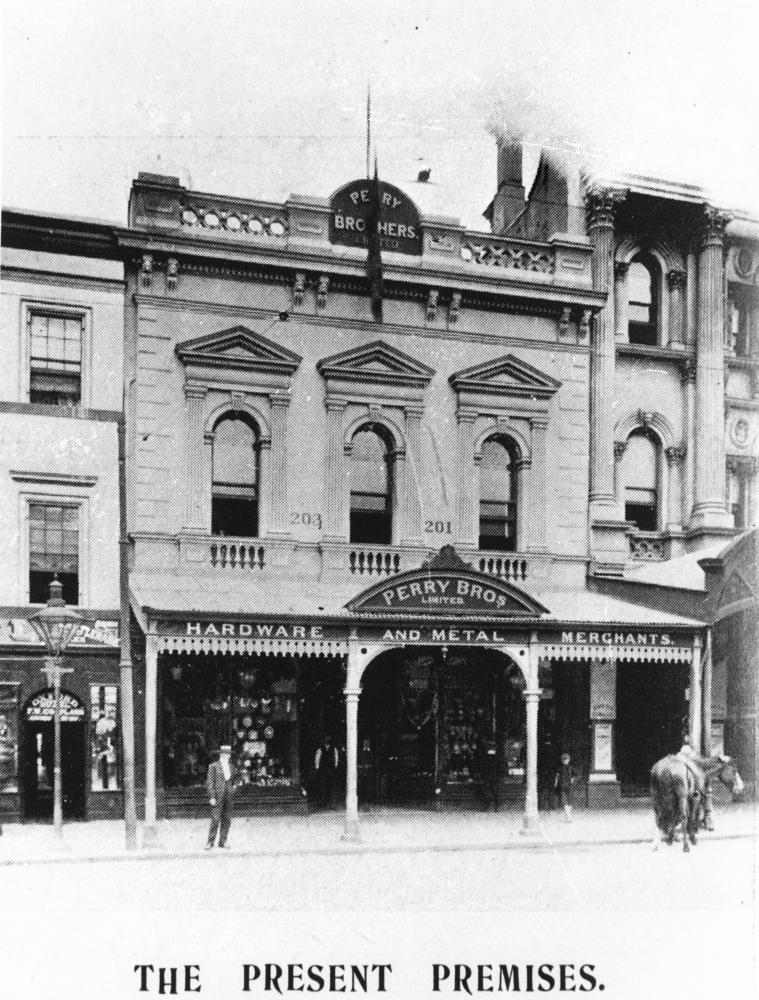
Queen Street premises, 1906

Perry House was designed in 1910 by Claude William Chambers to house the business of Perry Brothers, whose hardware firm had been in operation in Brisbane since 1860. William Perry, father of the Perry brothers – Herbert and George – was a prominent Brisbane businessman. Before the construction of the building, the Perry brothers had operated a wholesale outlet in Queen Street. They were to expand their operation at Perry House, as every floor of the building was occupied with their business activities and storage of their goods.

Charles William Chambers was a prominent Brisbane architect of the time. He trained in Melbourne and worked in Sydney, before joining Francis Drummond Greville Stanley in Brisbane and establishing his own firm in 1889. His several partnerships between 1889 and 1935 produced designs for both Brisbane and Sydney including commercial buildings, warehouses and wharf buildings. Lange Leopold Powell, another notable Brisbane architect, joined Chambers in a partnership in 1911 and managed the construction of Perry House. Thomas Keenan, the builder, had a long career in Brisbane from 1886 to 1923.

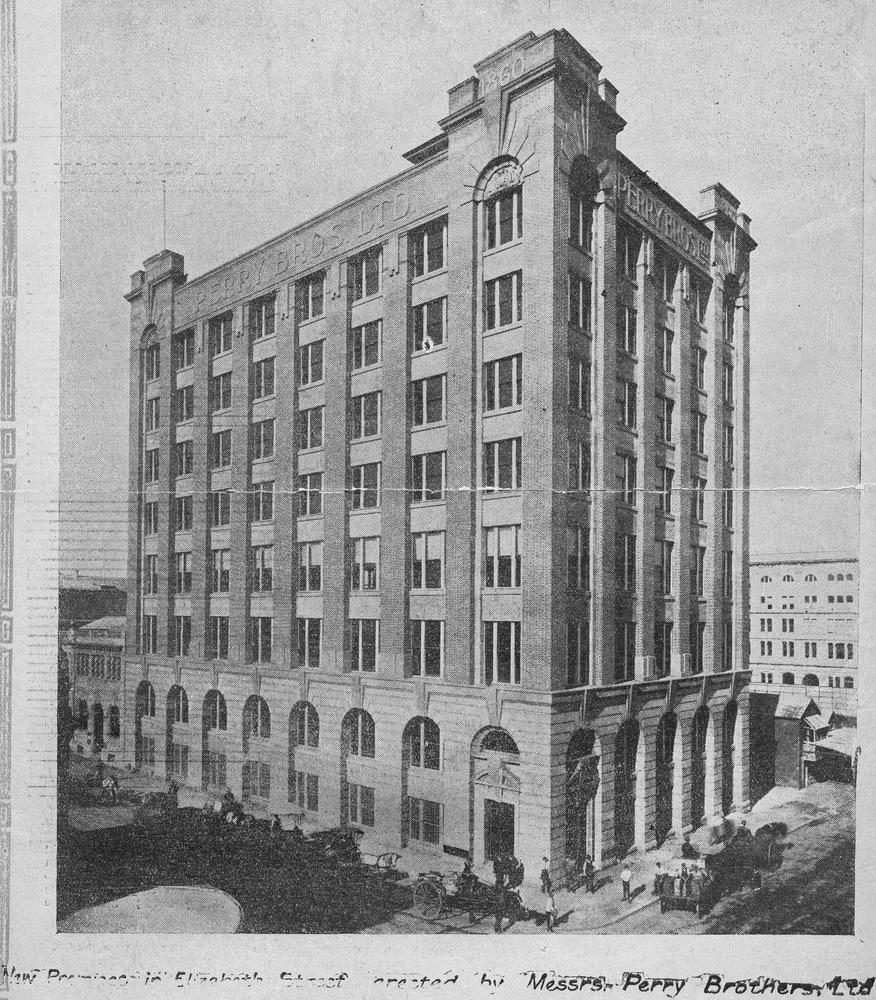
Perry House, 1913

The construction of Perry House occupied a considerable period of time, beginning in 1911 and not reaching completion until early 1913. Frequent strikes appear to have slowed progress. Perry House was the highest building in Brisbane on its completion and its construction was followed with great interest by the Brisbane community. An extra storey, designed by Powell, was added in 1923.

In 1996, the building underwent a major redevelopment and was opened as the Royal Albert Hotel.

== Description ==
Originally an eight storeyed, timber frame brickwork construction in the Federation warehouse tradition, this building is set on a two-storey podium of cement render. Plain brick piers, linked at each floor level by recessed horizontal bands of cement render, rise from above the podium. The corner piers are extended to block-like turrets above the roof line. The original plain brick parapet bore the name "Perry Bros. Ltd.". This was removed in 1923 to make way for the addition of another storey between the turrets. The present parapet above the additional storey bears the name "Perry House". The strong straight lines of the piers are relieved at both podium and turret levels by the use of arch and keystone elements. Bands of cement render on the turrets and upper storey provide an intensified echo of the banded effect on the main body of the building.

The building presents an integrated exterior, with little alteration except for the addition of the upper storey, minor modifications to the ground floor facade and the addition of a street awning with pressed metal ceilings. Major internal work on each floor has concealed the timber frame, with beams above lowered ceilings and columns encased.

== Heritage listing ==
Perry House was listed on the Queensland Heritage Register on 27 October 1994 having satisfied the following criteria.

The place is important in demonstrating the evolution or pattern of Queensland's history.

It demonstrates the evolution of a method of merchandising where retailing firms grew into large wholesaling enterprises.

The place is important because of its aesthetic significance.

The robust qualities of the lower floors, the simplicity of the materials, verticality of design and accentuation of the corners combine to give a landmark quality to the building which exhibits particular aesthetic qualities valued by the community.

The place is important in demonstrating a high degree of creative or technical achievement at a particular period.

It demonstrates a high degree of technical achievement for the period 1910–13 as an example of a very tall building in a timber-framed construction method which was obsolescent by this period.

The place has a special association with the life or work of a particular person, group or organisation of importance in Queensland's history.

It has strong association with:

- the prominent hardware merchandising firm Perry Brothers who commenced business in Brisbane in 1860
- the commercial work of architects CW Chambers and Lange Powell whose contributions to the commercial buildings of Brisbane are significant.
