= Charles Tucker (British Army officer) =

British Army officer (1838–1935)

Lieutenant-General Sir Charles Tucker GCB GCVO
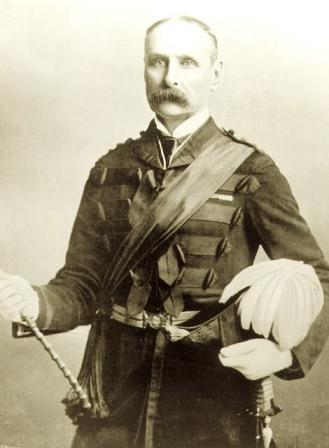
- Born: 6 December 1838; Ashburton, Devon, England
- Died: 22 December 1935 (aged 97); Biarritz, France
- Military career
- Allegiance: United Kingdom
- Branch: British Army
- Rank: Lieutenant-General
- Commands: 7th division (South Africa); Scottish Command
- Conflicts: Bhutan expedition Perak War; Zulu War; Second Boer War
- Awards: Knight Grand Cross of the Order of the Bath; Knight Grand Cross of the Royal Victorian Order

Lieutenant-General Sir Charles Tucker, GCB, GCVO (6 December 1838 – 22 December 1935) was a British Army officer during the late 19th and early 20th centuries.

== Early life and family ==
Tucker was born at The Hall, Ashburton, Devon, son of Robert Tucker, and was educated at Marlborough College.

He married first, in 1865, Matilda Frederica Hayter (died 1897), daughter of John Hayter, Painter-in-Ordinary to Queen Victoria, and secondly, in 1902, Nelly O'Connell, only daughter of Sir Maurice O'Connell, 2nd Bt.

== Military career ==
Commissioned into the 22nd Foot in 1855, in November 1860 Tucker transferred to the 80th Staffordshire volunteers, with whom he served in the Bhutan expedition (1865) and the Perak War (1875). He first came to prominence during the Zulu War when, as a major, he commanded the Fort at Kopje Allein in 1879. Later that year he commanded the 80th Regiment in operations against the Zulus, and was promoted lieutenant-colonel and appointed a companion of the Order of the Bath (CB).

From 1891 he served in Natal. He was promoted major-general in 1893 and in 1895 left Natal for India, where he commanded the Secunderabad district, until the end of 1899.

In December 1899, following the outbreak of the Second Boer War, Tucker was ordered by the commander-in-chief of forces in South Africa, Lord Roberts, to take command of the 7th division, participating in the relief of Kimberley and the advance on Bloemfontein. After the fall of Pretoria he commanded the garrison in the city. He then led a force based on Bloemfontein, guarding the lines of communication, until he left South Africa in March 1902. He was appointed a Knight Commander of the Order of the Bath (KCB) in November 1900, in recognition of his services in South Africa, and invested as such by King Edward VII on 13 May 1902, after his return to the UK. In his final despatch from South Africa in June 1902, Lord Kitchener, commander-in-chief of the forces during the latter part of the war, described Tucker as an officer who "has never feared responsibility, or failed in giving emphatic pronouncement to the good common-sense of which he is possessed".

Tucker returned to South Africa with his new wife in June 1902, but the war had now ended with the Peace of Vereeniging, and he left the following month from Cape Town on the SS Canada, arriving at Southampton in late July. He was promoted to lieutenant-general in the South Africa Honours list published on 26 June 1902, and two months later commanded the Colonial forces present in London during the coronation of King Edward VII.

He became general officer commanding Scottish District in 1903 and, subsequently, the first general officer commanding-in-chief for Scottish Command in 1905, before retiring later that year. He was advanced to Knight Grand Cross of the Order of the Bath in June 1912. He spent much of his retirement at Biarritz, France, where he died on 22 December 1935, aged 97. He was buried at Ashburton, Devon.

He was also colonel of the Cheshire Regiment (1909–1911) and of the South Staffordshire Regiment (1911–1935).

== Decorations ==
Most Honourable Order of the Bath

- CB - Companion – 1879.
- KCB - Knight Commander – 29 November 1900. In recognition of services in connection with the Campaign in South Africa 1899-1900.
- GCB - Knight Grand Cross – 1912.

Royal Victorian Order

- GCVO - Knight Grand Cross – 1905.

Tucker's decorations are held by the Staffordshire Regiment Museum.

Military offices
Preceded by Archibald Hunter	GOC Scottish District (GOC-in-C Scottish Command from 1905); 1903–1905	Succeeded by Sir Edward Leach
