= Nulli Secundus =

Nulli Secundus (Latin for "Second to None").

== Australian Defence Force ==
- Motto of 2/8th Australian Infantry Battalion, 6th Division, 19th Brigade, Royal Australian Army. 30 October 1939 - 14 December 1945
- Motto of Nine Squadron Royal Australian Corps of Transport (active from 1973)

=== Affiliates ===
- Motto of 402 Squadron Watsonia of the Australian Air Force Cadets (4 Wing, Victoria)

== British Armed Forces ==
- Motto of the Coldstream Guards (active from 1650)
- Motto of the Royal Scots Dragoon Guards (active from 1971, but with a regimental antecedence back to 1678)
- Motto of the Royal Corps of Army Music (active from 1994)
- British Army Dirigible No 1, christened "Nulli Secundus", which first flew on 10 September 1907.

=== Affiliates ===
- Motto of 218 (Rotherham) Squadron of the Royal Air Force Air Cadets (South & West Yorkshire Wing)
- Motto of 379 (County of Ross) Squadron of the Air Training Corps (Alness, Highlands of Scotland)
- Motto of 58 (Harrogate) Squadron of the Air Training Corps (Central and East Yorkshire Wing)
- Part of the motto of the historical Royal Hong Kong Regiment (active 1854–1995) (Nulli Secundus in Oriente)
- Motto of 2353 (Ystrad Mynach) Squadron, No 1 Welsh Wing, ATC.
- Norfolk and Suffolk Wing ATC
- 2425 Nottingham Airport Squadron ATC
- 1947 Birstal Squadron ATC
- 1964 - 1966 Motto of The 201st Craft Apprentice Entry RAF Halton
- Motto of 220 (St Albans) Squadron, ATC

== Canadian Armed Forces ==
- Motto of the Governor General's Horse Guards (active from 1855)
- Motto of the Canadian Grenadier Guards (active from 1859)

== South African Defence Force ==
- Motto of the Pretoria Regiment (active from 1913)

== United States Armed Forces ==
- Motto of the 100th Aircraft Maintenance Squadron (100AMXS), 100th Air Refueling Wing, RAF Mildenhall, UK, United States Air Force
- Motto of naval destroyer USS Cowell (DD-547) (in service 1943–1971)
- Motto of the 68th Airlift Squadron (active 1943–1946; 1947–1952; 1955–present), 433d Airlift Wing (active 1949–1952; 1955–present), Lackland AFB, TX, United States Air Force
- Motto of 2nd Marine Air Wing (active from 1941), Marine Aviation Logistics Squadron 14, Marine Aircraft Group 14, Cherry Point, NC. USA
- Motto of the 52nd Combat Communications Squadron, Robins AFB, GA, United States Air Force

=== Affiliates ===
- Motto of the United States Air Force Academy, Class of 1960
- Public motto of the Sigma Nu undergraduate fraternity of the Virginia Military Institute

== Other ==
- Motto of Wallacia Rural Fire Brigade, New South Wales Rural Fire Service, Australia
- Motto of the British Triumph Owners Motor Cycle Club (founded 1949)
- Motto of the 2nd Battalion, Singapore Infantry Regiment (2SIR)
- Motto for the Valley Hockey Club Brisbane, Australia
- Motto for Wendes Artillery Regiment, Sweden (1794-2000)
- Motto of the Second District of the Milwaukee Police Department, United States
