= Operation David =

British military operation during World War II

Operation David (1940)
- Part of Battle of Belgium
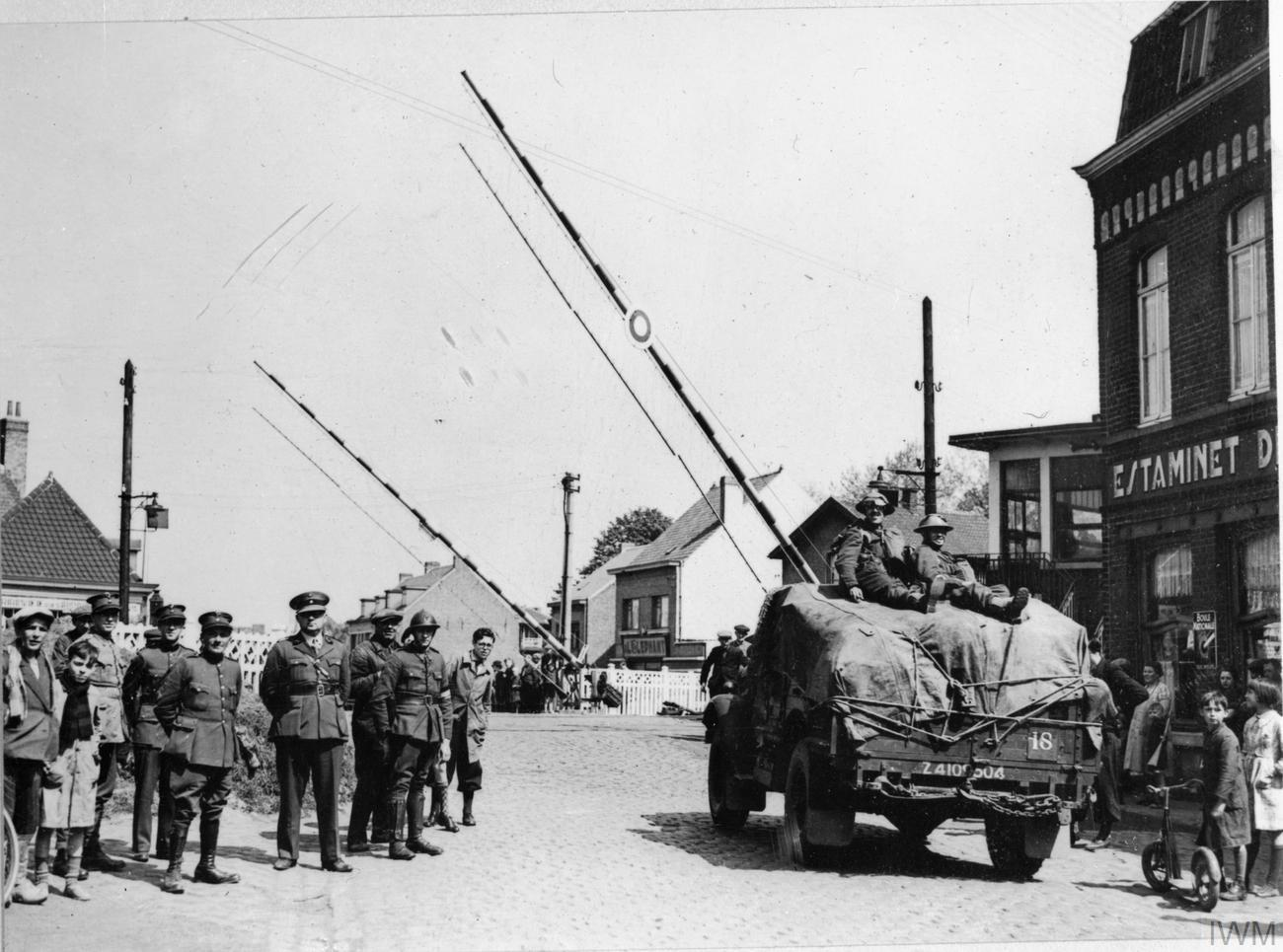
- British troops of the BEF cross the border into Belgium, 10 May 1940.
Date	10–24 May 1940
Location	Belgium
Result	German victory

Belligerents
France; United Kingdom; Belgium	Germany

Commanders and leaders
(French Third Republic) Georges Maurice Jean Blanchard; (United Kingdom) Lord Gort	(Nazi Germany) Fedor von Bock

Operation David was the code name for the advance of the British Expeditionary Force (BEF) into Belgium at the start of the Battle of Belgium during the Second World War. On the same day as the German invasion of neutral Belgium, 10 May 1940, the BEF moved forward from their defences on the Franco-Belgian border to take up a new position deep inside Belgium, conforming to French war planning 1920–1940, by Grand Quartier Général, the French high command.

Forming a defensive line with French and Belgian forces on either side, the BEF were able to contain attacks by German infantry divisions but this was a diversion; the main effort by mobile German armoured divisions was further south. To avoid encirclement, the BEF and their allies were forced into fighting retreats and ended up back at their initial border positions by 24 May. The German spearhead had reached the coast behind them, cutting them off from their supplies and leading to the Dunkirk evacuation of the Allies in the following days.

== Planning ==
In the interwar period, French military planners of Grand Quartier Général (GQG) had adopted the idea of fortifying France's borders and work on the Maginot Line had started in 1930. In 1932, it had been decided by the Conseil supérieur de la guerre that France's northeastern border should not be fortified; the low-lying land made building suitable structures technically difficult and France had been in a military alliance with Belgium since 1920. Therefore, it was decided that France could best be protected against any German aggression in the region by defending Belgium; this had the advantage that any fighting would not be on French soil, thus preserving the important industrial towns in the border area. This strategy received a setback in 1936 when Belgium declared neutrality and abandoned its military alliance with France, meaning that in the event of a German invasion, the two armies could no longer coordinate their defence plans.

The French planners had identified three possible defensive lines inside Belgium. The most obvious was along the Albert Canal which ran inside the Belgian border with Germany; however, since the declaration of neutrality, it seemed likely that French forces would only be able to move into Belgian territory after an invasion had begun, and in that case, there would be insufficient time to deploy before the line was overrun. The second alternative was the line of the River Scheldt, or Escaut in French, which ran through Ghent to Antwerp. Although a formidable natural obstacle, defending the Escaut, an option known as the Escaut Plan or "Plan E", would entail abandoning large amounts of Belgian territory to the Germans including Brussels and other major industrial areas. The final possibility was to form a line along the course of the River Dyle, known as the Dyle Plan or "Plan D". Although this would preserve more Belgian assets and was shorter than the Escaut Line, the river itself was much smaller and hardly bigger than a stream in places. Furthermore, the Dyle did not extend all the way to the River Meuse to create an unbroken line; to the east of the town of Wavre was a 40 kilometres (25 mi) plain without any natural obstacles known as the "Gembloux Gap".

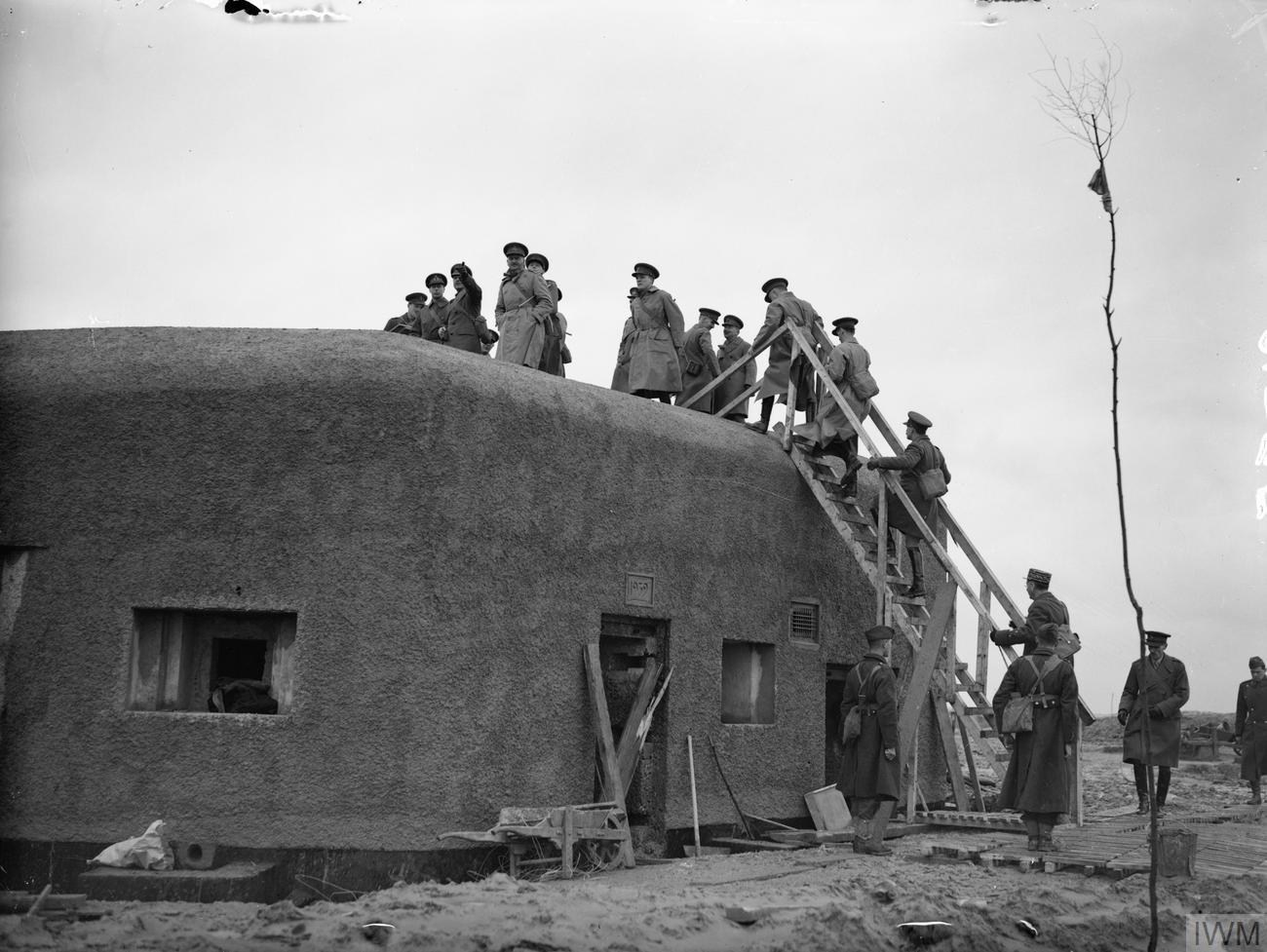
King George VI inspects the construction of the Gort Line from the top of a new pill box, December 1939.

On deployment to France in September 1939, the BEF, commanded by General Lord Gort, was incorporated into the French 1st Army Group, which was responsible for the defence of France along the Belgian and Luxembourg border from the Channel coast to the west end of the Maginot Line. Also in the group were the First Army (under Général d'armée Georges Maurice Jean Blanchard) and the Ninth Army under Général d'armée André Corap. All these forces were under the overall command of the Commander-in-Chief of the North East Front, General Georges. The section of the Franco-Belgian border to be held by the BEF stretched from Armentières westward towards Menin and then south to where the border met the River Escaut (the French name for the Scheldt) at Maulde, forming a salient around Lille and Roubaix. The British began to fortify their sector with trenches, weapons pits and pillboxes, which became known as the Gort Line.

Initially, Maurice Gamelin, the French Commander-in-Chief of the Armies, favoured Plan E, an advance to the Escaut Line and in a directive issued on 24 October 1939, he stated that an advance to the Dyle could only be considered if the 1st Army Group were able to deploy into Belgium before a German attack. Meanwhile, the Belgians had tentatively begun to fortify the Dyle Line, known to them as the K-W Line, which brought about a change in Gamelin's opinion, despite opposition from Georges who was more cautious. On 9 November, a meeting of Allied commanders at Vincennes agreed to the adoption of Plan D, an advance to the Dyle Line, which was confirmed at a meeting of the Supreme War Council on 17 November. The British were dubious about any advance in to Belgium, but given the small size of BEF in comparison to the French armies, Gort felt that he had little option but to agree.

The final version of the Dyle Plan (Plan D), known as the Breda Variant.

In January 1940, in the Mechelen incident, a German aircraft carrying their secret invasion plans crash-landed in Belgium. These plans confirmed Gamelin's suspicions that the Germans would attempt a rerun of the 1914 Schlieffen Plan by attacking through Belgium, but also revealed that they were planning to occupy part of the neutral Netherlands, a possibility which Gamelin had previously mooted. Perhaps influenced by this intelligence, in March, Gamelin revised Plan D with the "Breda Variant" in which the French Seventh Army, under Général d'armée Henri Giraud, would be removed from reserve at Rouen and placed on the border on the left of the BEF.

In an invasion, the Seventh Army would race northwards and link up with Netherlands forces at Breda, where it would protect the approaches to Antwerp. In the final version of the plan, the Belgians were expected to delay a German advance, then retire from the Albert Canal to the Dyle from Antwerp to Louvain. On the Belgian right, the BEF was to defend about 12 mi (20 km) of the Dyle from Louvain to Wavre with nine divisions and the First Army on the right of the BEF was to hold 22 mi (35 km) with ten divisions, from Wavre across the Gembloux Gap to Namur. The Ninth Army would take post south of Namur, along the Meuse to the left (northern) flank of the Second Army.

By March 1940, the BEF had doubled in size to 394,165 men since its original deployment. By May 1940 the BEF order of battle consisted of 10 infantry divisions in I Corps, II Corps and III Corps, the BEF Air Component Royal Air Force (RAF) detachment of about 500 aircraft and the Advanced Air Striking Force (AASF) long-range bomber force. These were commanded by General Headquarters (GHQ) which held a reserve of Headquarters Troops including the 5th Infantry Division, the 1st Army Tank Brigade and the 1st Light Armoured Reconnaissance Brigade, as well as artillery, signals, pioneers, supply and medical units.

== Deployment ==
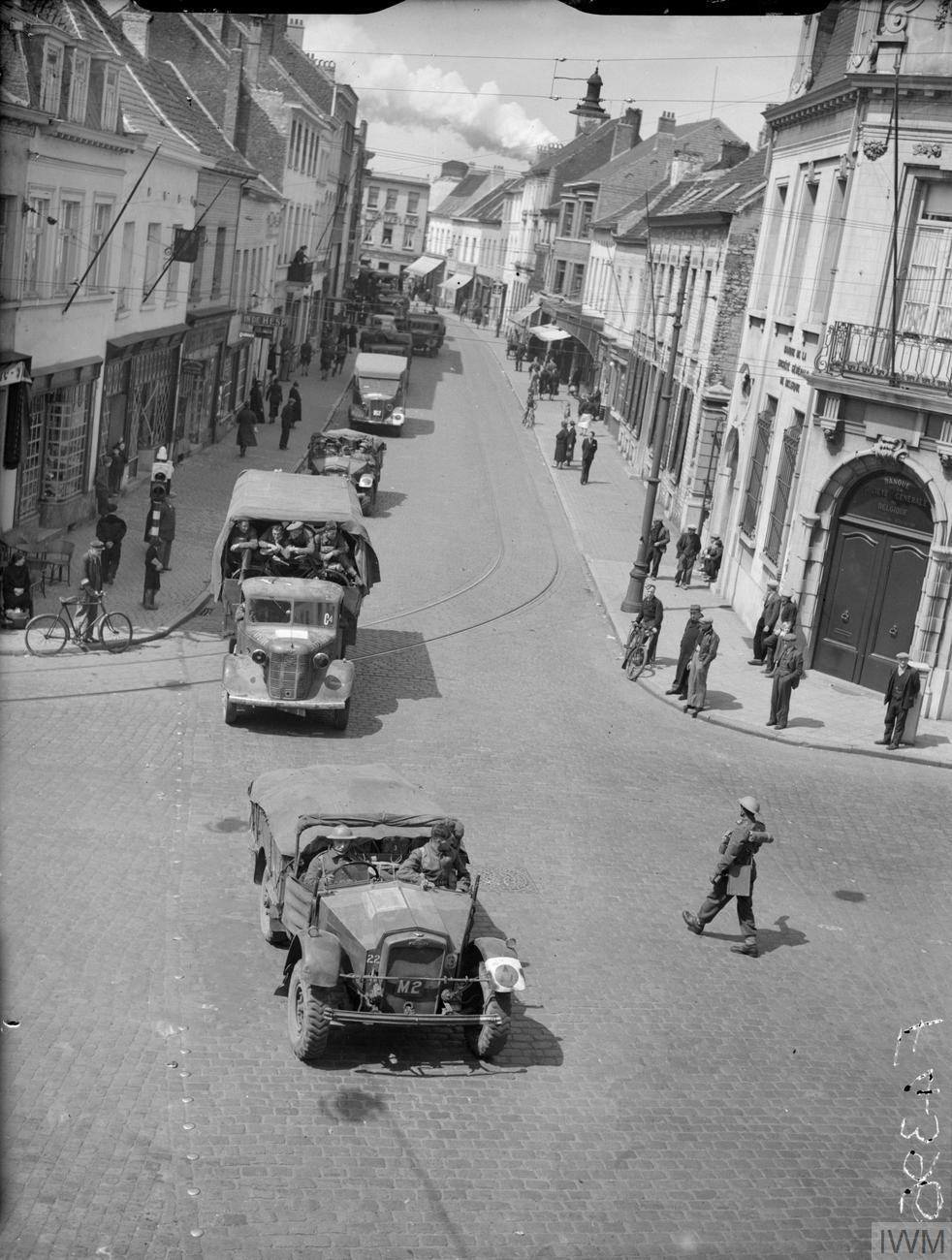
British vehicles move through Herseaux (now part of Mouscron), as the BEF crosses the border into Belgium, 10 May 1940.

From 1:00 a.m. on 10 May 1940, the French national headquarters, GQG, received information from Brussels and Luxembourg that the German invasion was about to begin, and at 4:35 a.m., the German invasion of France and the Low Countries commenced. Gamelin was woken at 6:30 a.m. and ordered the Dyle Plan to start. The code name "Operation David" initiated the British part of the Dyle Plan. The British vanguard, spearheaded by the armoured cars of the a 12th Royal Lancers, crossed the border at 1:00 p.m. on 10 May, cheered on by crowds of Belgian civilians lining their route.

The section of the Dyle which had been allocated to the BEF ran from Louvain south-west to Wavre, a distance of some 22 miles (35 kilometres). Gort had decided to man the front line with the 3rd Division from II Corps in the north with the 1st and 2nd Divisions from I Corps further south, leaving some battalions to defend a frontage double that recommended by British Army field manuals. The BEF had sufficient motor transport to move the three front line divisions in a movement intended to be completed in 90 hours, nearly four days. The remaining BEF divisions were to provide defence in depth all the way back to the River Escaut; they were required to march towards their objectives until motor transport became available.

On arrival at the riverbank to the north of Louvain, the 3rd Division found that part of their position was occupied by Belgian troops who refused to move out for their British allies, even though Brooke appealed directly to the King of the Belgians, and finally had to be directly ordered out by Georges. Those British infantry battalions posted along the bank of the Dyle began to arrive on 11 May and started to dig in; the defences that had been constructed by the Belgians amounted to only a few scattered pill boxes and some barbed wire. The preparations were protected by a screen of light tanks and Bren carriers operating on the western side of the river to keep German reconnaissance patrols away; they were withdrawn on 14 May when all the front line units were dug in and the bridges were then blown.

== Defence of the Dyle ==
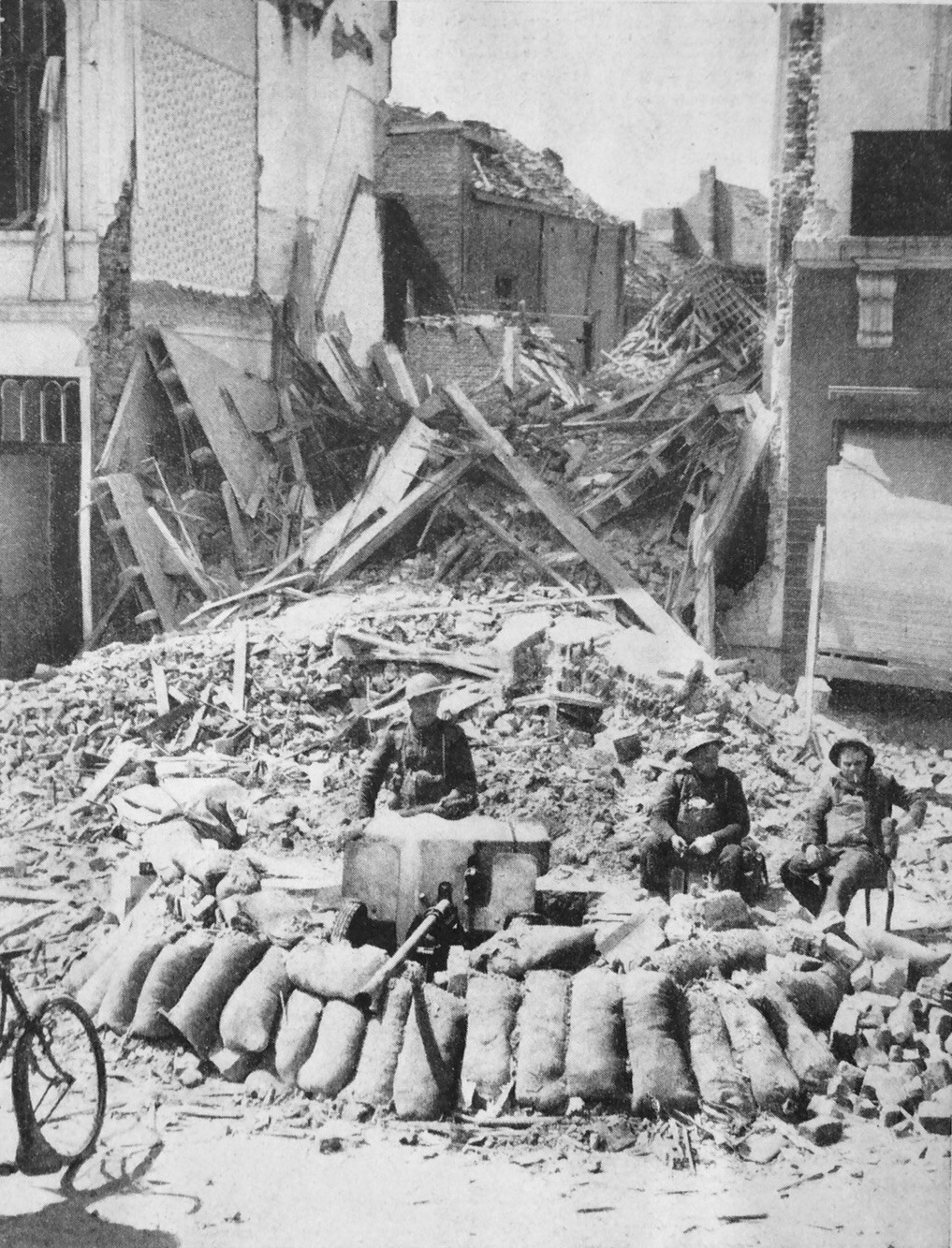
British troops with a 2-pounder anti-tank gun at a barricade in Louvain.

The first appearance of German forces on the BEF front was on the afternoon of 14 May, when reconnaissance troops of three German infantry divisions arrived in motor cars or on motorcycles. They were apparently unaware of the British positions and in several places approached the Dyle without taking cover, where they were an easy target for small arms fire and artillery. Later in the evening, parts of the line were fired on by German field guns, the first experience for many British troops of enemy fire. On 15 May, attacks on Louvain by the 19th Infantry Division were repulsed by the 3rd Division (Major General Bernard Montgomery).

On the left of the divisional flank, the 1st Grenadier Guards were forced to abandon their forward positions and withdraw behind the Dyle Canal which ran a short distance to the west of the river, but there the line held. At dawn on the following day, following a two-hour barrage, a determined attack was made on Louvain railway station and the adjacent goods yard, but after a prolonged fight, the Germans were thrown back in a counter-attack by the 1st Royal Ulster Rifles and the 1st King's Own Scottish Borderers. Further south, the River was only about 15 feet (4.6 m) wide, and while it prevented tanks from crossing, it was a less effective barrier to a determined infantry assault.

During an attack at the south of the BEF line near Wavre, 2nd Lieutenant Richard Annand of the 2nd Durham Light Infantry earned a Victoria Cross by preventing troops of the German 31st Infantry Division from crossing a demolished bridge by throwing grenades onto them and when finally ordered to withdraw, attempting to rescue a wounded soldier in a wheelbarrow. All the German bridgeheads across the Dyle were repulsed or contained by British counter-attacks. By the morning of 16 May, events far to the south had caused Gort to be ordered to withdraw the BEF back to the Escaut.

== Allies ==
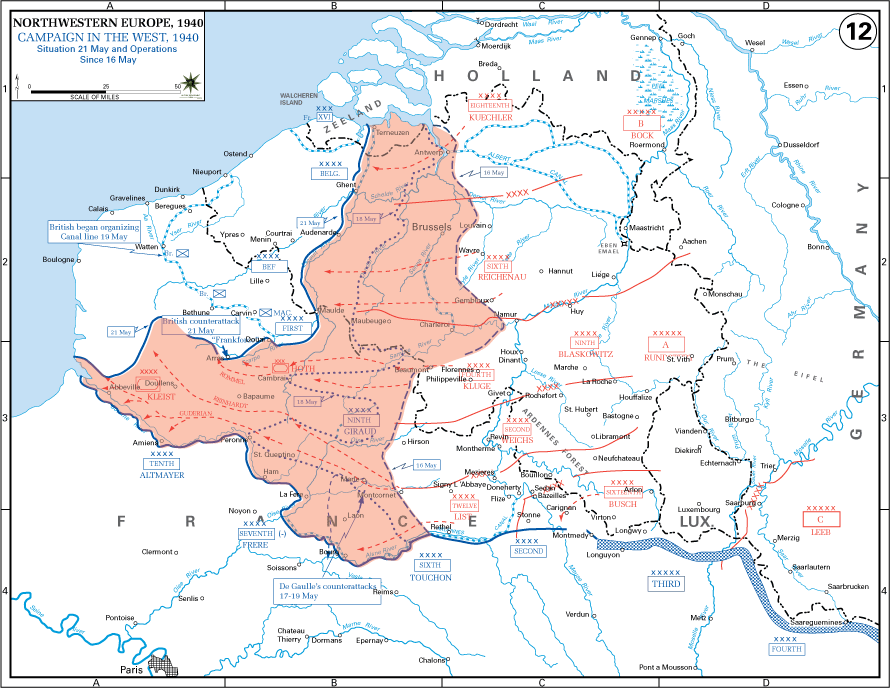
The Battle of Belgium; the situation 16–21 May 1940.

The French Seventh Army drove forward on the northern flank and advanced elements reached Breda on 11 May. They found that the Moerdijk bridges had been captured by German paratroops, cutting the link between southern and northern Holland and forcing the Dutch Army to retire north towards Amsterdam and Rotterdam. The French collided with the 9th Panzer Division and the advance of the 25e Division d'Infanterie Motorisée was stopped by German infantry, tanks and Ju 87 (Stuka) dive-bombers as the 1ère Division Légère Mécanisée was forced to retreat. (French heavy tanks were still on trains south of Antwerp.) The Breda variant had been thwarted in fewer than two days and on 12 May, Gamelin ordered the Seventh Army to cancel the plan and cover Antwerp. The Seventh Army retired from the Bergen op Zoom–Turnhout Canal Line 20 mi (32 km) from Antwerp, to Lierre 10 mi (16 km) away on 12 May; on 14 May the Dutch surrendered.

In Belgium, the Albert Canal defence line was based on the fortress of Eben-Emael and was broken in the Battle of Fort Ében-Émael when German glider troops landed on the roof and captured it by noon on 11 May; two bridges over the Maas (Meuse) were captured at Maastricht. The disaster forced the Belgian Army to retreat towards the line from Antwerp to Louvain on 12 May, far too soon for the French First Army to arrive and dig in. The French Corps de Cavalerie had reached the Gembloux Gap on 11 May and officers reported that the area had been far less fortified by the Belgians than expected. Anti-tank defences had not been built and there were no trenches or concrete fortifications; there were some Cointet-elements (steel barriers) but none of the anti-tank mines supposed to protect them. Some of the Cointet-elements were so poorly sited that a French officer asked if the Germans had been asked where to put them. Prioux tried to persuade Billotte and Georges to scrap the Dyle Plan and revert to the Escaut Plan but with the 1st Army Group moving, Georges decided against changing the plan but Blanchard was ordered to accelerate the advance of the First Army, to arrive a day early on 14 May.

On 15 May, the Wehrmacht attacked the First Army along the Dyle Line, causing the meeting engagement that Gamelin had tried to avoid. The First Army repulsed the XVI Panzer Corps during the Battle of Gembloux (14–15 May), but GQG realised too late that the attack they were facing was a diversion; the main German attack had come further south, where Army Group B had burst through the lightly defended Ardennes.

== Allied withdrawal ==
On 16 May, the 1st Army Group was ordered to retreat from the Dyle Line, to avoid being trapped by the German breakthrough against the Second and Ninth armies but on 20 May, the Germans reached Abbeville on the Channel coast, cutting off the northern armies. The plan for the BEF withdrawal was that under cover of darkness, units would thin-out their front and make a phased and orderly withdrawal before the Germans realised what was happening. The objective for the night of 16/17 May was the Charleroi to Willebroek Canal (the Line of the Senne), the following night to the River Dendre from Maubeuge to Termonde and the Escaut to Antwerp (the Dendre Line) and finally on 18/19 May, to the Escaut from Oudenarde to Maulde on the French border (the Escaut Line). The order to withdraw was greeted with astonishment and frustration by the British who felt that they had held their own. BEF training had included the complicated task of withdrawal while in contact with the enemy.

Starting at 9:00 p.m. and under the cover of an intense bombardment by the British artillery, who expended their ammunition, the withdrawal went mainly according to plan. On the far left of the British line, the situation was complicated by the early withdrawal of the neighbouring Belgians, allowing the Germans to pass around the flank of 1st Coldstream Guards and occupy the town of Herent which was on the withdrawal route; hard fighting including a bayonet charge was required to clear the road, at a cost of 120 Guards casualties. The last units to leave the line were the divisional cavalry regiments in their light tanks and carriers. A later communication breakdown caused a loss of coordination with the Belgian Army to the north-west of II Corps and a dangerous gap opened between the two; fortunately it was covered by British light armour before the Germans could discover and exploit it.

== Defence of the Escaut ==
On the British sector of the Escaut, seven BEF divisions were placed in the front line; they were from the north the 44th, 4th, 3rd, 1st, 42nd, 2nd and 48th divisions. The British divisions were facing nine German infantry divisions, who began their attack on the morning of 21 May with a devastating artillery barrage. Shortly afterwards, infantry assaults started along the whole front, crossing the canalised river either by inflatable boats or by clambering across the wreckage of demolished bridges. Although the Escaut line was penetrated in numerous places, all the German bridgeheads were either thrown back or contained by vigorous but costly British counter-attacks and the remaining German troops were ordered to retire across the river by the night of 22 May. One such British counter-attack near the village of Esquelmes, was led by Lance Corporal Harry Nicholls of 3rd Battalion, Grenadier Guards, who was taken prisoner and later awarded the Victoria Cross.

== Withdrawal to the Gort Line ==
In a meeting between Gort and his corps commanders on 22 May, it was agreed that the Escaut Line could not be held for long and a withdrawal was planned for the following night, 23/24 May. At a chaotic series of meetings at Ypres, General Maxime Weygand, who had recently taken over from Gamelin, proposed to King Leopold and Billotte a new defensive line in which the Belgians would defend the River Lys while on 23/24 May, the British would withdraw to their border defences, the Gort Line, which it was hoped would allow the BEF to attack south at the vulnerable flank of Army Group A on 26 May. Weygand had hoped that the Belgians would retire to the shorter defensive line of the River Yser as they had in 1914.

Leopold was unwilling to abandon so much of Belgium and perhaps, viewed in retrospect, indicating that he had no intention of fighting a long campaign. Although Gort knew of the meeting, a communication breakdown at his headquarters meant that he knew neither the time or the location and was finally located by Belgian staff officers. Weygand had left before Gort arrived, believing that Gort had been absent deliberately. In a final meeting, Weygand's plan was agreed without Gort being able to explain the difficulties to him. Billotte was fatally injured in a traffic accident on his way back to his headquarters, sowing further confusion.

Starting on 17 May, Gort began to improvise formations to protect the southern BEF flank from Army Group B. These forces used the canal from Gravelines on the coast through Saint-Omer, Béthune and La Bassée, known as the Canal Line. Forward of this line, the town of Arras was being held by a determined British garrison and to support them, a modest force led by Gott's only heavy armour, the 1st Army Tank Brigade, attacked south on 21 May. Although the Battle of Arras came as a shock to the Germans, it achieved little.

The withdrawal from the Escaut went smoothly on the southern end of the line, with light armour again providing an effective rearguard. In the far north, the 44th Division had difficulty contacting all their units. Since there were no radios below battalion levels and the field telephone lines had been disrupted by artillery and bombing, messages had to be sent by runners or in vehicles, many of which fell victim to German fire. For the first time in the campaign, the Germans continued to push forwards at night and the 44th Division and neighbouring 4th Division had to fight their way out.

== Aftermath ==
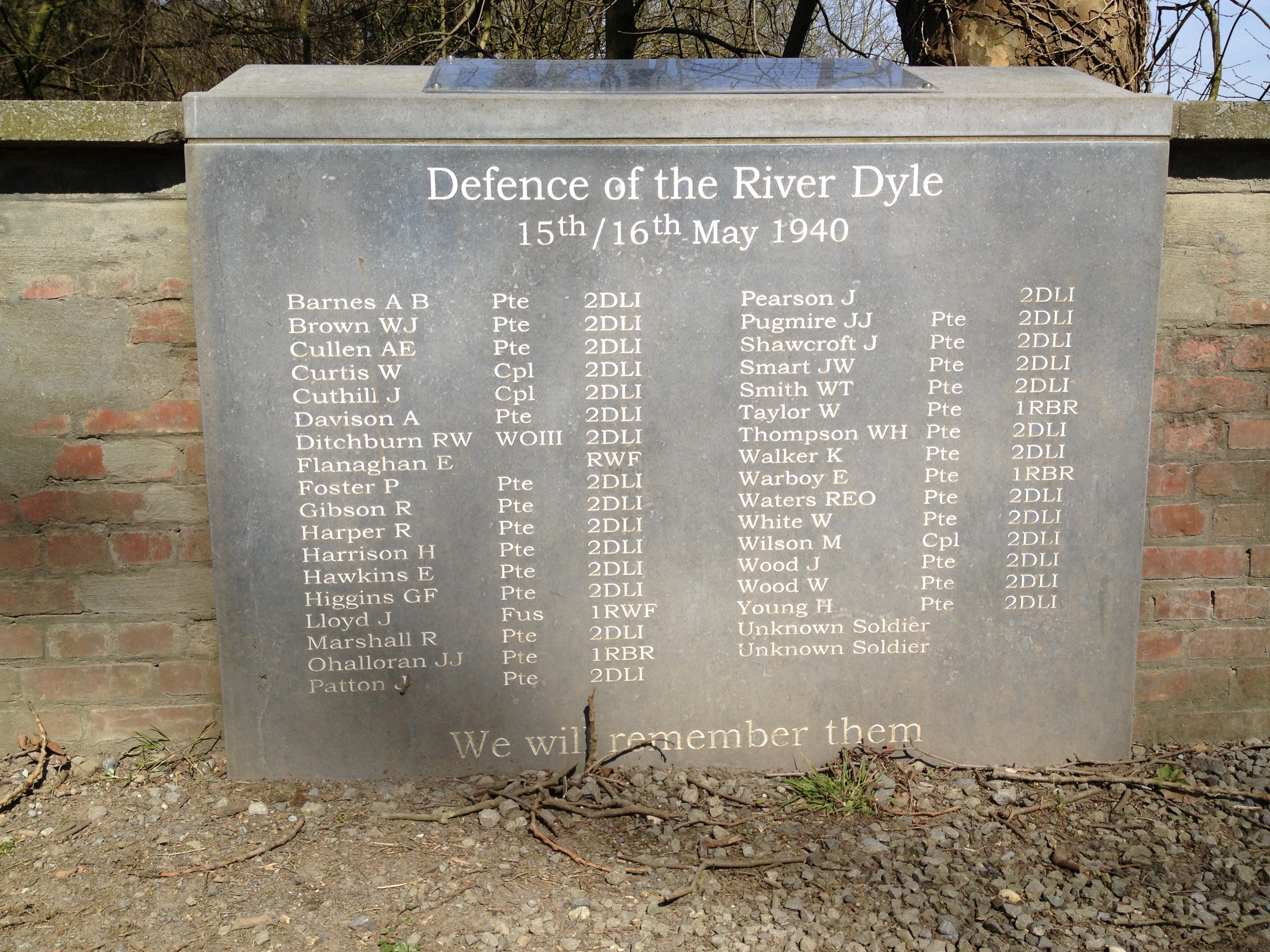
Plaque to the British soldiers who died defending the bridge over the River Dyle at Gastuche near Wavre; 15 and 16 May 1940.

On 24 May, the BEF was back where it had started, but now had the enemy behind them as well as in front and were cut off from their supplies; troops had gone on half-rations on the previous day. Much of the RAF Air Component had been withdrawn to England, making the provision of air support even more difficult, much of which had been diverted to Boulogne and Calais. The superior frontier defences allowed Gort to move the 2nd and 48th Divisions towards Lille to reinforce the defence of the Canal Line.

On 25 May, with the need to evacuate being evident, II Corps was ordered to form a defensive line on the Ypres-Comines Canal, to create a protected corridor along which the main body of the BEF could withdraw towards the coast, the start of the Battle of Dunkirk. The battle honours awarded to participating regiments during Operation David in Belgium include: "Northwest Europe 1940", "Dyle", "Withdrawal to the Escaut" and "Defence of Escaut".
