= Coldstream Guards =

Infantry regiment of the British Army

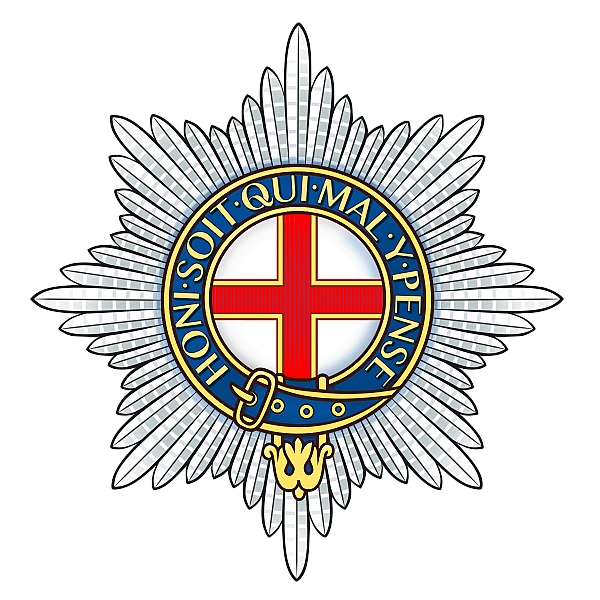
- Regimental badge of the Coldstream Guards (Note: The breast star of the Order of the Garter.)
- Active: 1650–present
- Country: Commonwealth of England (1650–1660); England (1660–1707); Great Britain (1707–1800); United Kingdom (1801–present)
- Branch: British Army
- Type: Infantry
- Role: 1st Battalion and No 17 Company – Light Role Infantry; No 7 Company – Public Duties
- Size: One battalion – 559 personnel One independent incremental company One reserve company
- Part of: Guards and Parachute Division
- Garrison/HQ: RHQ – London; 1st Battalion—Windsor; No 7 Company—London; No 17 Company Hammersmith
- Nickname: The Lilywhites
- Mottos: Nulli Secundus (Latin for 'Second to None')
- March: Quick: "Milanollo"; Slow: "Figaro" ("Non più andrai" from The Marriage of Figaro)
- Anniversaries: St George's Day (23 April)
- Engagements: English Civil War; Monmouth Rebellion; War of the Spanish Succession; War of the Austrian Succession; Seven Years' War; American War of Independence; Napoleonic Wars; Crimean War; Second Boer War; World War I; World War II; Malayan Emergency; Mau Mau Uprising; Cyprus Emergency; The Troubles; Gulf War; Bosnia; Iraq War; Operation Herrick

Commanders
- Colonel-in-Chief: King Charles III
- Colonel of the Regiment: Lt Gen Sir James Bucknall
- Regimental Lieutenant Colonel: Col. Toby P. O. Till

Insignia
- Tactical Recognition Flash
- Plume: Red; Right side of Bearskin cap
- Abbreviation: COLDM GDS

The Coldstream Guards is the oldest continuously serving regular (Note: The Honourable Artillery Company, a reserve unit, being the oldest continuously serving regiment in the British Army as a whole.) regiment in the British Army. As part of the Household Division, one of its principal roles is the protection of the monarchy; due to this, it often participates in state ceremonial occasions. The Regiment has consistently provided formations on deployments around the world and has fought in the majority of the major conflicts in which the British Army has been engaged.

The Regiment has been in continuous service and has never been amalgamated. It was formed in 1650 as Monck's Regiment of Foot through the amalgamation of five companies each from Colonel George Fenwick's Regiment of Foot (raised in 1648 for Parliament during the Second English Civil War) and Sir Arthur Haselrig's Regiment of Foot (raised in 1643 for Parliament during the First English Civil War), 10 companies in total, and was then renamed the Lord General's Regiment of Foot Guards after the Restoration in 1660. With George Monck's death in 1670 it was again renamed the Coldstream Regiment of Foot Guards after the location in Scotland from which it marched to help restore the monarchy in 1660. Its name was again changed to the Coldstream Guards in 1855 and this is still its present title.

Today, the Regiment consists of: Regimental Headquarters, a single battalion (1st Battalion), an independent incremental company (Number 7 Company, maintaining the customs and traditions of the 2nd Battalion), a Regimental Band, a reserve company (Number 17 Company) and individuals at training establishments and other extra regimental employment.

== History ==
=== English Civil War ===
The origin of the Coldstream Guards lies in the English Civil War when Oliver Cromwell gave Colonel George Monck permission to form his own regiment as part of the New Model Army. Monck took men from Colonel George Fenwick's Regiment of Foot (raised in 1648 for Parliament during the Second English Civil War) and Sir Arthur Haselrig's Regiment of Foot (raised in August 1643 for Parliament during the First English Civil War), five companies from each, and on 13 August 1650 formed Monck's Regiment of Foot. Less than two weeks later, this force took part in the Battle of Dunbar, at which the Roundheads defeated the forces of Charles Stuart, the future King Charles II.

After Richard Cromwell's abdication, Monck gave his support to the Stuarts, and on 1 January 1660 he crossed the River Tweed into England at the village of Coldstream, from where he made a five-week march to London. He arrived in London on 2 February and helped in the Restoration of the monarchy. For his help, Monck was given the Order of the Garter and his regiment was assigned to keep order in London. However, the new parliament soon ordered his regiment to be disbanded along with all of the other regiments of the New Model Army.

Before that could happen, Parliament was forced to rely on the help of the regiment against the rebellion by the Fifth Monarchists led by Thomas Venner on 6 January 1661. The regiment defeated the rebels and on 14 February the men of the regiment symbolically laid down their arms as part of the New Model Army and were immediately ordered to take them up again as a royal regiment named The Lord General's Regiment of Foot Guards, a part of the Household Troops.

The regiment was placed as the second senior regiment of Household Troops, as it entered the service of the Crown after the 1st Regiment of Foot Guards, but it answered to that by adopting the motto Nulli Secundus (Second to None) as the regiment is older than the senior regiment. The regiment always stands on the left of the line when on parade with the rest of the Foot Guards, so standing "second to none". When Monck died in 1670, the Earl of Craven took command of the regiment and it adopted a new name, the Coldstream Regiment of Foot Guards.

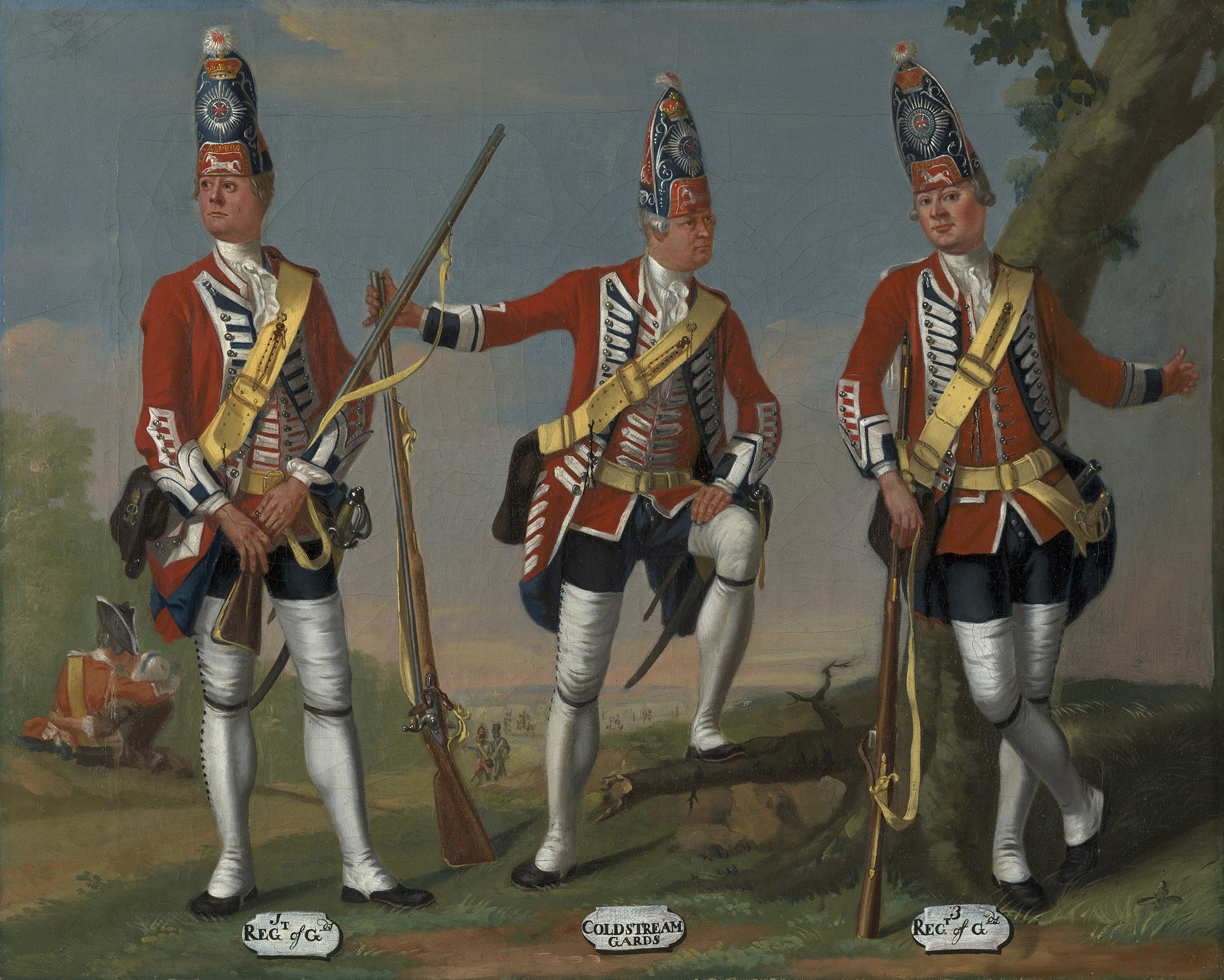
c. 1751–1760 portrait of a regimental grenadier (centre)

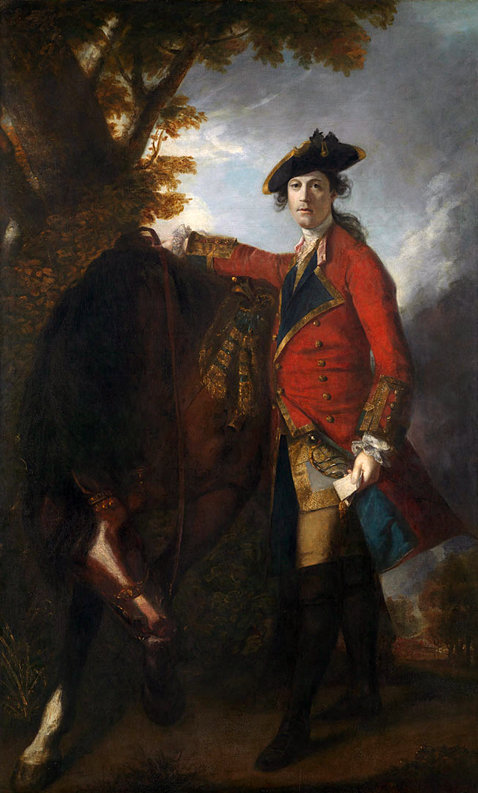
Portrait of Robert Orme by Sir Joshua Reynolds, 1756

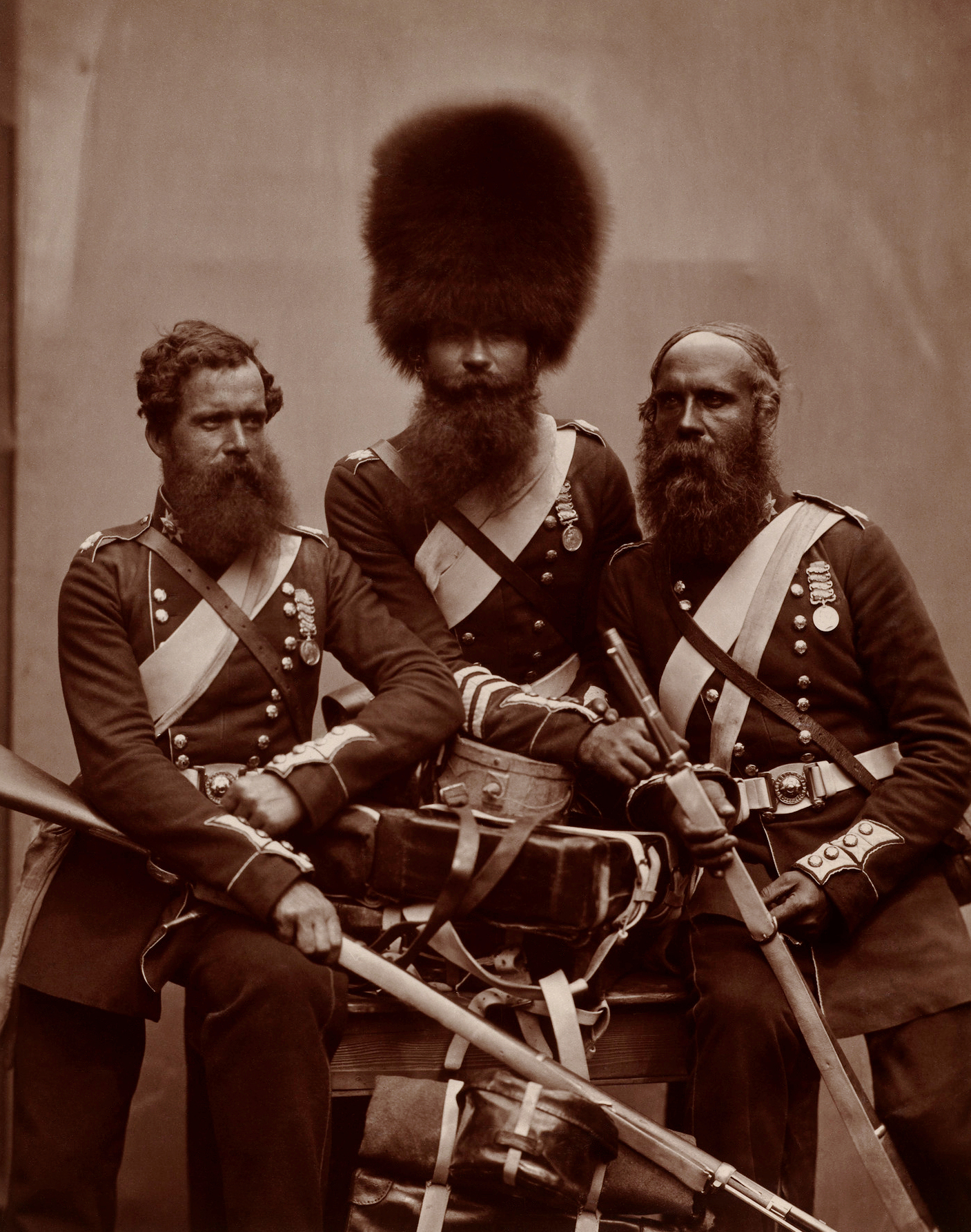
Three regimental soldiers who served in the Crimean War

=== Overseas service (1685–1900) ===
The regiment saw active service in Flanders and in the Monmouth Rebellion, including the decisive Battle of Sedgemoor in 1685. It fought in the Battle of Walcourt in 1689, the Battle of Landen and the Siege of Namur. In 1760, the 2nd Battalion was sent to Germany to campaign under Prince Ferdinand of Brunswick and fought in the Battle of Wilhelmstal and at the Castle of Amöneburg. Three Guards companies of 307 men under Coldstream commander Colonel Edward Mathew fought in the American Revolutionary War.

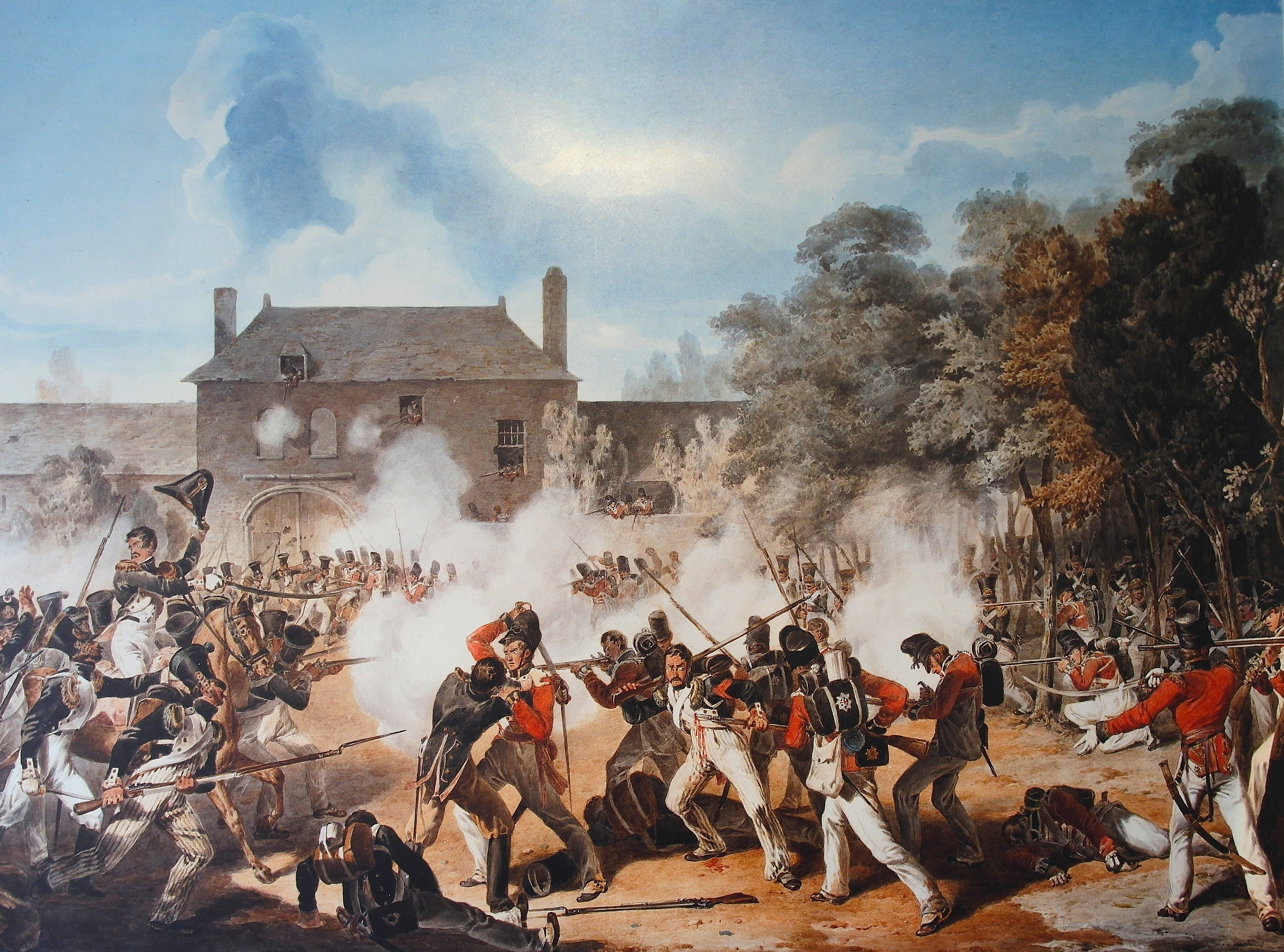
The Coldstream Guards (right) defending Hougoumont at the Battle of Waterloo

The Coldstream Regiment saw extensive service in the wars against the French Revolution and in the Napoleonic Wars. Under the command of Sir Ralph Abercromby, it defeated French troops in Egypt. In 1807, it took part in the investment of Copenhagen. In January 1809, it sailed to Portugal to join the forces under Sir Arthur Wellesley. In 1814, it took part in the Battle of Bayonne, in France, where a cemetery keeps their memory. The 2nd Battalion joined the Walcheren Expedition. Later, it served as part of the 2nd Guards Brigade in the Chateau Hougoumont where they resisted French assaults all day during the Battle of Waterloo. This defence is considered one of the greatest achievements of the regiment, and an annual ceremony of "Hanging the Brick" is performed each year in the Sergeants' Mess to commemorate the efforts of Cpl James Graham and Lt-Col James Macdonnell, who shut the North Gate after a French attack. The Duke of Wellington himself declared after the battle that "the success of the battle turned upon closing the gates at Hougoumont".

The regiment was later part of the British occupation forces of Paris until 1816.

During the Crimean War, the Coldstream Regiment fought in the battles of Alma, Inkerman and Sevastopol. On its return, four men of the regiment were awarded the newly instituted Victoria Cross.

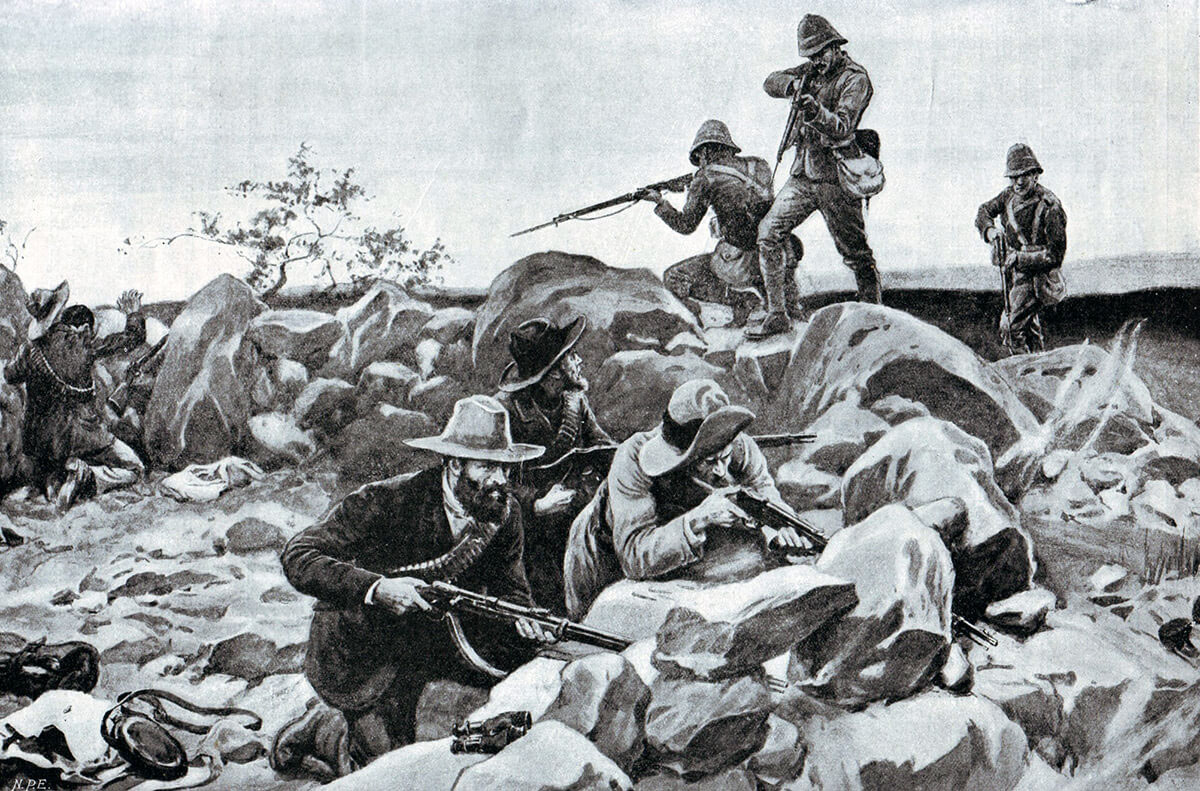
1st Coldstream Guards at the Battle of Belmont, 1899

The regiment received its current name, the Coldstream Guards, in 1855. In 1882, it was sent to Egypt against the rebels of Ahmed 'Urabi and in 1885 in the Suakin Campaign. In 1897, the Coldstreamers were reinforced with the addition of a 3rd battalion. The 1st and 2nd battalions were dispatched to South Africa at the outbreak of the Second Boer War. During the conflict, they would prove instrumental at the Battle of Belmont, and were also present at Graspan, Modder River, Enslin Station, and Magersfontein. The unit suffered heavily during that battle, losing 88 officers and men, including Major the Marquess of Winchester. The Coldstream Guards were also involved at the battles of Driefontein, Sand River, Diamond Hill, Belfast, and were also involved in hunting Christiaan de Wet.

=== 1900–present ===
At the outbreak of the First World War, the Coldstream Guards was among the first British regiments to arrive in France after Britain declared war on Germany. In the following battles, it suffered heavy losses, in two cases losing all of its officers. At the First Battle of Ypres, the 1st battalion was virtually annihilated: by 1 November down to 150 men and the Lt Quartermaster. The regiment fought at Mons, Loos, the Somme, Ginchy and in the 3rd Battle of Ypres. The regiment also formed the 4th (Pioneer) Battalion, which was disbanded after the war, in 1919. The 5th Reserve battalion never left Britain before it was disbanded.

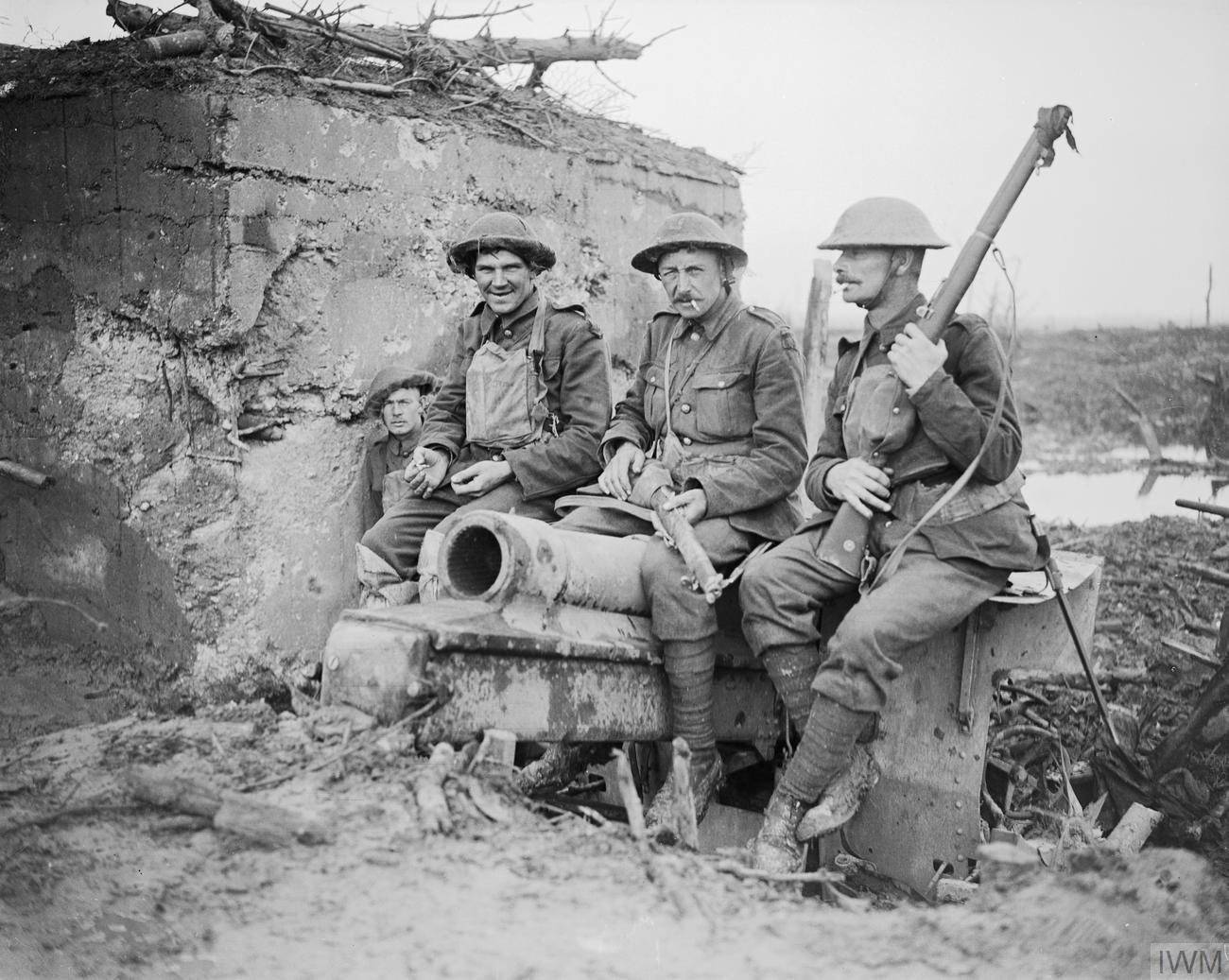
4th Coldstream Guards during the Battle of Passchendaele, 1917.

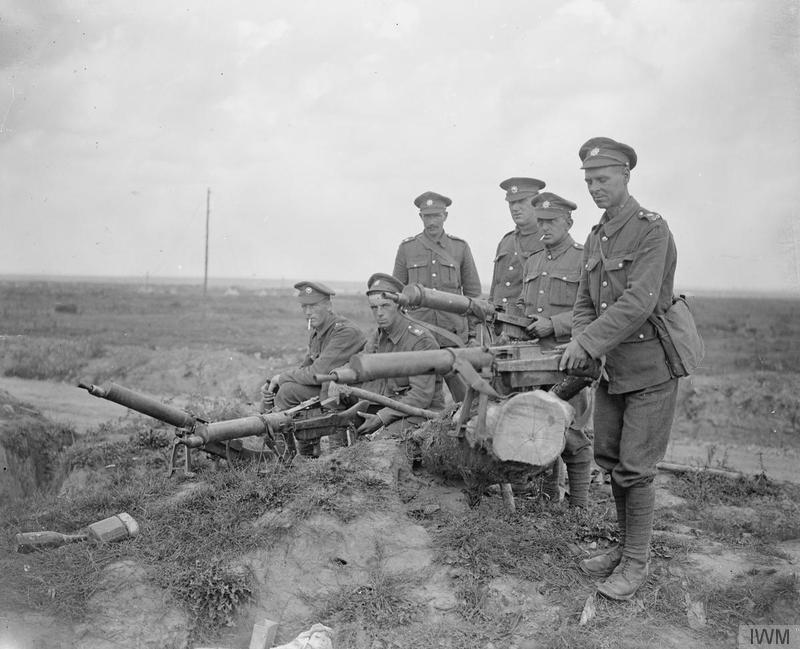
Men of the Coldstream Guards with captured German MG 08/15 machine guns at Noreuil, France, 6 September 1918.

Officers of the Coldstream Guards in the First World War.

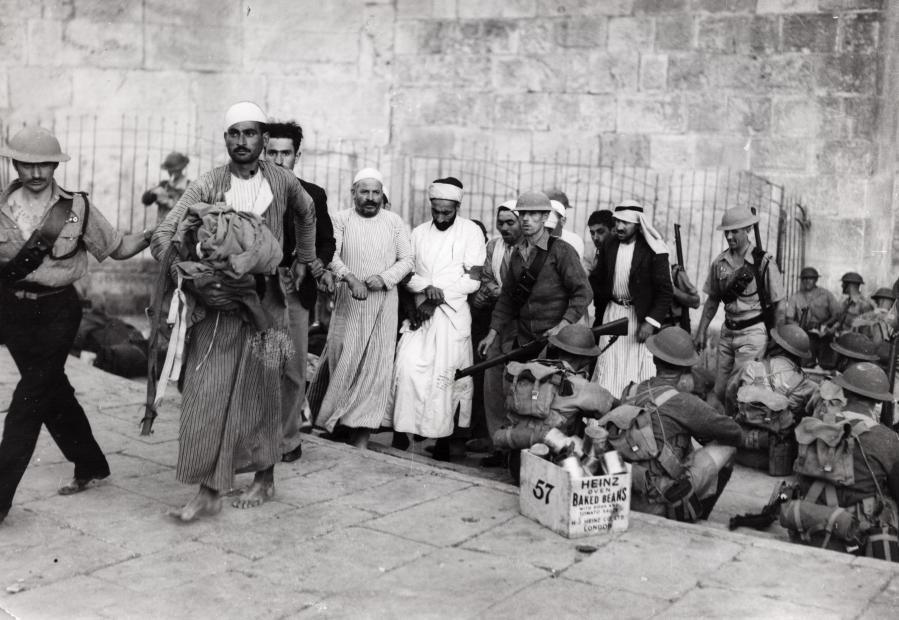
Soldiers of the English Coldstream Guards arresting Arabs insurgents in Jerusaleme in 1938 during the Great Revolt

When the Second World War began, the 1st and 2nd battalions of the Coldstream Guards were part of the British Expeditionary Force (BEF) in France; whilst the 3rd Battalion was on overseas service in the Middle East. Additional 4th and 5th battalions were also formed for the duration of the war. They fought extensively, as part of the Guards Armoured Division, in North Africa and Europe as dismounted infantry. The 4th battalion first became a motorized battalion in 1940 and then an armoured battalion in 1943. The First and Second battalions were part of the 5th Guards Armoured Brigade, and landed in Normandy on 1 July 1944; they subsequently were involved in the Battle of Caen, the Liberation of Brussels, Operation Market Garden, the Battle of the Bulge, Operation Veritable, Operation Plunder, and the Battle of Hamburg.

Coldstreamers gave up their tanks at the end of the war, the new battalions were disbanded, and the troops distributed to the 1st and 2nd Guard Training Battalions.

After the war, the 1st and 3rd battalions served in Palestine. The 2nd battalion served in the Malayan Emergency. The 3rd battalion was placed in suspended animation in 1959. The remaining battalions served during the Mau Mau rebellion from 1959 to 1962, in Aden in 1964, in Mauritius in 1965, in the Turkish invasion of Cyprus in 1974 and several times in Northern Ireland after 1969.

The Regimental Band of the Coldstream Guards was the first act on stage at the Wembley leg of the 1985 Live Aid charity concert. It played for the Prince and Princess of Wales.

In 1991, the 1st battalion was dispatched to the first Gulf War, where it was involved in prisoner of war handling and other roles. In 1993, due to defence cutbacks, the 2nd battalion was placed in suspended animation.

For much of the 1990s, the 1st Battalion was stationed in Münster, Germany, in the Armoured Infantry Role with Warrior APCs as part of the 4th Armoured Brigade. In 1993–1994, the battalion served as an armoured infantry battalion in peacekeeping duties in Bosnia as part of UNPROFOR.

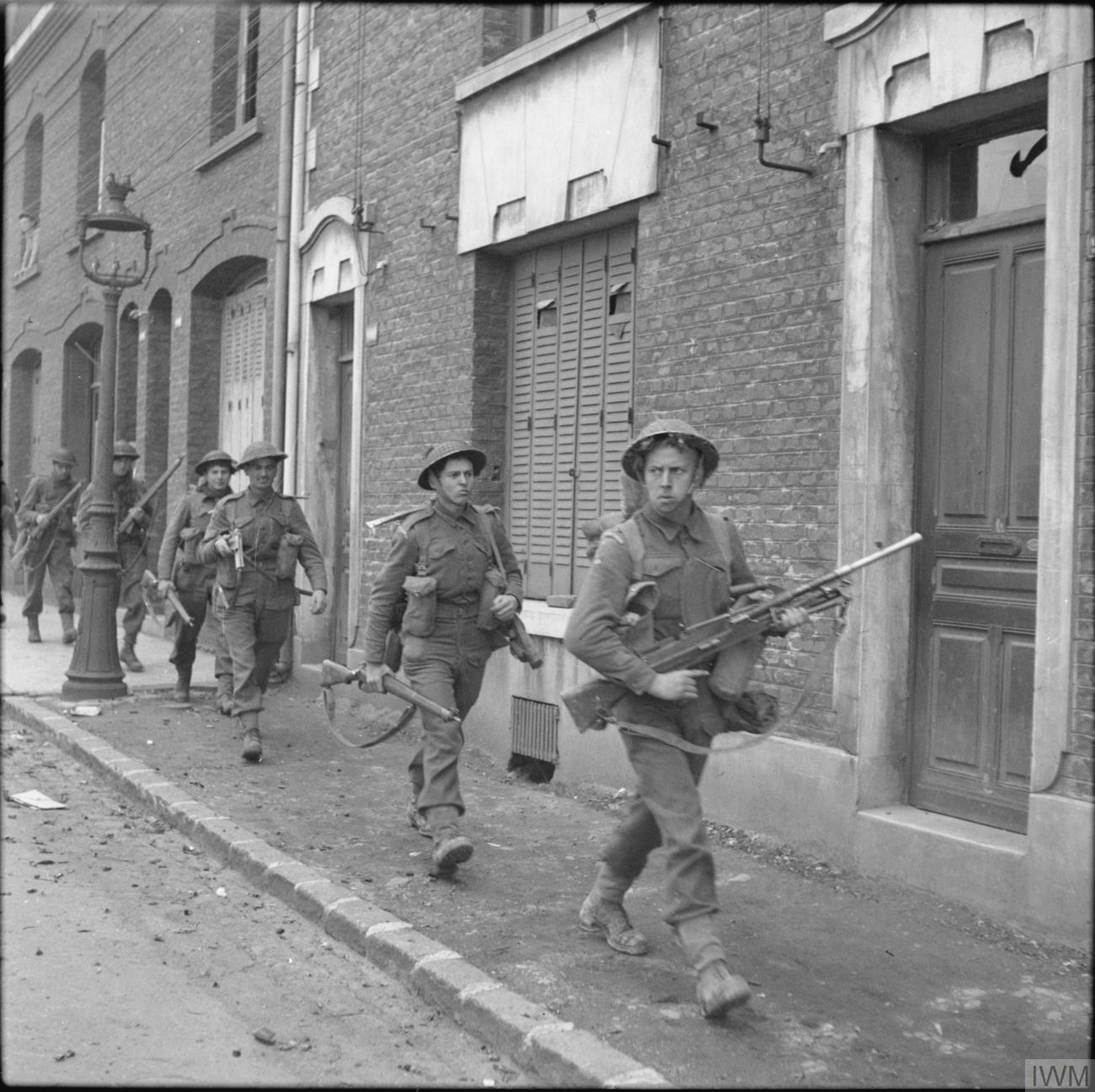
World War II – 5th Coldstream Guards enter Arras, 1 September 1944

The battalion was posted to Derry, Northern Ireland, on a two-year deployment in 2001. It then deployed to Iraq in April 2005 for a six-month tour with the rest of 12th Mechanised Brigade, based in the south of the country. The battalion lost two of its soldiers, on 2 May, near Al Amarah and on 18 October at Basra.

Des Browne, Secretary of State for Defence, announced on 19 July 2007 that in October 2007 the battalion was to be sent to Afghanistan as part of 52 Infantry Brigade.

In October 2009, the battalion was deployed on Operation Herrick 11, with units deploying to the Babaji area of central Helmand Province, Afghanistan, playing a major role in Operation Moshtarak in February 2010.

Before the Strategic Defence and Security Review 2010 the battalion was part of the 12th Mechanised Brigade in a light infantry role. Under Army 2020 it transferred to London District as a public duties battalion, then in 2019 it joined the 11th Infantry Brigade and Headquarters South East. It will move to 4 Light Brigade Combat Team by 2025.

== Regiment ==
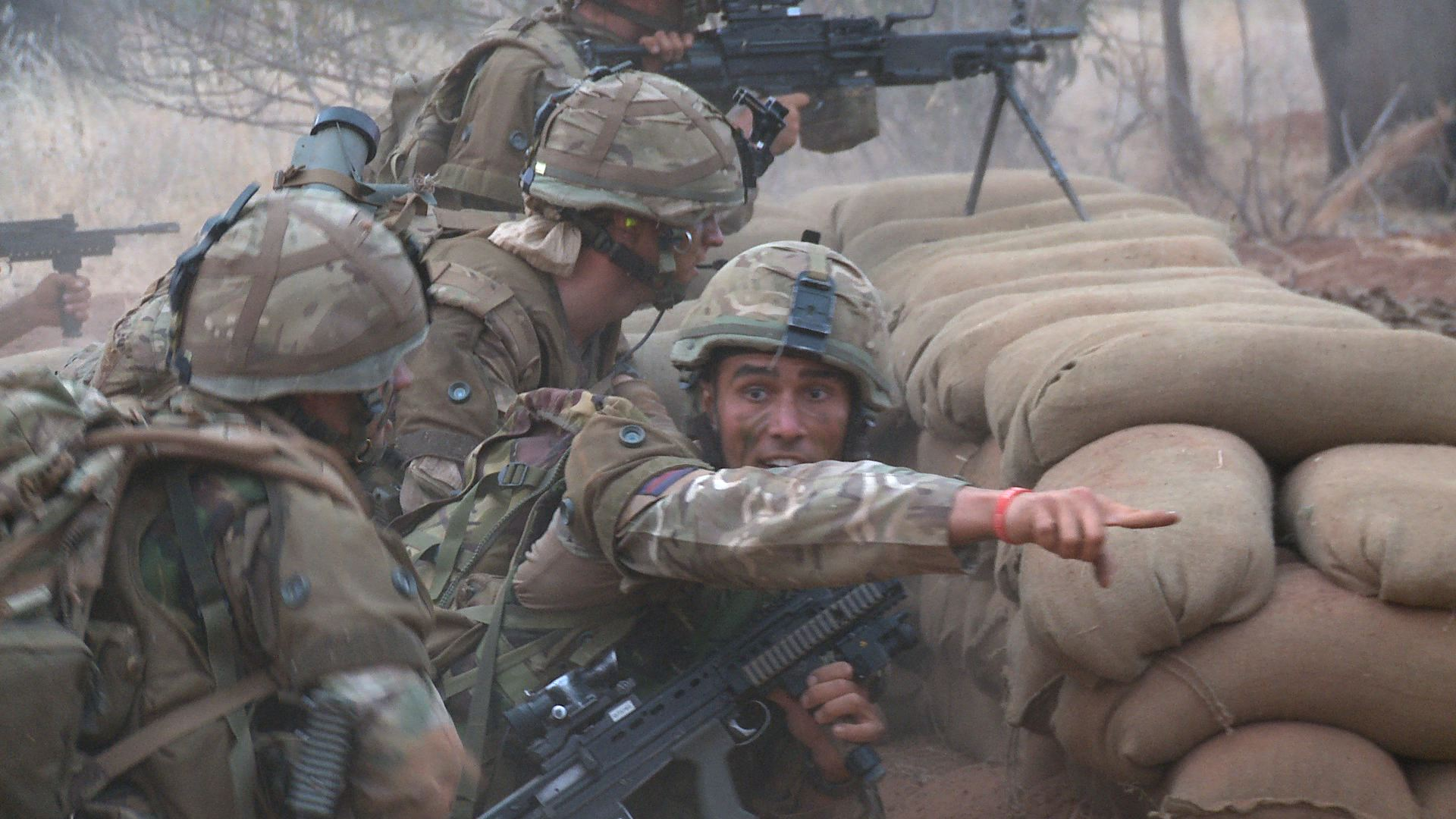
Coldstream Guards on exercise in 2013.

=== Structure ===
The structure of the regiment and affiliated band includes:

- Regimental Headquarters, at Wellington Barracks, London
- 1st Battalion, at Victoria Barracks, Windsor (Light Infantry part of 11th Infantry Brigade and Headquarters South East)
  - Battalion Headquarters
  - Headquarters Company
  - No. 1 Company (Senior Company)
  - No. 2 Company
  - No. 3 Company
  - Support (No. 4) Company (includes Corps of Drums)
- No. 7 Company, based at Wellington Barracks, London (maintaining the traditions and colours of the old 2nd Battalion placed in suspended animation in 1993)
- No. 17 Company, based at Hammersmith (the regiment's reserve unit, administered as part of 1st Battalion, London Guards).
- Band of the Coldstream Guards, based at Wellington Barracks, London, part of the Royal Corps of Army Music.

Companies that make up the regiment are traditionally numbered. New officers destined for the regiment that are at Sandhurst or at the Infantry Battle School form No. 13 Coy, while Guardsmen under training at ITC Catterick make up No. 14 Coy. No. 7 Coy is one of the incremental companies formed to undertake public duties in London and Windsor, and maintains the Colours and traditions of the former 2nd Battalion.

== Role ==
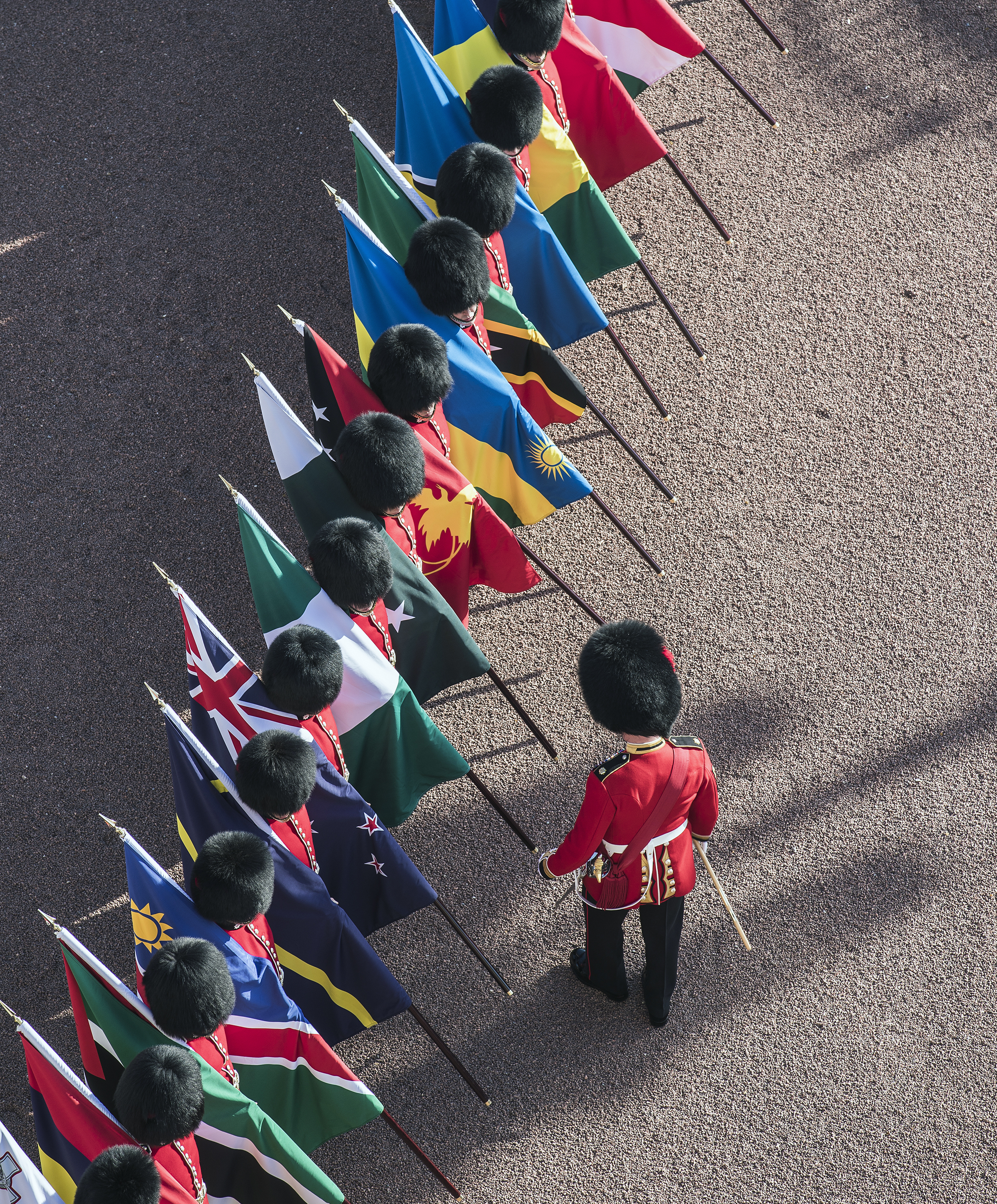
The 1st Battalion Coldstream Guards acting as Flag Bearers in the forecourt of Buckingham Palace

Currently, the most prominent role of the 1st Battalion and No. 7 Company is the performance of ceremonial duties in London and Windsor as part of the Household Division. The 1st Battalion is based in Windsor at Victoria Barracks as an operational light infantry battalion.

In 2027 the 1st Battalion will take over a security force assistance role from 1st Battalion Irish Guards.

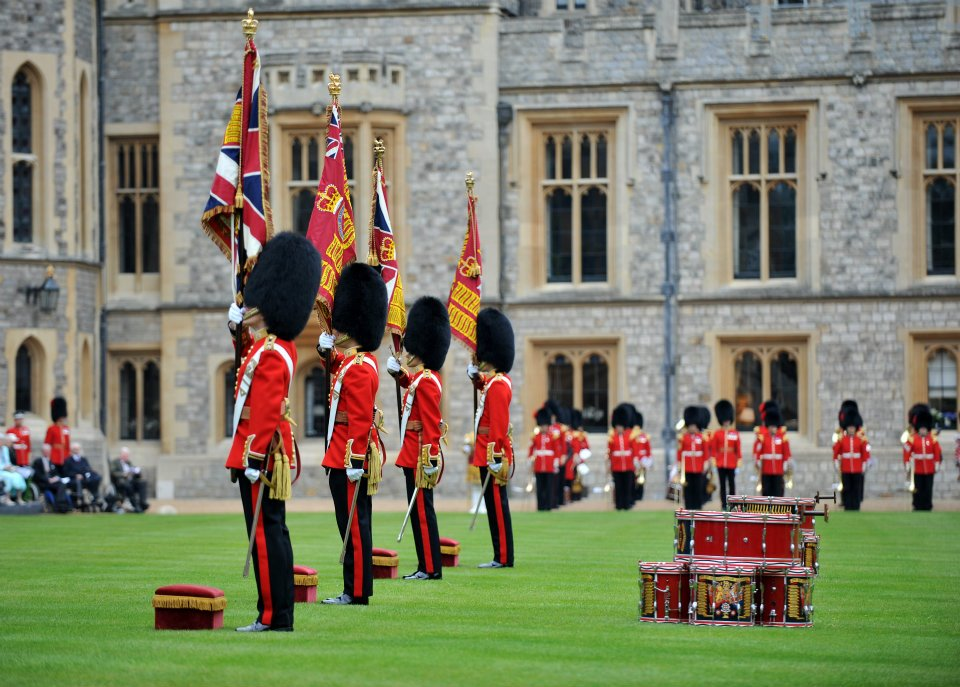
The Coldstream Guards laying up their old Colours and receiving the new Colours from The Queen

The Corps of Drums, in addition to their ceremonial role, which has been primarily the musical accompaniment of Changing of the Guard for Windsor Castle, has the role of machine gun platoon. All Guardsmen for public duties wear the 'Home Service' Dress tunic in summer or greatcoat in winter and bearskin with a red plume. The Band of the Coldstream Guards plays at Changing of The Guard, state visits and many other events.

Unlike the other four regiments of foot guards, which recruit from each of the four home nations, the Coldstream Guards has a specific recruiting area, which encompasses the counties that Monck's Regiment passed through on its march from Coldstream to London. The traditional recruiting area of the Coldstream Guards is the South West and North East of England.

The Coldstream Guards and other Guards Regiments have a long-standing connection to The Parachute Regiment. Guardsmen who have completed P Company have the option of being posted to the Guards Parachute Platoon, 3 PARA, still keeping the tradition of the No. 1 (Guards) Independent Parachute Company, which was the original Pathfinder Group of 16th Parachute Brigade, now renamed 16th Air Assault Brigade.

== Traditions ==
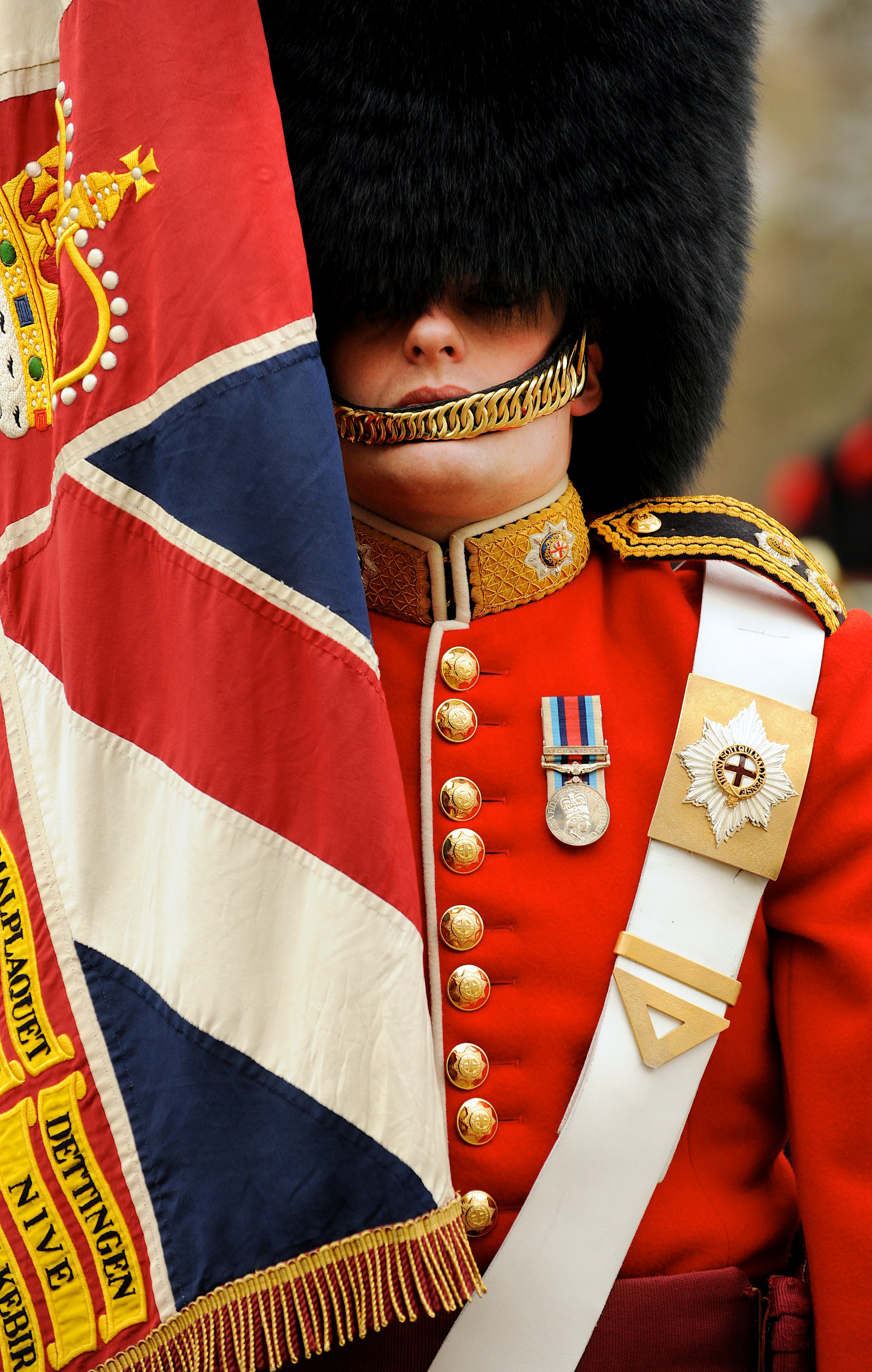
Lieutenant of the Coldstream Guards with the Regimental Colours.

The grouping of buttons on the tunic is a common way to distinguish between the regiments of Foot Guards. Coldstream buttons are arranged in pairs, and a Star of the Garter is marked on their brassware. The Coldstream Guards can also be distinguished from the other Foot Guards by the presence of a red plume (hackle) on the right side of their bearskins.

The regiment is ranked second in the order of precedence, behind the Grenadier Guards. The regiment have the motto Nulli Secundus (Second to None), which is a play on the fact that the regiment was originally the "Second Regiment of Foot Guards", a position they have never accepted as the regiment is older than the Grenadier Guards.

The regiment's nickname is Lilywhites. An ordinary soldier of the regiment is called a Guardsman, a designation granted by King George V after the First World War. The regiment is always referred to as the Coldstream, never as the Coldstreams; likewise, a member of the regiment is referred to as a Coldstreamer.

== Training ==
Recruits to the Guards Division go through an intensive training programme at the British Army's Infantry Training Centre (ITC). Their training is two weeks longer than the programme provided for recruits to the Regular line infantry regiments of the British Army; the extra training, carried out throughout the course, is devoted to drill and ceremonies.

== Colonels-in-Chief ==
King Edward VII assumed the colonelcy-in-chief of the regiment on his accession, and subsequent monarchs have also been colonel-in-chief.

- 1901–1910: King Edward VII
- 1915–1936: King George V
- Jan 1936–Dec 1936: King Edward VIII
- 1936–1952: King George VI
- 1952–2022: Queen Elizabeth II
- 2022–present: King Charles III

== Regimental Colonels ==
Duke of Abermarle's Regiment of Foot (1650)

- 1650–1661: Captain-General George Monck, 1st Duke of Albemarle

Lord General's Regiment of Foot Guards (1661)

- 1661–1670: Captain-General George Monck, 1st Duke of Albemarle

Coldstream Regiment of Foot Guards (1670)

- 1670–1678: Captain-General George Monck, 1st Duke of Albemarle
- 1678–1689: Lieutenant General William Craven, 1st Earl of Craven
- 1689–1694: Lieutenant General Thomas Tollemache
- 1694–1702: Lieutenant General John Cutts, 1st Baron Cutts
- 1702–1714: General Charles Churchill
- 1714–1722: Lieutenant General William Cadogan, 1st Earl Cadogan
- 1722–1740: Colonel Richard Lumley, 2nd Earl of Scarbrough
- 1740–1742: Field Marshal Prince William, Duke of Cumberland
- 1742–1744: Colonel Charles Spencer, 3rd Duke of Marlborough
- 1744–1755: Lieutenant General Willem van Keppel, 2nd Earl of Albemarle
- 1755–1773: Lieutenant General James O'Hara, 2nd Baron Tyrawley
- 1773–1784: General John Waldegrave, 3rd Earl Waldegrave
- 1784–1805: Field Marshal Prince Frederick, Duke of York and Albany
- 1805–1850: Field Marshal Prince Adolphus, Duke of Cambridge
- 1850–1860: Field Marshal John Byng, 1st Earl of Strafford

Coldstream Guards (1855)

- 1860–1863: Field Marshal Colin Campbell, 1st Baron Clyde
- 1863–1875: Field Marshal Sir William Maynard Gomm
- 1875–1884: General Sir William Codrington
- 1884–1890: General Sir Thomas Montagu Steele
- 1890–1892: General Sir Arthur Edward Hardinge
- 1892–1911: General Sir Frederick Stephenson
- 1911–1915: General William Seymour
- 1915–1918: Major General Evelyn Boscawen, 7th Viscount Falmouth
- 1918–1945: Lieutenant General Sir Alfred Codrington
- 1945–1962: General Sir Charles Loyd
- 1962–1994: Major General Sir George Burns
- 1994–1999: Lieutenant General Sir William Rous
- 1999–2009: General Sir Michael Rose
- 2009–present: Lieutenant General Sir James Bucknall

== Regimental Lieutenant Colonels ==
The Regimental Lieutenant Colonels have included:

- 1650–1659: William Gough
- 1659–1665: Ethelbert Morgan
- 1665–1681: Sir James Smyth
- 1682–1688: Major General Edward Sackville
- 1688–1691: Edward Dalby
- 1691–1692: James Bridgeman
- 1692–1694: William Seymour
- 1694–1702: William Matthew
- 1702–1704: William Mathew
- 1704–1715: Maj. Gen. Edward Braddock
- 1715–1717: Maj. Gen. Richard Holmes
- 1717–1733: Sir Adolphus Oughton
- 1733–1734: John Robinson
- 1734–1743: Maj. Gen. John Folliot
- 1743–1745: Maj. Gen. George Churchill
- 1745–1753: Edward Braddock
- 1753–1755: Hedworth Lambton
- 1755–1762: The Hon. Bennet Noel
- 1762–1762: Maj. Gen. Julius Caesar
- 1762–1763: William A'Court
- 1763–1777: John Thomas
- 1777–1785: Henry Lister
- 1785–1789: Maj. Gen. Harry Trelawny
- 1789–1795: Maj. Gen. Anthony George Martin
- 1795–1800: Lt. Gen. Thomas Slaughter Stanwix
- 1800–1800: Maj. Gen. Edward Morrison
- 1800–1814: Maj. Gen. Andrew Cowell
- 1814–1821: Col. the Hon. Henry Brand
- 1821–1825: Col. Alexander Woodford
- 1825–1830: Col. James Macdonell
- 1830–1836: Col. Daniel Mackinnon
- 1836–1837: Col. Sir William Maynard Gomm
- 1837–1839: Col. John Fremantle
- 1839–1846: Col. William Lovelace Walton
- 1846–1848: Col. Charles Anthony Ferdinand Bentinck
- 1848–1851: Col. Thomas Chaplin
- 1851–1854: Col. Henry John William Bentinck
- 1854–1855: Col. the Hon. Arthur Upton
- 1855–1858: Col. the Hon. George Upton
- 1858–1860: Col. Lord Frederick Paulet
- 1860–1861: Col. William Samuel Newton
- 1861–1862: Col. Spencer Perceval
- 1862–1863: Col. Thomas Montagu Steele
- 1863–1866: Col. William Mark Wood
- 1866–1868: Col. Dudley William Carleton
- 1868–1871: Col. the Hon. Arthur Edward Hardinge
- 1871–1877: Col. the Hon. Percy Robert Basil Feilding
- 1877–1880: Col. Arthur James Lyon-Fremantle
- 1880–1885: Col. George Robert FitzRoy
- 1885–1890: Col. Godfrey James Wigram
- 1890–1895: Col. John Barton Sterling
- 1895–1898: Col. the Viscount Falmouth
- 1898–1900: Col. the Hon. H. W. L. Corry
- 1900–1903: Col. Sir Francis Aylmer Graves-Sawle
- 1903–1907: Col. Alfred Edward Codrington
- 1907–1910: Col. Frederick I. Maxse
- 1910–1913: Col. the Hon. William Lambton
- 1913–1914: Col. Cecil S. O. Monck
- 1914–1917: Col. J. A. G. Richardson-Drummond-Hay
- 1917–1919: Col. the Hon. G. A. C. Crichton
- 1919–1919: Col. J. McC. Steele
- 1919–1923: Col. H. W. Studd
- 1923–1927: Col. J. V. Campbell
- 1927–1930: Col. C. P. Heywood
- 1932–1934: Col. H. C. Loyd
- 1934–1938: Col. A. F. Smith
- 1938–1939: Brig. J. A. C. Whitaker
- 1939–1941: Col. G. J. Edwards
- 1941–1942: Col J. C. W. Finch
- 1942–1945: M. F. Trew
- 1945–1946: A. Campbell, Lord Stratheden
- 1946–1949: E. R. Hill
- 1959–1961: Col. Richard J. V. Crichton
- 1961–1964: Col. Robert C. Windsor-Clive
- 1964: Col. Sir Jeffrey L. Darell, Bt.
- 1964–1965: Col. David A. H. Toler
- 1965–1967: Col. Alan B. Pemberton
- 1967–1969: Col. Sir Ian L. Jardine, Bt.
- 1969–1972: Col. Edward T. Smyth-Osbourne
- 1972–1975: Col. Everard I. Windsor-Clive
- 1975–1978: Col. Michael A. P. Mitchell
- 1978–1981: Col. Peter G. S. Tower
- 1981–1984: Col. Martin W. F. Maxse
- 1984–1986: Col. H. Malcolm C. Havergal
- 1986–1992: Col. Sir Brian W. de S. Barttelot, Bt.
- 1992–2002: Brig. Richard J. Heywood
- 2002–2012: Brig. Jonathan J. S. Bourne-May
- 2012–2015: Brig. Greville K. Bibby
- 2015–2018: Brig. Robin C. N. Sergeant
- 2018–present: Col. Toby P. O. Till

== Battle honours ==
The Coldstream Guards have earned 117 battle honours:

- Tangier 1680, Namur 1695, Gibraltar 1704–1705, Oudenarde, Malplaquet, Dettingen, Lincelles, Egypt, Talavera, Barrosa, Fuentes d'Onor, Salamanca, Nive, Peninsula, Waterloo, Alma, Inkerman, Sevastopol, Tel-el-Kebir, Egypt 1882, Suakin 1885, Modder River, South Africa 1899–1902
- The Great War (5 battalions): Mons, Retreat from Mons, Marne 1914, Aisne 1914, Ypres 1914 '17, Langemarck 1914, Gheluvelt, Nonne Bosschen, Givenchy 1914, Neuve Chapelle, Aubers, Festubert 1915, Loos, Mount Sorrel, Somme 1916 '18, Flers-Courcelette, Morval, Pilckem, Menin Road, Poelcappelle, Passchendaele, Cambrai 1917 '18, St. Quentin, Bapaume 1918, Arras 1918, Lys, Hazebrouck, Albert 1918, Scarpe 1918, Drocourt-Quéant, Hindenburg Line, Havrincourt, Canal du Nord, Selle, Sambre, France and Flanders 1914–1918
- The Second World War: Dyle, Defence of Escaut, Dunkirk 1940, Cagny, Mont Pincon, Quarry Hill, Estry, Heppen, Nederrijn, Venraij, Meijel, Roer, Rhineland, Reichswald, Cleve, Goch, Moyland, Hochwald, Rhine, Lingen, Uelzen, North-West Europe 1940 '44–45, Egyptian Frontier 1940, Sidi Barrani, Halfaya 1941, Tobruk 1941–42, Msus, Knightsbridge, Defence of Alamein Line, Medenine, Mareth, Longstop Hill 1942, Sbiba, Steamroller Farm, Tunis, Hammam Lif, North Africa 1940–1943, Salerno, Battipaglia, Capezzano, Volturno Crossing, Monte Camino, Calabritto, Garigliano Crossing, Monte Ornito, Monte Piccolo, Capture of Perugia, Arezzo, Advance to Florence, Monte Domini, Catarelto Ridge, Argenta Gap, Italy 1943–1945
- Gulf 1991

== Order of precedence ==
Preceded by Grenadier Guards	Infantry Order of Precedence	Succeeded by Scots Guards

== Alliances ==
- Canada – The Governor General's Foot Guards
- Australia – 2nd Battalion, Royal Australian Regiment
- Royal Navy – HMS Ocean

== Gallery ==
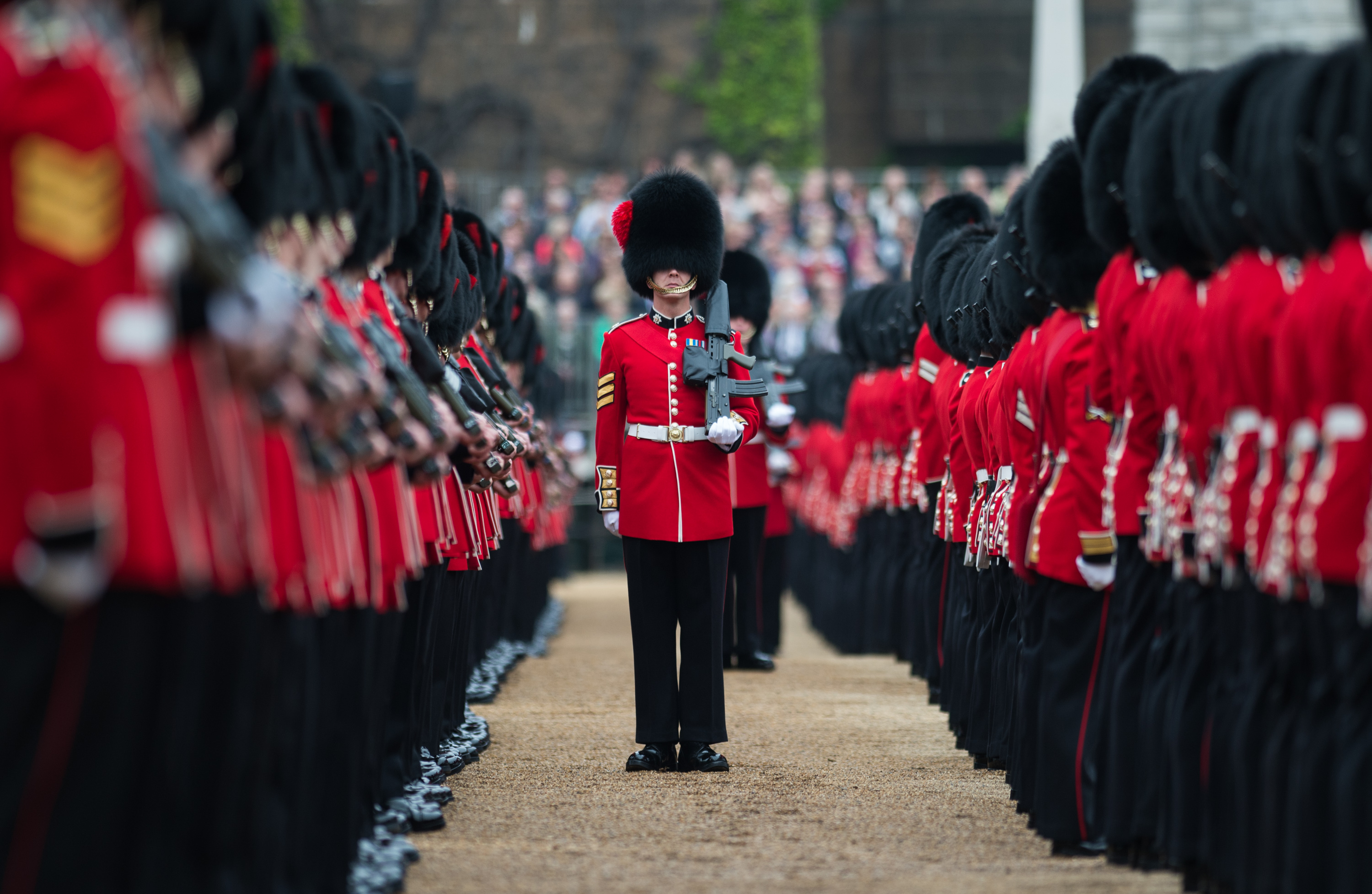
A Coldstream Guards Sergeant dressing through the ranks during the rehearsal for the Trooping the Colour

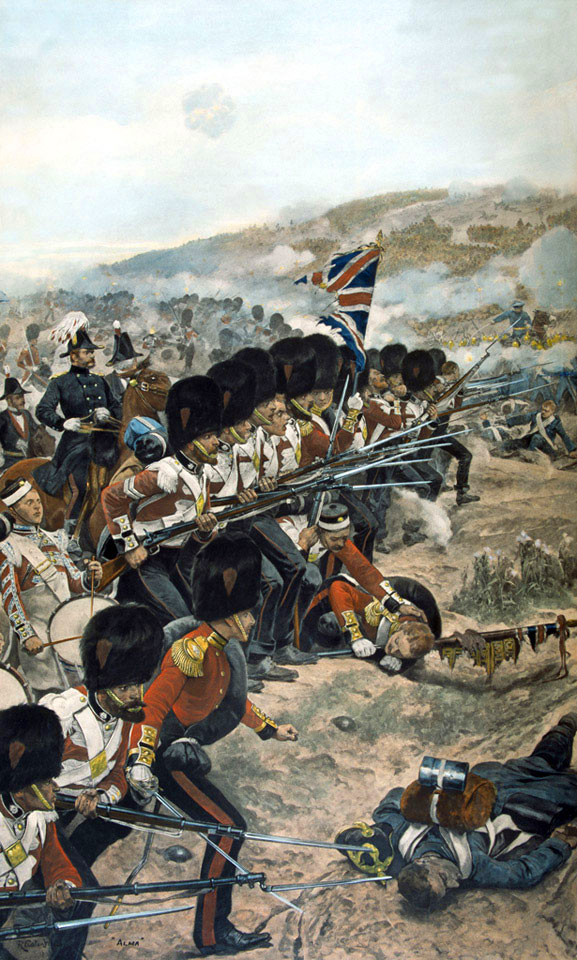
Battle of Alma in the Crimean War

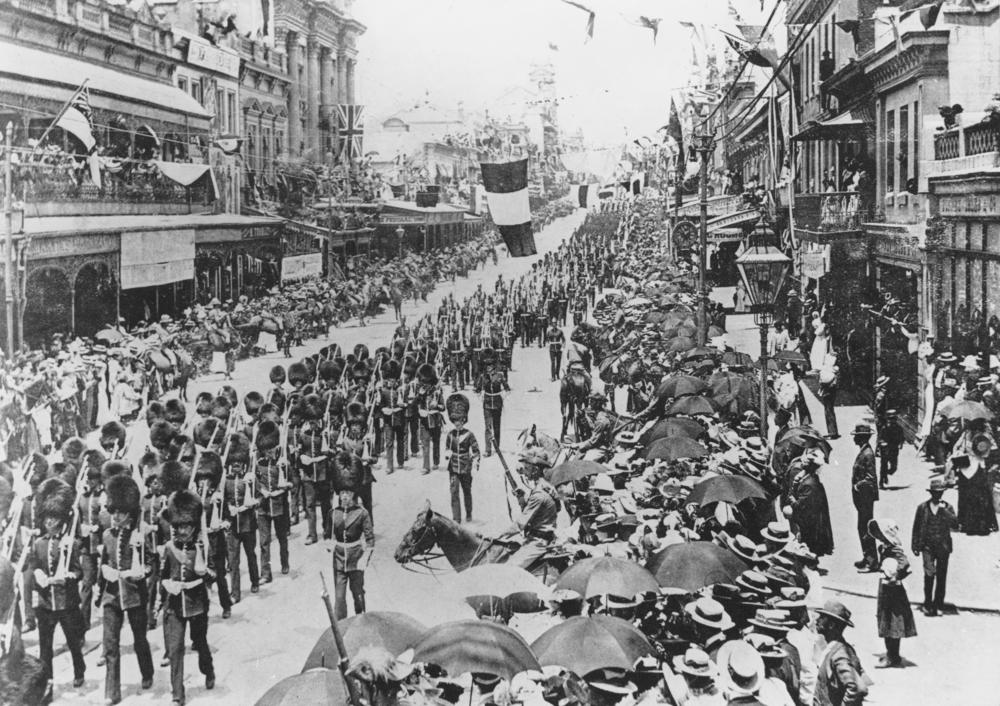
Coldstream Guards marching in Brisbane, Australia, 1901

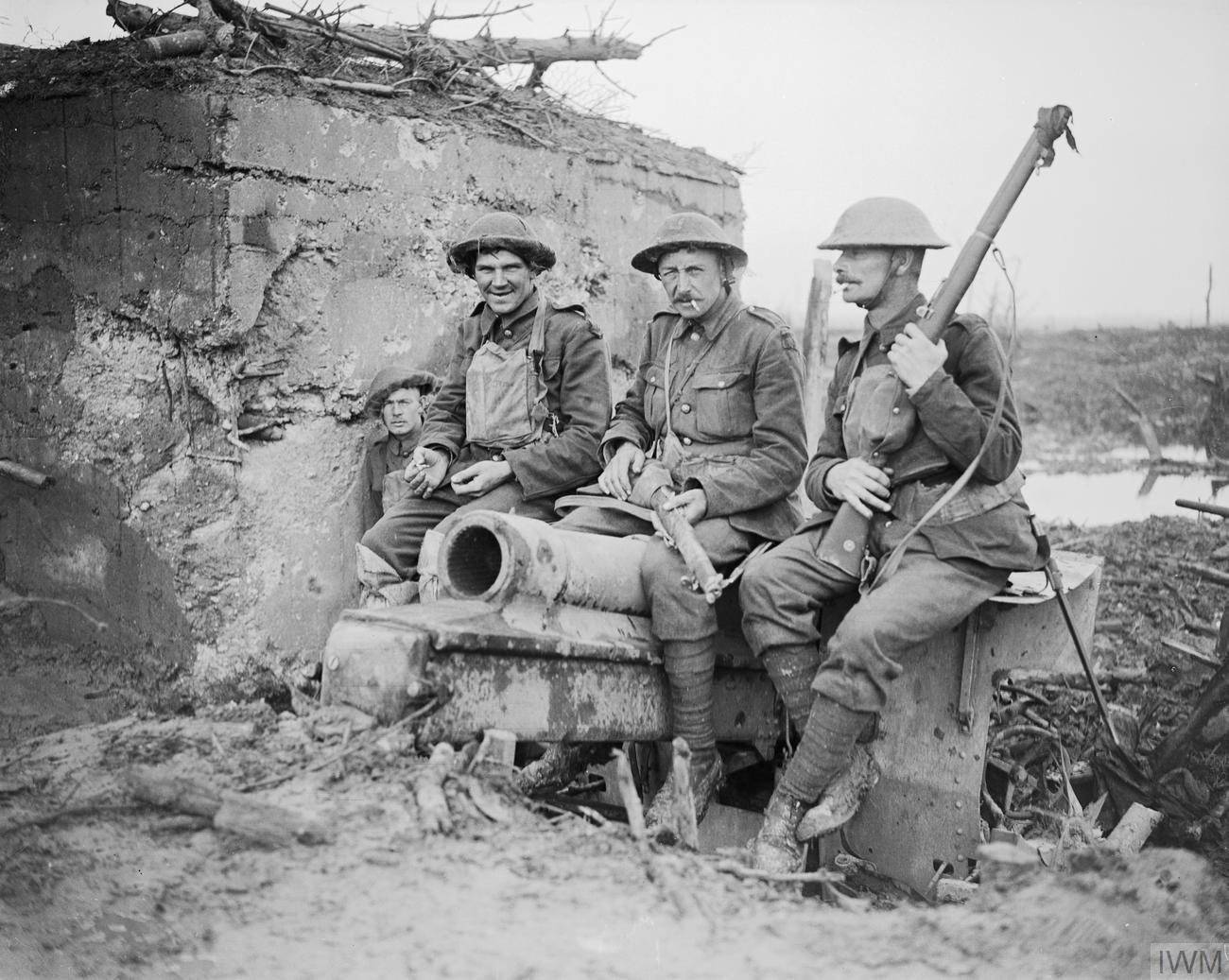
4th Coldstream in the Third Battle of Ypres, 1917

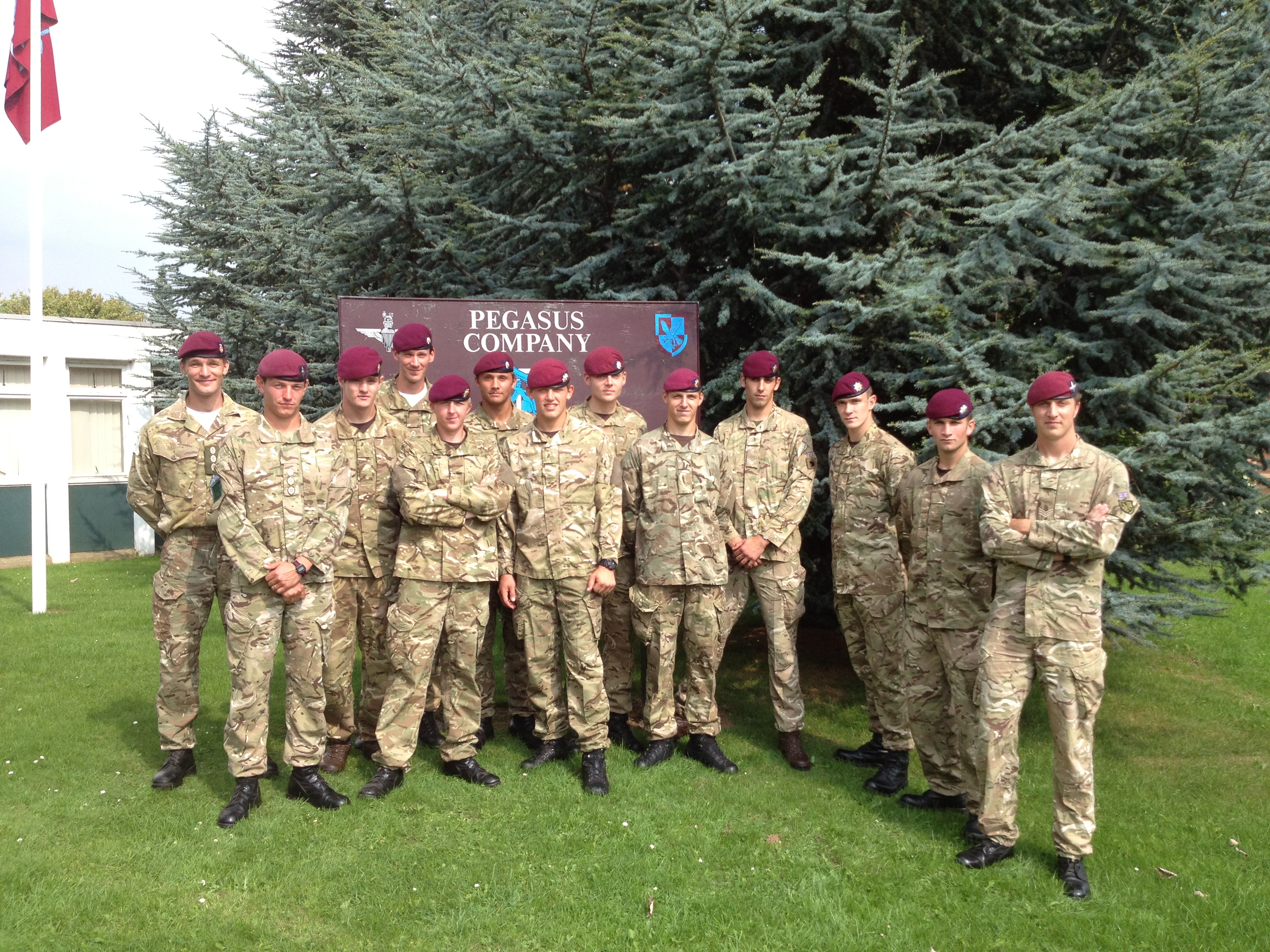
Coldstream Guard members of the Guards Parachute Platoon, 3rd Battalion, Parachute Regiment

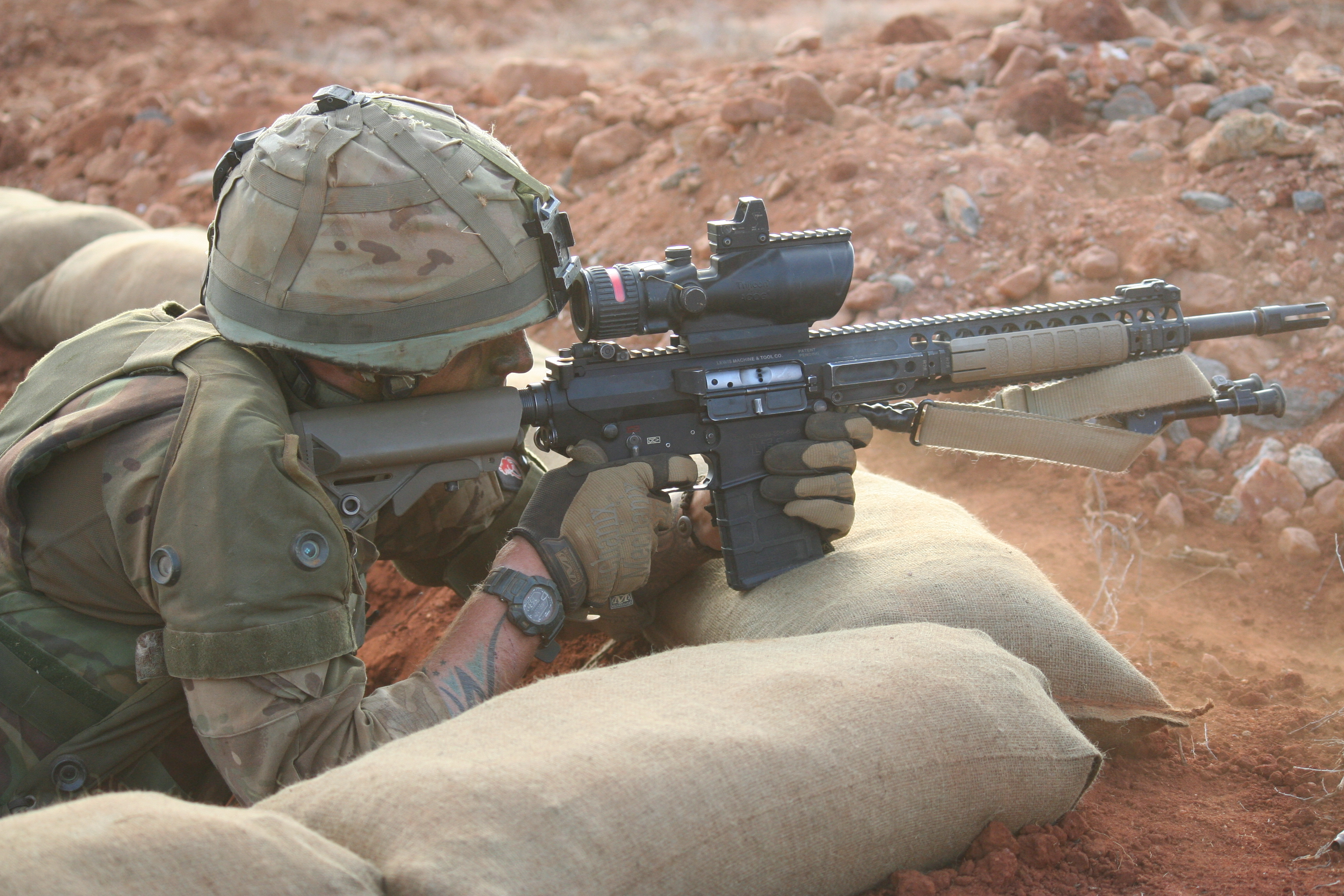
Guardsman using the Sharpshooter Weapon System

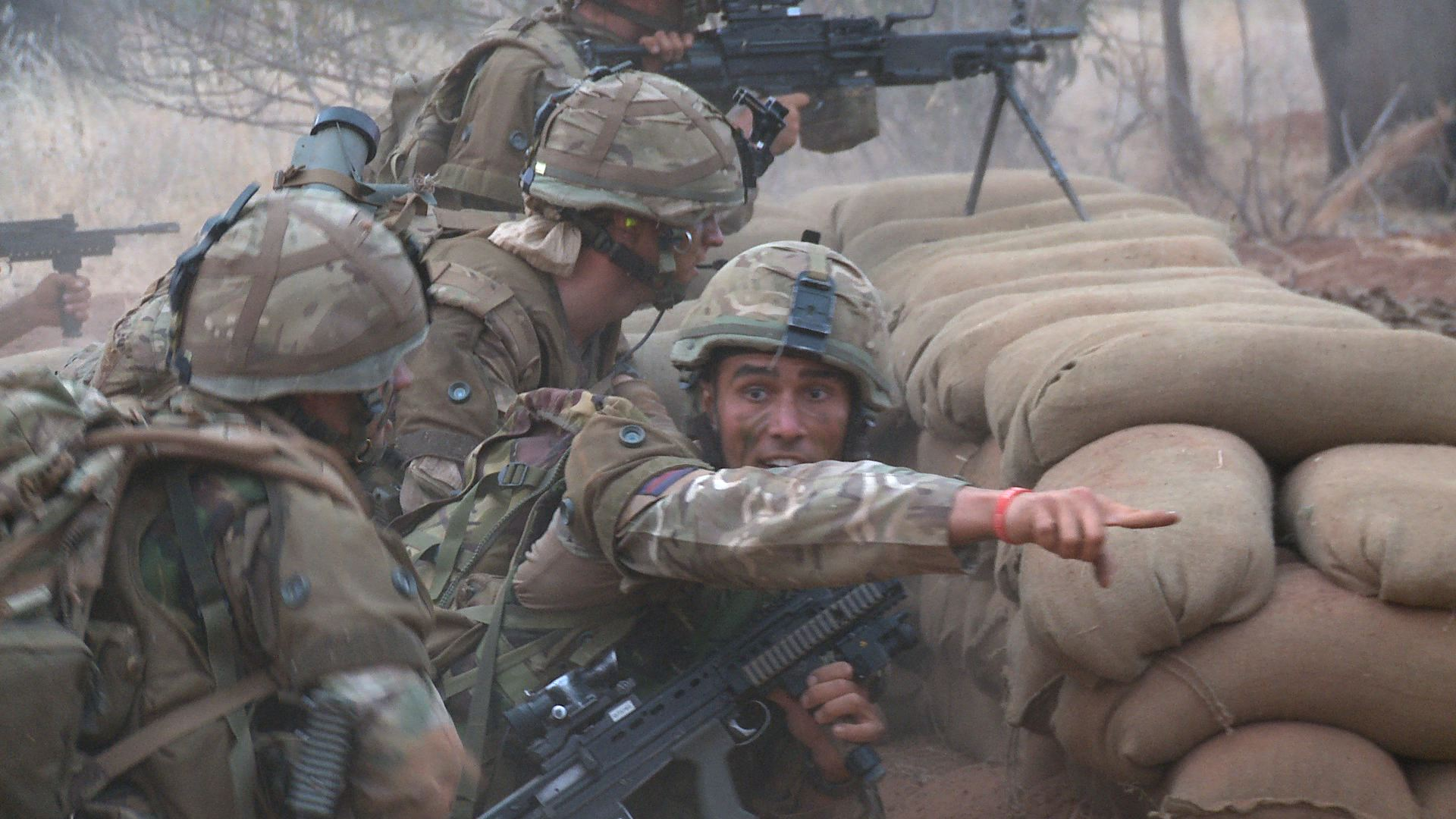
Section Second in Command giving Quick Battle Orders during exercise

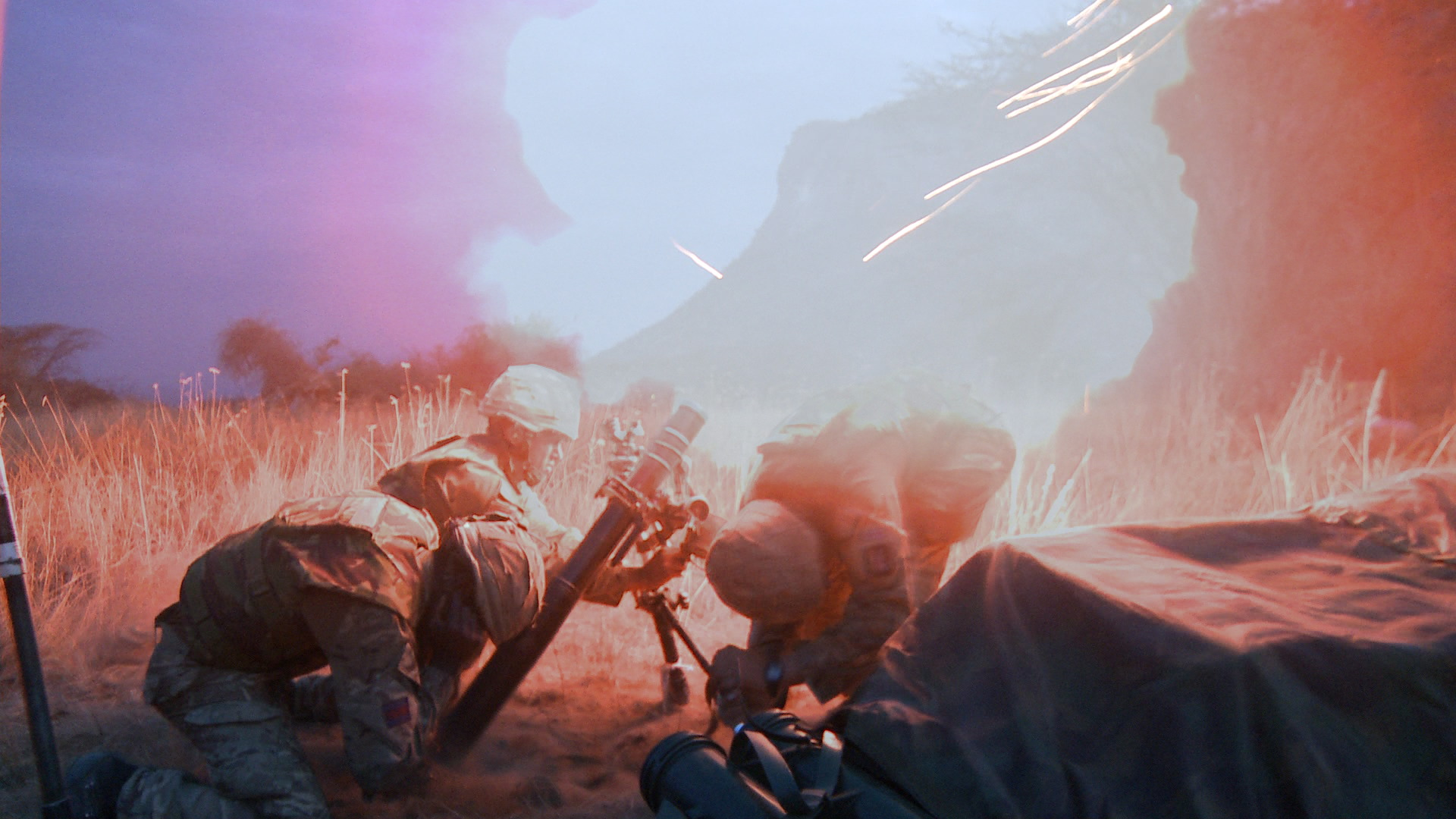
81mm Mortar moments after firing.

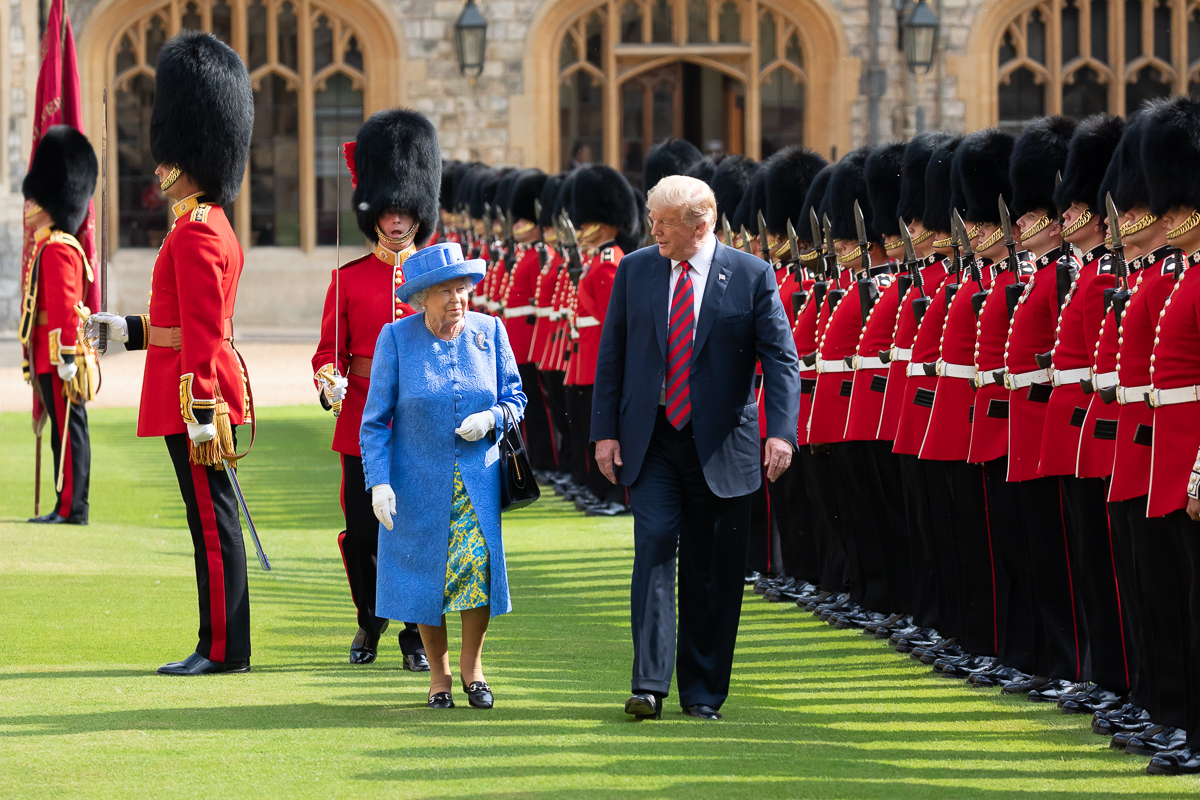
U.S. President Donald Trump and Queen Elizabeth II, accompanied by Major Oliver Biggs, reviewing the 1st Battalion, Coldstream Guards at Windsor Castle during Trump's visit to London in July 2018.

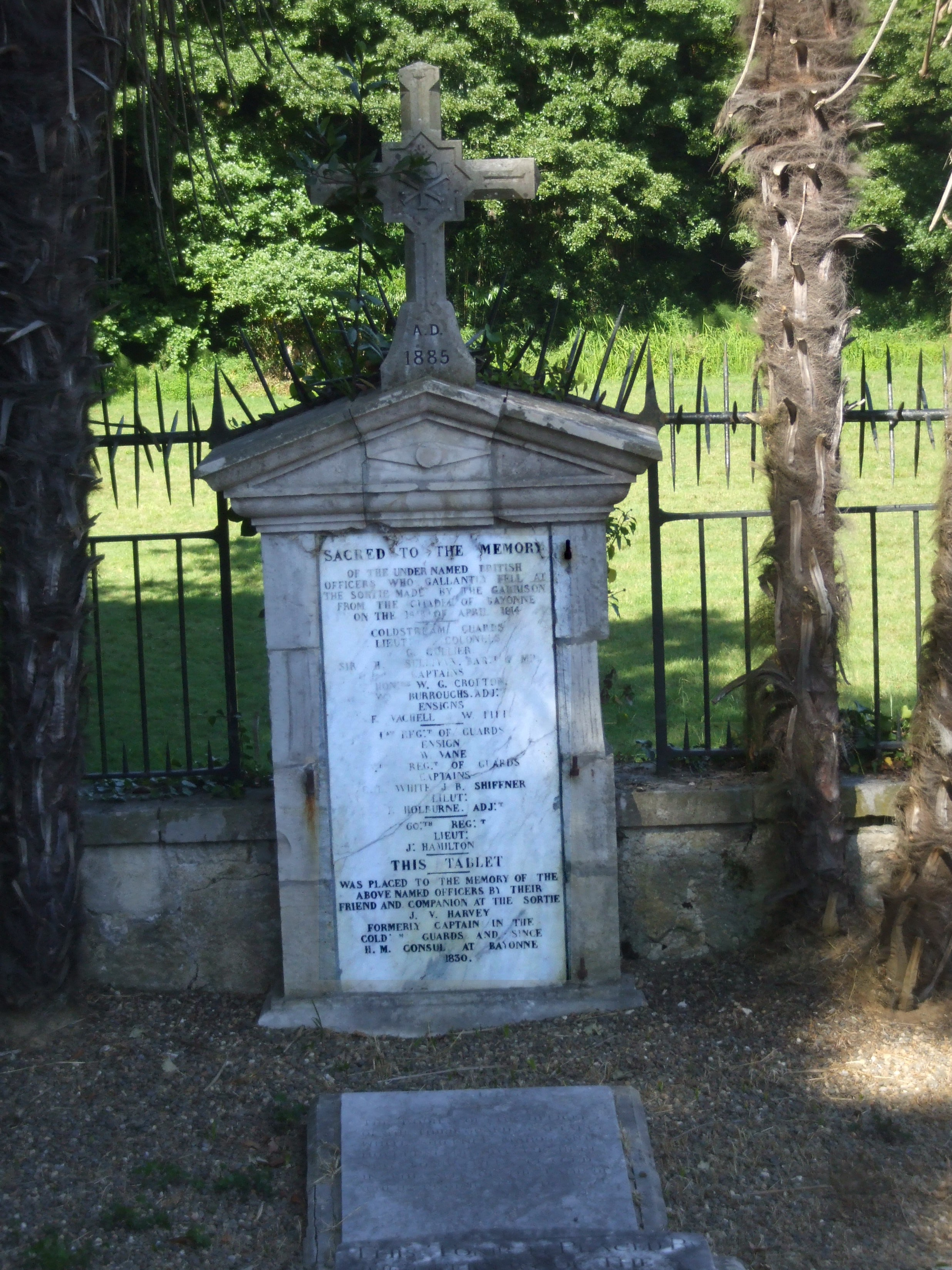
Battle of Bayonne's cemetery, 1814, France, detail

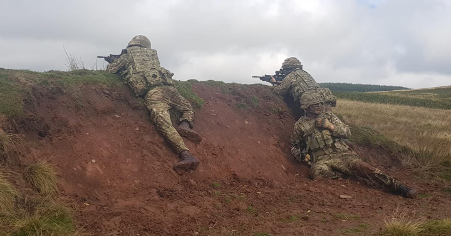
1st Battalion on Exercise in Kenya 2019

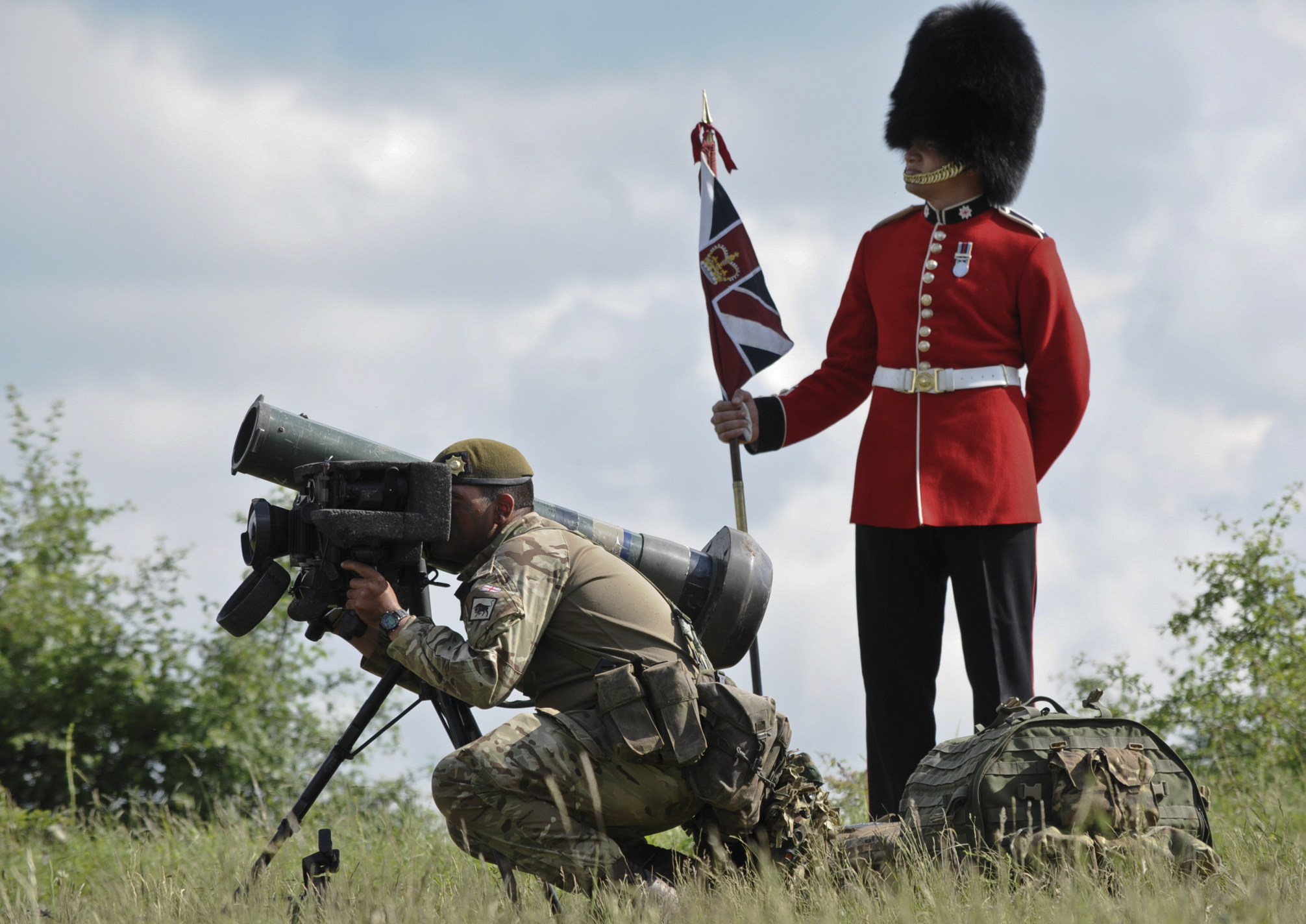
Two Coldstream Guardsmen show the traditional uniform and the capabilities with a Javelin system during a small-arms display in Cincu, Romania

== See also ==
- Category:Coldstream Guards officers
- Category:Coldstream Guards soldiers
- Eddie Chapman criminal and World War II British double agent served with the Coldstream Guards.
- Honourable Artillery Company, the oldest surviving regiment in the British Army
- Band of the Coldstream Guards
