= Victoria Barracks, Windsor =

British Army barracks

Victoria Barracks
- Windsor, Berkshire in England
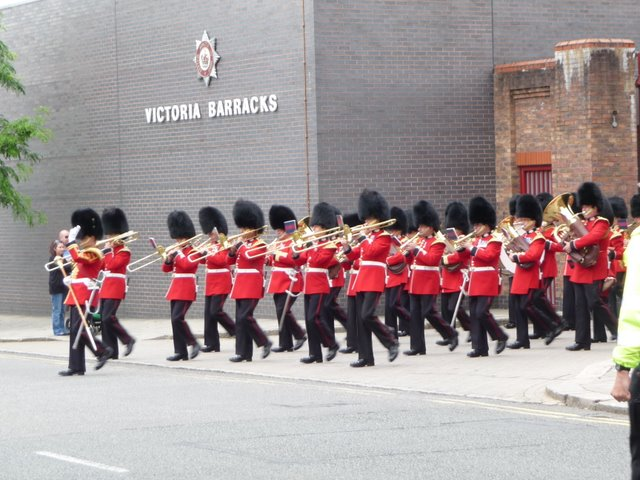
- Band of The Scots Guards leaves Victoria Barracks

Site information
- Type: Barracks
- Owner: Ministry of Defence
- Operator: British Army

Location
- Shown within Berkshire
- Coordinates: 51°28′43″N 000°36′26″W

Site history
- Built: 1853
- Built for: War Office
- In use: 1853-Present

Garrison information
- Occupants: 1st Battalion, Coldstream Guards

Victoria Barracks is a British Army barracks located 0.25 miles (0.40 km) south of Windsor Castle.

== History ==
The original barracks were built in 1853 and were enlarged in 1911. The old barracks were completely demolished in 1988 and new barracks were built between 1989 and 1993.

The barracks remain the place from where troops set off to change the guard at Windsor Castle. The Changing the Guard at Windsor Castle takes place on Tuesdays, Thursdays and Saturdays from 11am.

=== Intruder ===
In April 2022, an intruder who was a priest managed to spend the night at the barracks despite showing no identification or credentials, reportedly eating and drinking with senior officers, having claimed to have been a friend of the battalion's padre. Thames Valley Police officers attended and removed the intruder, Father Cruz, from the barracks. No further action was taken. However, an Army spokesman said: "The Army takes this breach of security extremely seriously and it will be thoroughly investigated as a matter of priority."

== Units ==
The sole garrisoned unit, the 1st Battalion, Coldstream Guards, is a light infantry battalion operating as part of the 11th Security Force Assistance Brigade.

== Sources ==
- Naylor, Murray (1995). Among Friends: Scots Guards 1956-93. Pen & Sword. ISBN 978-0850524550.
