= Battle of Enslin Station =

1899 engagement during the Second Boer War

- Part of the Second Boer War
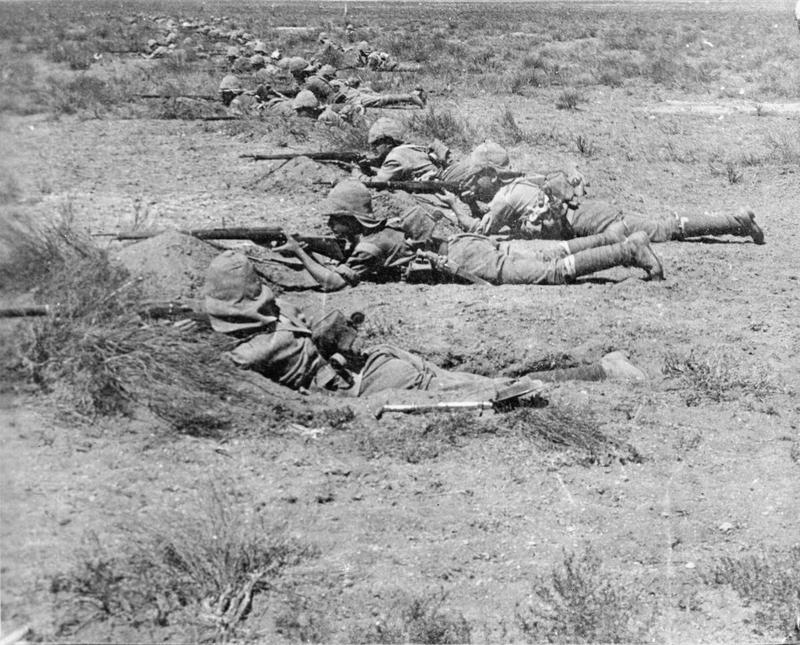
- British soldiers near Enslin on patrol, c. 1900
Date	6-7 December 1899
Location	Enslin, Free State, South Africa
Result	British victory

Belligerents
United Kingdom	South African Republic; Orange Free State

Commanders and leaders
(United Kingdom) Lord Methuen (United Kingdom) Andrew Wauchope (United Kingdom) H. C. Godley	(South African Republic) Jacobus Prinsloo

Strength
1,960 men 10 Artillery Guns	1,000 Burghers; 3 Artillery Guns

The Battle of Enslin Station was an engagement during the night of 6-7 December 1899 between the forces of the Orange Free State and the British Empire during the Second Boer War. Before the battle, Lord Methuen had advanced past the Riet River and towards Spytfontein after the Battle of Modder River on 28 November. With his supply line extended, the railways were subject to attack, as the bulk of the army was situated at the front, with sparse vanguards patrolling the various sidings between De Aar and Modder River. The railways were guarded by barbed wire and patrols, though before the arrival of the Australians and Canadians in 1900, the British forces were spread thin. A previous battle had occurred near Enslin on 25 November; after the major battle, a small force was detached to guard the station in-case of future attack.

== Background ==
In November 1899, Lord Methuen set out to relieve Kimberley as part of General Buller's three-pronged offensive of the Boer republics, which would be based primarily around the railway extending from Cape Town to the beleaguered city. Starting on the 20th of November, he moved from De Aar and across the Orange River, arriving at the town of Belmont on 22 November. After repelling the Boer forces there on 23 November, they stayed at Belmont. On 24 November, the British advanced to Enslin, where Boer forces were reported on Graspan-kopje; the battle the next day would force most of the Boers to retreat to entrenched positions at the Modder and Riet Rivers. Between 25-27 of November, Lord Methuen moved from Enslin to Klokfontein, believing there to only be a small force of Boer infantry at Modder River; on 28 November, Methuen launched an assault on the Boer positions there. Methuen had received poor reconnaissance, as the Boers had entrenched and heavily fortified their positions along the banks of both rivers. The Boers eventually retreated from their positions, but not after a long afternoon in which many British soldiers were unable to move. After the battle, Methuen spent his time consolidating his forces and attempting to repair the bridge across the Modder River to continue his advance. Methuen's supply line was the railway, which was vulnerable to attack from irregular Boer forces; small guards had been dispatched to the railway sidings in order to keep watch and prevent the Boers from sabotaging the railways.

== Battle ==
On 6 December, Boer commandant Prinsloo set out with a force of 1000 men and three artillery guns from Major Albrecht; he moved west into what is now Mokala National Park and, after evading British patrols, moved upon Enslin Station. The station and a nearby orchard was guarded by two companies, equating to roughly 260 men, of the 2nd Battalion Northamptonshire Infantry; this unit was under the command of Captain H.C. Godley, and was tasked with defending the British supply line along the Cape Railway. Godley had created sangars and barbed wire as defenses in case of Boer attack. Prinsloo's force blew up a railway about two miles north of Enslin; British forces were alerted to the Boer presence, and Godley sent a telegram to Methuen before the Boers cut the line. The Boers then moved closer, with Boer artillery positioning itself at the top of a hill north of Enslin, and opened up at ~4 AM. Soon after, the Boer mounted infantry began to attack, with the British scrambling to defend the station. Despite being overwhelmed, Godley held off the Boers, preventing them from reaching the station itself; this did not, however, prevent the damage of British barbed wire and of actual track itself.

Upon the news of the Boer attack, Lord Methuen sent out the 65th Battery of Artillery, two companies of the 1st Battalion Coldstream Guards, an armored train of Seaforth Highlanders under the direct command of Major-General Wauchope, and the New South Wales Lancers. These forces arrived en masse in the early hours of 7 December, pushing back the Boers; after six hours of fighting, Prinsloo retreated, and the damage on the British railway was swiftly repaired. Boers that remained took up positions at Graspan, though they retreated after a British assault. Prinsloo's retreat would cause him to be voted out as the Free State Commandant, replaced by A. M. Ferreira on 8 December.

== Aftermath ==
With the raid at Enslin Station, Methuen continued to delay his advance, waiting for further reinforcements of the Highland Brigade to pursue his objective of relieving Kimberley. On 7 December, the railway bridge across the Riet River was completed, allowing for large numbers of troops to cross over. The Boers used this time to consolidate their forces at Magersfontein kopje; on 10 December, Methuen launched an artillery barrage and ordered the Highlanders to perform a night march. On 11 December, the Highlanders would attempt to attack Boer positions at Magersfontein - the resulting engagement would result in the most costly battle of the conflict to date, permanently halting Methuen until Lord Roberts took command.

== Accounts of the Battle ==
The battle is mainly mentioned in contemporary British sources, and accounts generally agree on the fact that it was Boer commandant Prinsloo who attacked the station on the night of 6-7 December 1899.

Frederick Maurice describes the engagement as a minor one, and reports that damage done by the Boers was minimal. Only one paragraph is dedicated in the first volume of his book, A History of the War in South Africa 1899-1902.

L.S. Amery in Volume II of The Times's History of the War describes how Captain Godley, commander of the British patrol at Enslin "intrenched there and gallantly held their own"; he subsequently describes the Boers as "retreating hastily" and that Prinsloo acted cowardly. Amery also notes that the Boers used local farmers to spy on the British, but this is not present in any other source.

H.W. Wilson's account, With the Flag to Pretoria, makes note of the same facts that Maurice does, but presents them in a more sensationalist manner, "the British force, though without artillery and grievously outnumbered, held its own bravely in face of the heavy Boer shell and rifle fire." Wilson mentions that Godley was able to communicate via telegram just as the attack started to ask Methuen for help, with the line being cut afterwards. The 62nd Battery is described as coming into action at noon, but other sources state that the engagement was confined to the morning.

Ernest N. Bennet, author of With Methuen's Column on an Ambulance Train, who was a doctor present in a hospital column that was part of Lord Methuen's Kimberley relief force, describes the battle in roughly the same manner, though he speculates the strength of the Boers to be only 500, which is half of the actual figure present. He describes the battlefield when he visited it on 10 December as thus:

"There was scarcely a twig or leaf in the orchard which was not torn by shrapnel and Mauser bullets. The walls of the house were chipped and pierced in every direction, and one corner of the earthwork had been carried off by a shell. Yet in the two companies there were only eight casualties! An almost parallel case was furnished by Rostall's orchard at Modder River, which was held by the Boers, and swept for hours by so fearful a fire of shrapnel that the peach-trees were cut down in every direction and scarcely a square foot behind the trenches unmarked by the leaden hail. Nevertheless, when the guns had perforce to cease fire on the advance of our infantry, the Boers who held the orchard leapt up from behind the earthwork and poured such a murderous fire upon our men that they were forced to withdraw. It was the old story over again—that shell fire, unless it enfilades, does not kill men in trenches."

Johan Hendrik Breytenbach, a South African historian, provides an account of the Boer operations. In Volume II of his series, Die Geskiedenis van die Tweede Vryheidsoorlog in Suid-Afrika, 1899–1902 (lit. 'The History of the Second War of Independence in South Africa, 1899-1902'), he comments that Prinsloo, had he been more prudent, may have forced the Enslin garrison to surrender and cut Methuen's supply line off, forcing him to dig in at Modder River. Breytenbach also makes note of Wauchope's Highland Brigade arriving and pushing back the British forces near noon; he does incorrectly confuse the New South Wales Lancers with the 12th Lancers. A particular note of the gallantry and stubbornness of the British forces, and that Prinsloo did not properly defend his positions, "giving in" with little resistance to the companies of the Coldstream Guards that arrived via armored train, is mentioned by him.

Thomas Pakenham does not make mention of the battle, and it is absent in his book, The Boer War.

Captain Thomas Henry Eyre Lloyd, a staff officer in the 2nd Battalion Coldstream Guards during the Second Boer War, mentions the engagement in his diary.

"Boers under Prinsloo cut railway at Enselin [sic; Enslin] siding last night... Boers were driven off at Enselin [sic; Enslin] siding, but not before they had blown up three culverts and cut several miles of wire. A few Boers have taken up their old position at Gras Pans [sic; Graspan]."

Details vary among accounts, but the primary details that all accounts are concordant with is that the Boers, under commandant Prinsloo, attacked a British force at Enslin Station on 6-7 December 1899; the Boers were driven to retreat by British reinforcements by morning, and that the Boers had destroyed railway and telegraph wire during the engagement.
