= Modder River (disambiguation) =

The Modder River is in South Africa, forming part of the border between the Northern Cape and the Free State provinces.

Modder River may also refer to:

- Modder River, Northern Cape, a small town in the Northern Cape
- Battle of Modder River, an 1899 battle of the Second Boer War

== See also ==
- Modder
