= Thomas Kelly-Kenny =

British Army general (1840–1914)

General Sir Thomas Kelly-Kenny GCB GCVO
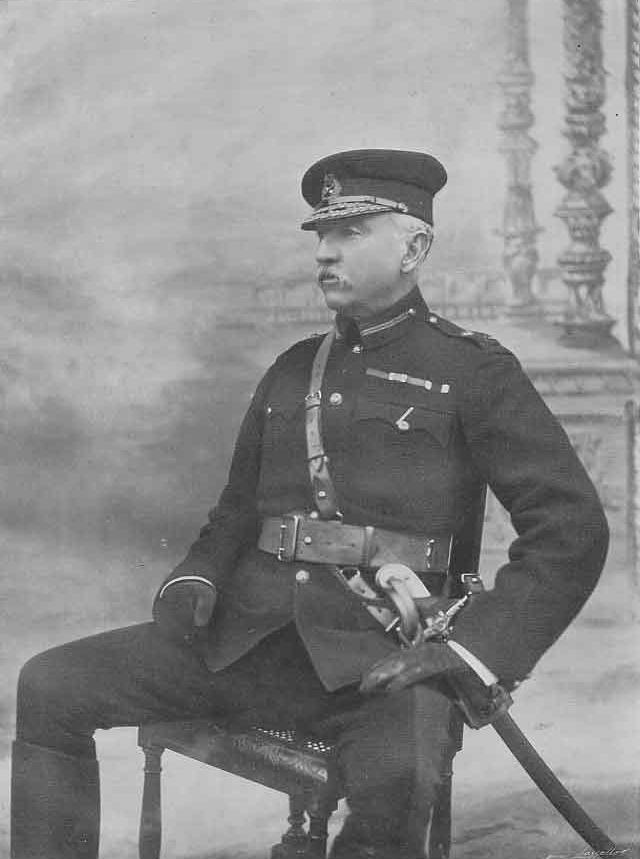
- Born: 27 February 1840; Kilrush, County Clare, Ireland
- Died: 26 December 1914 (aged 74); Hove, Sussex, England
- Military career
- Allegiance: United Kingdom
- Branch: British Army
- Service years: 1858–1907
- Rank: General
- Unit: 2nd (The Queen's Royal) Regiment of Foot
- Commands: Adjutant-General to the Forces; 6th Division
- Conflicts: Second Opium War; British Expedition to Abyssinia; Second Boer War
- Awards: Knight Grand Cross of the Order of the Bath; Knight Grand Cross of the Royal Victorian Order

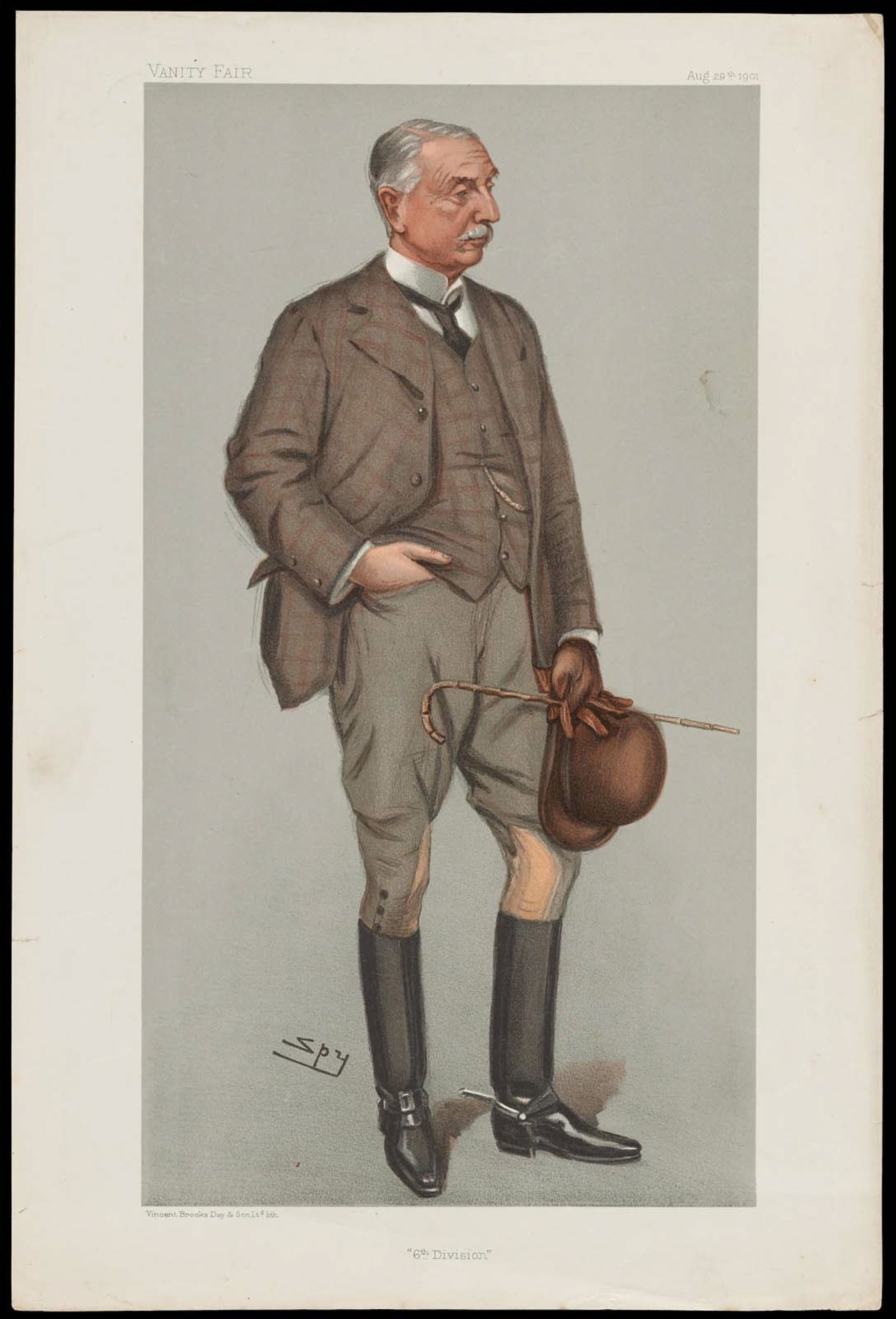
"6th Division". Caricature by "Spy" published in Vanity Fair in 1901.

General Sir Thomas Kelly-Kenny (27 February 1840 – 26 December 1914) was a British Army general who served in the Second Boer War.

== Military and political career ==
Thomas Kelly was born on 27 February 1840 in Kilrush, County Clare, Ireland, the fifth son of Matthew Kelly and Mary Kenny. He was educated as a lay student at St. Patrick's College, Carlow (University of London). He assumed in 1874 the additional name of Kenny, under the will of his maternal uncle, Dr. Mathias Kenny, a survivor of the Peninsular War and the Battle of Waterloo.

Kelly-Kenny was appointed ensign without purchase in the 1st Battalion, 2nd (The Queen's Royal) Regiment of Foot on 2 February 1858 and was appointed to command the escort of General Sir James Jackson, General Officer Commanding Cape of Good Hope. When this officer was succeeded by General Wynward, Kelly-Kenny was appointed aide-de-camp (ADC). He resigned this post on the outbreak of war with China in 1860 and accompanied his regiment to the Far East where he was appointed ADC to the commander of the 3rd Brigade, Sir Alfred Jephson, holding this post for the duration of the war. He was promoted lieutenant by purchase on 12 October 1860, the day Pekin surrendered to the allies, and engaged in the China war at Sinho and at the taking of Tanku and Taku forts. He was mentioned in despatches. He was appointed captain by purchase on 20 July 1866. He was (acting) Deputy Assistant Quartermaster General (QMG) in Bombay from 25 May 1869 to April 1870 when he was sent to Abyssinia on the outbreak of war. He was in charge of the transport train and was mentioned by Lord Napier in despatches for "zeal, energy and ability". In 1875 he graduated at the staff college, and was promoted major in 1877.

Officers of the 1st Battalion, 2nd Regiment of Foot, in Poona, India, 1877. Seated in the second row, second from the right, is Major T. Kelly-Kenny.

Kelly-Kenny took a keen interest in affairs in his native County Clare and in 1876 he was appointed Justice of the Peace for Clare (after he inherited his estates), as were his father Matthew Kelly, his uncle Mathias Kenny and his brother Matthew Butler Kelly. In 1876 the then Captain Thomas Kelly Kenny held 5,736 acres in Clare. He was patron of the school at Scropul near Treanmanagh founded by his uncle Dr Mathias Kenny. His family had a strong history of involvement in politics and local government. His mother's first cousin Richard Kenny was Vice Provost for Ennis in 1827 and also served as a grand juror. Another of their first cousins, Dean John Kenny of Kilrush and Ennis, was an active figure in political and social reform in those towns. His second cousin Fr Matthew J Kenny was one of the first two presidents of the Clare Farmers' Association and a founder member of the Land League. His uncle Fr Timothy Kelly was an active campaigner for famine relief as parish priest of Kilrush in the famine years. In the late 1840s his father Matthew Kelly and other Gallery and Kenny relatives were poor law guardians.

In 1879, the then Major Thomas Kelly-Kenny put his name forward for the April by-election in County Clare. He was opposed by the Catholic clergy, so withdrew his candidacy and did not go to the poll. Ignatius Murphy recounts in his history of Killaloe diocese (p. 225) that Bishop Ryan and his priests met in Ennis to discuss the merits of the various potential candidates and did not endorse Kelly-Kenny. The Limerick & Tipperary Vindicator reported on 11 April that the Bishop and many curates were pro-Major Kelly-Kenny as he was Catholic, locally born and a local landowner. Against him were his Liberal politics. The majority of the curates voted against him and the Limerick and Tipperary Vindicator reported: "A strong adverse expression on behalf of the Catholic curates who constitute a large majority overwhelmed the scales against Major Kelly-Kenny who notwithstanding rumour to the contrary has withdrawn". The paper goes on to quote his resignation letter and also mentions that his (Unionist) cousin Matthew Kenny solicitor of Ennis was his conducting agent. The clergy later supported the O'Gorman Mahon as a home rule candidate. He was narrowly elected. Some of the curates' sentiments are possibly expressed by Father Matthew J Kenny in his post-election address. He expressed a wish for the downfall of the Liberal and Tory parties in Ireland and the end of Landlord Tyrannies.

Cecil Stacpoole Kenny recounts that Major Kelly-Kenny's name was one of the three on the roll that went to the Lord Lieutenant for the High Sheriff of Clare in 1880 but he did not succeed. This post was by appointment. He was later appointed Deputy Lieutenant for Clare in 1901. The papers confirming his appointment are in the Irish Jesuit Archives.

Kelly-Kenny was promoted lieutenant colonel on 26 July 1881, and colonel in July 1885. He was Assistant Adjutant General (AAG) and QMG North-Eastern District from 1 July 1889 to 21 September 1892, where he commanded the training camp at Strensall Camp, Yorkshire. He became AAG Aldershot Garrison on 28 December 1893 on the staff of the Duke of Connaught and then commanded the 3rd Brigade at Aldershot from 18 March 1896, with the rank of major-general, taking over from Major General Francis Clery.

=== Second Boer War ===
In the Second Boer War of 1899–1902 Kelly-Kenny was, as a lieutenant general, General Officer Commanding the 6th Division of the South African field force. He was twice mentioned in despatches and received the Queen's South Africa Medal with four clasps. He was involved in the relief of Kimberley, the battles of Paardeberg, Poplar Grove and Driefontein.

At the battle of Paardeberg, Kelly-Kenny had a conservative plan to besiege General Cronje and bombard his Boer force from a safe distance with superior artillery. When Lord Roberts became ill, he appointed Lieutenant-General Herbert Kitchener as commander. He overruled Kelly-Kenny and ordered an assault on the Boer trenches. The result was 'Bloody Sunday' — an unnecessary sacrifice of hundreds of lives on the British side.

=== War Office appointment ===
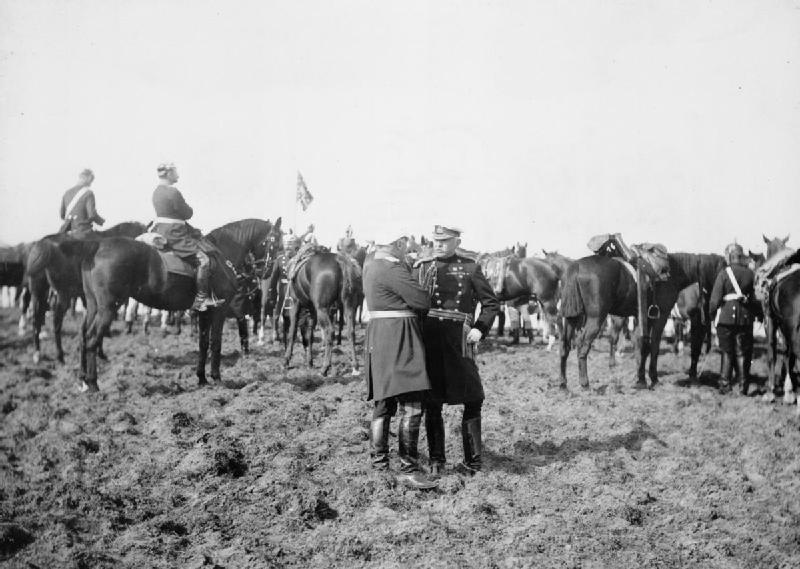
Kelly-Kenny in conversation with a German officer during the manoeuvres of 1902.

Kelly-Kenny was a close friend of King Edward VII who treated him as confidential military advisor. In October 1901 he was appointed Adjutant-General to the Forces, which post he held until 1904. This was at the insistence of the King, who liked him for his industry and administrative capacity and dislike of jobbery. However, Lord Roberts (the commander in chief) did not share this opinion and viewed Kelly-Kenny as conservative about reform, and the War Office was opposed to his appointment. Kelly-Kenny did not work well with his colleagues, who tried to get his powers reduced (which the King opposed). They then tried to move him back to command in 1902, offering him the 4th Army Corps. This he declined. The King was happy about the General's decision. He was appointed a Knight Commander of the Order of the Bath (KCB) in the 1902 Coronation Honours list published on 26 June 1902, and received the knighthood in a private audience on 2 August, during the King′s convalescence on board HMY Victoria and Albert. In September 1902, Kelly-Kenny accompanied Lord Roberts and St John Brodrick, Secretary of State for War, on a visit to Germany to attend the German army manoeuvrers as guest of the Emperor Wilhelm. In October that year, when again it was suggested that he be transferred to an army corps, the King wrote to Mr Broderick saying that the Adjutant General was a most able officer with a thorough knowledge of his profession who would be a loss to the War Office and that he was most surprised that Lord Hornby described him as reactionary when it came to reform. The War Office bowed to the King's wishes and left Kelly-Kenny in his post until the reforms in 1904. Kelly-Kenny accepted the appointment as Colonel of his regiment, The Queen's (Royal West Surrey Regiment) on 16 April 1902, and served as such until his death.

=== Later life ===
On 21 June 1904 Kelly-Kenny was made a Knight Grand Cross of the Order of the Bath (GCB). In 1905 he attended the wedding of the Crown Prince of Germany with Prince Arthur of Connaught on which occasion the Kaiser decorated him with the Grand Cross of the Order of the Red Eagle. (He had previously received the Order of the Red Eagle 1st class from the Kaiser). In 1906, he accompanied Prince Arthur of Connaught to Japan as part of a mission to present the Order of the Garter to the Emperor. While on this trip and speaking with the Mikado, the Mikado remarked on how he had to improve the horses in Japan, the breed being small. According to Redesdale (p. 26), Kelly-Kenny replied that "It is not always the big horses and the big men that do the best work" which compliment made the Mikado smile. On this trip he received from the Emperor the Grand Cross of the Order of the Rising Sun. On his return to England he received from King Edward VII the Knight Grand Cross of the Royal Victorian Order (GCVO). Documentation on his trip is held in the Irish Jesuit Archives.

Kelly-Kenny became quite well known, appearing on cigarette cards commemorating his Boer War successes. He was friendly with several members of the Royal Family, including the Prince of Wales and Prince Arthur of Connaught and stayed in both Sandringham and Frogmore as a guest of the Prince of Wales on shooting parties. Shooting cards from the Sandringham shoots are in the possession of descendants of the General's heir Thomas O'Gorman, as is a chair made from Elm on the royal estate given to Kelly-Kenny. He was a regular at court and was on friendly terms with Queen Alexandra, who carved a tea table for him herself. He accompanied the French ex-Empress Eugenie on a yachting tour around Ireland in 1909.

Kelly-Kenny lived largely in Britain, where his clubs were Army and Navy and Arthur's, and he let his house at Doolough Lodge in County Clare to his brother Matthew Butler Kelly JP, who is recorded as living at that address in Thom's Directories. There are unsubstantiated reports that royalty stayed at Doolough Lodge with Kelly-Kenny, for example that King George V visited Doolough Lodge, as Prince of Wales in 1906 and that George V stayed at Doolough Lodge during his visit to Ireland in July 1911.

Kelly-Kenny retired from the Army in 1907. He sold his lands to the tenants under the 1909 Land Purchase Act in 1909.

In his Bureau of Military History Witness Statement, Seán Fitzgibbon reports that at a meeting in Dublin on 3 August 1914, the day on which Britain declared war on Germany, Sir Thomas Myles, who the previous weekend had landed a consignment of guns for the Irish Volunteers at Kilcoole, said he had a leader for the Irish Volunteers (who should take over the defence of Ireland and re-create Grattan's Parliament) in the person of Kelly-Kenny.

Cecil Stacpoole Kenny records that one of the last things he did was to visit his cousin Lieutenant Bertram Maurice Kenny in hospital, where he was seriously wounded. Kelly-Kenny was proud of the family connection with Lieutenant Kenny's father William Kenny (judge, privy councillor and Unionist MP) to whom he left £1000 in his will.

Kelly-Kenny died at Hove on 26 December 1914. He is buried in Hove Cemetery having left strict instructions in his will that he did not want a military funeral.

The executors of his will included his nephews Matthew Devitt, a Jesuit priest, and Thomas O'Gorman, of Cahircalla, to whom he left the bulk of his large estate, with some small bequests to other family members. A collection of his personal papers inherited by Fr Devitt are now in the Irish Jesuit Archives.

Military offices
| Preceded by Sir Evelyn Wood | Adjutant General; 1901–1904 | Succeeded by Sir Charles Douglas |
Honorary titles
| Preceded by Granville Chetwynd-Stapylton | Colonel of the Queen's Royal Regiment (West Surrey); 1902–1914 | Succeeded by Sir Edward Hamilton |
