= Bloody Sunday (1900) =

Part of the Second Boer War

- Part of Battle of Paardeberg during the Second Boer War
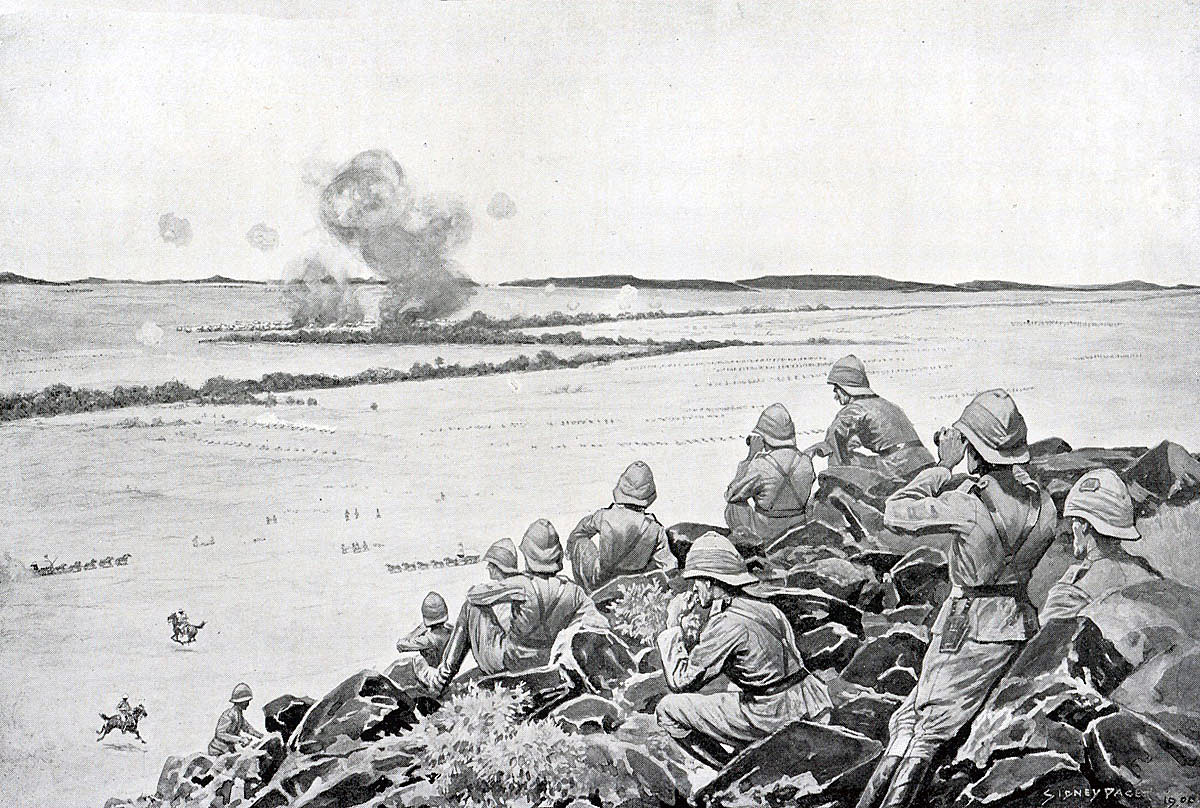
- Depiction of the British assault on Boer positions during Bloody Sunday
Date	18 February 1900
Location	Paardeberg Drift, Orange Free State 28°58′57″S 25°5′35″E
Result	First assault; Boer victory
Territorial changes	Boer reinforcements recapture Kitchener’s Kopje during a counter attack

Belligerents
United Kingdom; Canada	South African Republic; Orange Free State

Commanders and leaders
(United Kingdom) Herbert Kitchener	(South African Republic) Piet Cronjé

Strength
6,000 men	5,000 men

Casualties and losses
1,100 total, including; 280 dead	100 dead
- Location within South Africa

Bloody Sunday of February 18, 1900, was a day of high Imperial casualties in the Second Boer War.

== Background ==
It occurred on the first day of the Battle of Paardeberg. A combined British-Canadian force of 6,000 finally trapped a group of approximately 5,000 Boer soldiers and some civilians, under Piet Cronjé, in a bend of the Modder River near Kimberley, having advanced from south of the Modder River on the 11th. The Boers defended a series of trenches on Paardeberg Hill.

The Imperial commander, Kitchener (temporarily replacing the unwell Roberts), began the battle by ordering a charge straight at the Boer trenches. The land sloped down to the Boer position and lacked any cover for 800 metres (870 yd) or more. The Highland Brigade and the 2nd (Special Service) Battalion, The Royal Canadian Regiment of Infantry, led the attack.

The Boer soldiers withheld fire until British and Canadian soldiers were within 100 metres (110 yd). The British were pinned and the exchange of fire continued until nightfall when the British withdrew. The Highlanders took almost 300 casualties; the Canadian losses were 18 dead and 60 wounded. Attacks elsewhere along the line resulted in a total 1,100 casualties, with two hundred killed – the worst single day loss for the Imperial forces. Furthermore, Boer reinforcements under the command of General Christiaan de Wet counterattacked and managed to capture a stony hill overlooking British positions known as Kitchener’s Kopje.

After the first assault Roberts retook command that evening. With the Boers trapped he ordered the digging of trenches and a bombardment, which continued for nine days. On 27 February, after a confused night attack, the surviving Boer soldiers surrendered – around 4,000 in total.

A further 2,000 Imperial soldiers died or were invalided at Paardeberg from illness, mostly due to drinking the water of the Modder River, downstream from where the Boer were throwing horse and cattle corpses killed by the artillery fire.

== See also ==
- Military history of South Africa
- Black Week
