= Battle of Enslin =

The Battle of Enslin may refer to two different engagements:

- Battle of Graspan, also known as the Battle of Enslin, fought on 25 November 1899
- Battle of Enslin Station, fought on 6-7 December 1899
