= Naas Ferreira =

Boer War general

General Ignatius "(Oom) Naas" Stephanus Ferreira
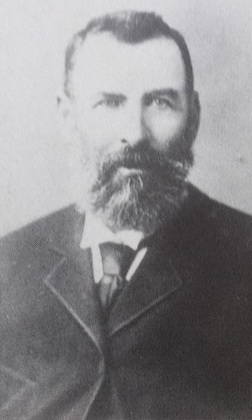

Personal details
- Born: 21 March 1844 Uitenhage dist. (Kariega)), Eastern Cape, South Africa
- Died: 18 February 1900 (aged 55) Paardeberg, Orange Free State, South Africa
- Spouse: Anna Margaretha Rademeyer (1843 – 1911)
- Parent(s): Petrus Marthinus Ferreira (1818 – 1898) and Christina Elizabeth Ferreira (1824 – 1904)
- Occupation: commander, combat general (Afrikaans: veggeneraal)
- Nickname: (Oom) Naas

Military service
- Allegiance: Orange Free State
- Battles/wars: Battle of Modder River; Battle of Magersfontein; Siege of Kimberley; Battle of Paardeberg †

Ignatius "(Oom) Naas" Stephanus Ferreira (21 March 1844 – 18 February 1900, Oom meaning Uncle in Afrikaans) was an Orange Free State Boer war general and Commander-in-Chief, who was fatally shot at the Battle of Paardeberg. Naas Ferreira should not be confused with his son and namesake Ignatius "Natie" Stephanus Ferreira (1875 – 1947), the gold miner Ignatius Philip Ferreira (1840 – 1921), and Boer general J. (Joachim) Ferreira (1835 – 1917).

== Family ==
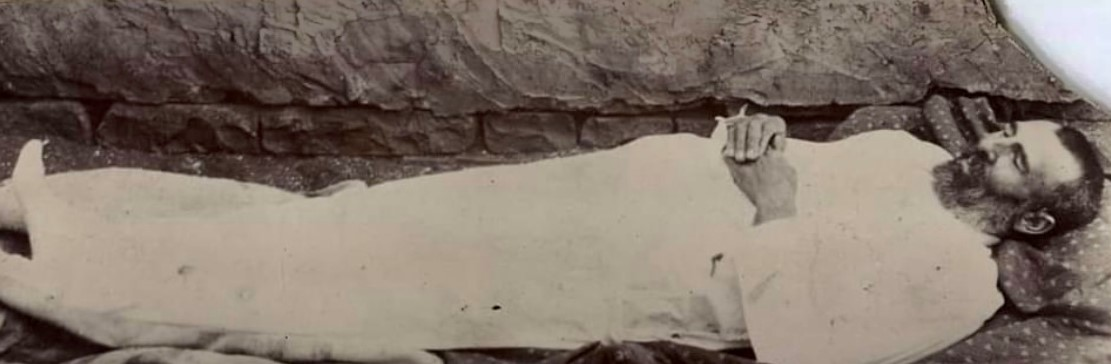
General Ignatius Stephanus Ferreira was accidentally shot in the stomach at Paardeberg, 1900.

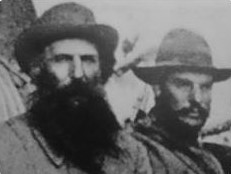
Boer general Koos de la Rey (left) with his secretary Ignatius "Natie" Stephanus Ferreira (1875 – 1947), a son of Naas Ferreira, around 1901.

Naas Ferreia was the eldest child among three sons and four daughters of Petrus Marthinus Ferreira (Uitenhage, Port Elizabeth, Eastern Cape, South Africa, 6 September 1818 – Winburg, Lejweleputswa, Orange Free State, August 23, 1898) and Christina Elizabeth Ferreira (Uniondale, Western Cape, 10 November 1824 – Senekal, Orange Free State, 11 March 1904). Ferreira married Anna Margaretha Rademeyer (Humansdorp, Western District, Eastern Cape, 14 October 1843 – Ladybrand, Motheo, Free State, 18 June 1911) and fathered three sons and two daughters.

== Military career ==
=== Orange Free State Commander in Chief ===
In the Second Boer War (1899 – 1902) Ferreira was the leader of the Ladybrand Commando and the Commander-in-Chief (Afrikaans: Hoofd Kommandant) of the Orange Free State. He took part in many early battles won by the Boers, such as the Battle of Modder River (Afrikaans: Slag van die Twee Riviere, lit. 'Battle of the two rivers', 28 November 1899), and the Battle of Magersfontein (11 December 1899). There he distributed the Boer troops more evenly over their hidden trenches for a maximum lethal result when the British under Lieutenant General Lord Methuen fatally attacked in a close formation.

On January 8, 1900, Ferreira was elected to take over the command of the Siege of Kimberley from Boer general Cornelis (Kerneels) Janse Wessels (11 January 1842 - 10 October 1914). However, when the British relief expedition of Lieutenant-General John French arrived, Ferreira was left with only 200 men and had to retreat, so that Kimberley was liberated on February 15, 1900. He then moved southwards with his troops near Boshof to join Christiaan de Wet's force, as it was thought that the British would try to break through eastward to Bloemfontein.

=== Killed at Paardeberg ===
At Paardeberg, Ferreira commanded the Boer burghers from Hoopstad and Ladybrand to help Piet Cronjé's 4000-odd troops escape from their embattled position in the north bank of the Modder River. However, when Ferreira was waking up a dozing guard in his camp in the early morning with the rifle butt, he was fatally shot in the stomach by accident when the startled guard instinctively groped the rifle. Ferreira was succeeded as commander-in-chief of the Orange Free State troops by Christiaan de Wet on February 19, 1900. Ferreira's son and namesake "Natie" continued to serve as a secretary to Boer general Koos de la Rey.

== Literature ==
- Basson JL (1987). "Ferreira, Ignatius Stephanus". In De Kock WJ, Krüger DW, Beyers CJ, Basson JL (eds.). Dictionary of South African Biography Vol V (1st ed.). Pretoria: Human Sciences Research Council. pp. 260–261. ISBN 0 7969 0420 0. OCLC 1063845175.
- Bossenbroek, M.P., Rosenberg, Yvette (Translator), The Boer War, Seven Stories Press, New York, NY, 2018. ISBN 9781609807474, 1609807472. Pages 214 – 215.
- Breytenbach, J. H. Die Geskiedenis van die Tweede Vryheidsoorlog in Suid-Afrika, 1899–1902, Die Staatsdrukker Pretoria, 1969–1996. Six volumes in Afrikaans.
  - Breytenbach, J. H. (1971). Die eerste Britse offensief, Nov. - Des. 1899 [The first British offensive, Nov. - Dec. 1899]. Die Geskiedenis van die Tweede Vryheidsoorlog in Suid-Afrika, 1899-1902 (in Afrikaans). Vol. II. Pretoria: Die Staatsdrukker. Pages 155, 356, and 405.
  - Breytenbach, J. H. (1977). Die Boereterugtog uit Kaapland [The Boer retreat from the Cape Colony]. Die Geskiedenis van die Tweede Vryheidsoorlog in Suid-Afrika, 1899-1902 (in Afrikaans). Vol. IV. Pretoria: Die Staatsdrukker. Ferreira is mentioned on 48 pages, including pages 82–83,....468-470, and 473.
  - Breytenbach, J. H. (1983). Die Britse Opmars tot in Pretoria [The British advance to Pretoria]. Die Geskiedenis van die Tweede Vryheidsoorlog in Suid-Afrika, 1899-1902 (in Afrikaans). Vol. V. Pretoria: Die Staatsdrukker. ISBN 9780621083606. OCLC 769254652. Pages 1 and 327.
- Hall, Darrell (1999). The Hall Handbook of the Anglo-Boer War, 1899-1902. Pietermaritzburg: University of Natal Press. ISBN 9780869809495. Pages 18 and 130.
- Pakenham, Thomas, The Boer War, George Weidenfeld & Nicolson, London, 1979. Abacus, 1992. ISBN 0 349 10466 2. "Ferreira, gen. J. S." (I.S. intended) is mentioned at pages 329–330, 333, and 387.
