= Modder River, Northern Cape =

Modder River Modderrivier
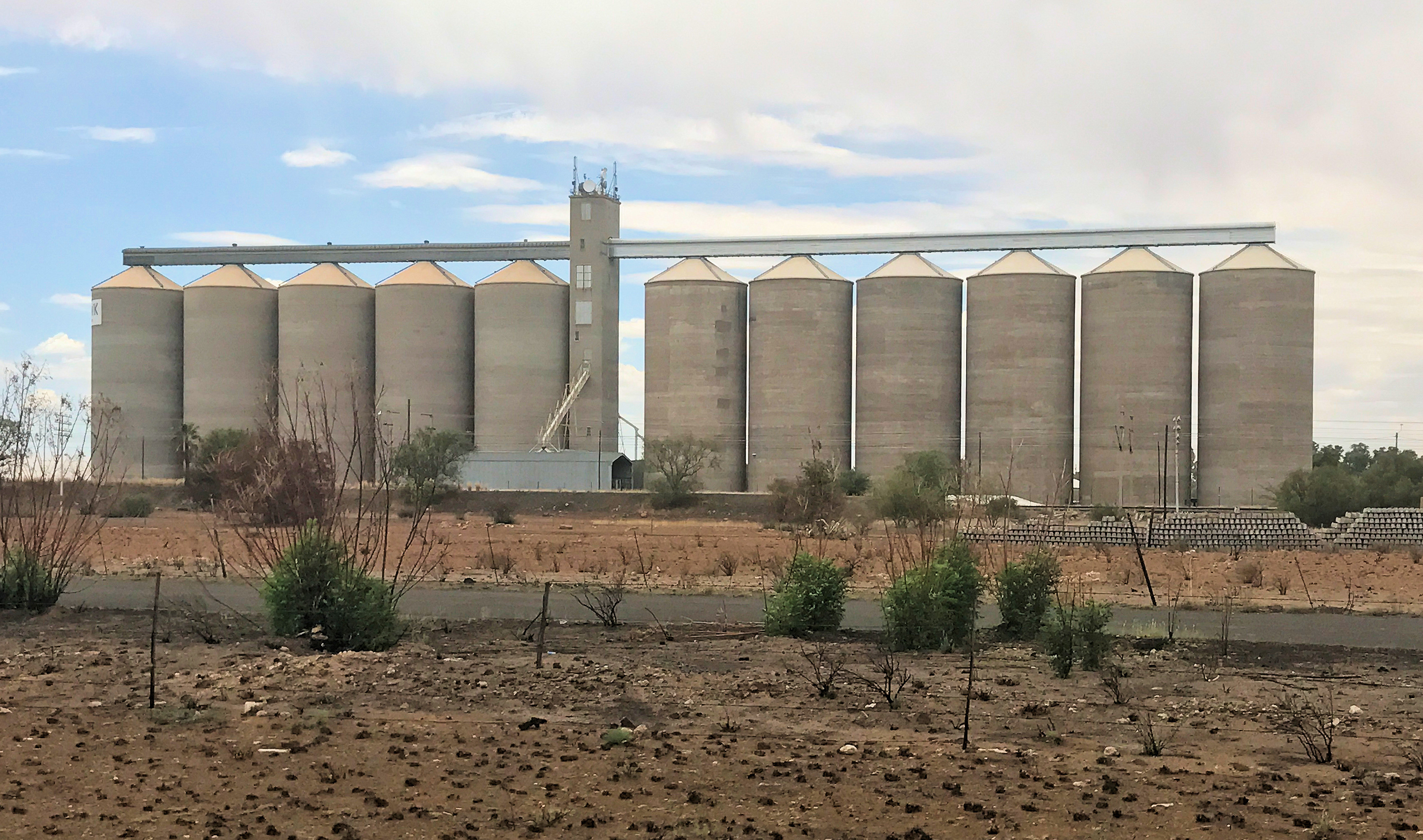
- Grain Silos, Modder River

- Location within Northern Cape Location within South Africa
- Coordinates: 29°01′48″S 24°37′35″E
- Country: South Africa
- Province: Northern Cape
- District: Frances Baard
- Municipality: Sol Plaatjie

Population
  - Total: 926
- Time zone: UTC+2 (SAST)
- PO box: 8700

Modder River (Afrikaans: Modderrivier; "modder" is Afrikaans for "mud") is an irrigation and stock farming town situated south of Kimberley near the confluence of the Riet and Modder rivers in the Northern Cape province of South Africa.

The Second Boer War Battle of Modder River took place here.
