= Battle of Modder River =

1899 battle of the Second Boer War

- Part of Second Boer War
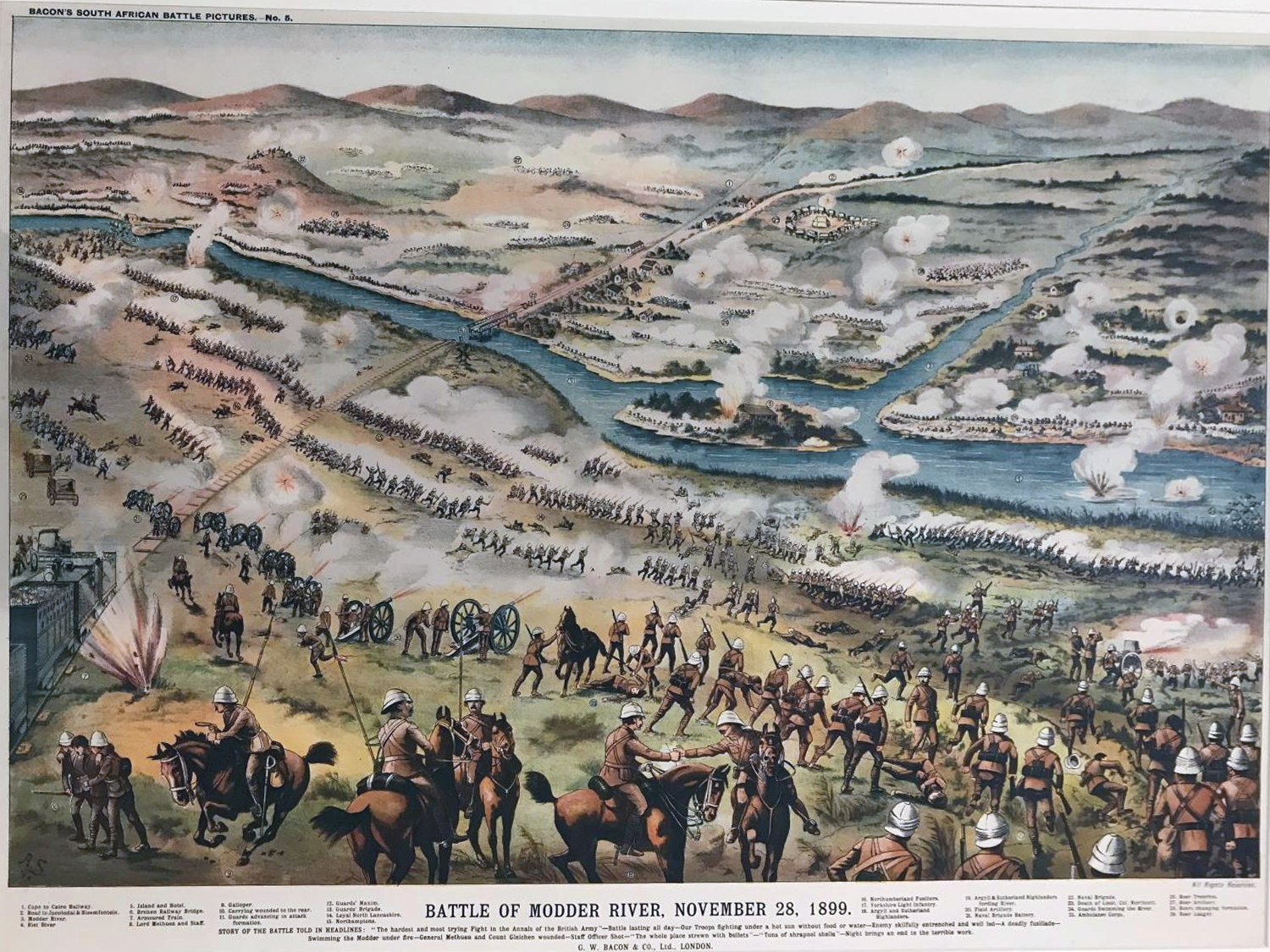
- Battle of Modder River, November 28, 1899. Bacon's South Africa War Prints No. 5. G. W. Bacon & Co, London. The illustration amplifies the British side.
Date	28 November 1899
Location	Modder River, Cape Colony 29°2′21″S 24°37′35″E
Result	British victory

Belligerents
United Kingdom	South African Republic; Orange Free State

Commanders and leaders
(United Kingdom of Great Britain and Ireland) Lord Methuen	(South African Republic) Piet Cronjé (South African Republic) Koos de la Rey (Orange Free State) Naas Ferreira (Orange Free State) Petrus Liebenberg

Strength
8,000; 20 guns	2,200–3,500; 4 guns 2 pom pom guns

Casualties and losses
71 killed +400 wounded 7 missing	75 killed or wounded

The Battle of Modder River (Afrikaans: Slag van die Twee Riviere, lit. 'Battle of the Two Rivers', fought near the confluence of the Modder and Riet Rivers) was an engagement in the Boer War, fought at Modder River, on 28 November 1899. A British column under Lord Methuen, that was attempting to relieve the besieged town of Kimberley, forced Boers under General Piet Cronjé to retreat to Magersfontein, but suffered heavy casualties altogether.

== Background ==
When the war broke out, one of the Boers' early targets was the diamond-mining centre of Kimberley, which stood not far from the point where the borders of the Boer republics of the Transvaal and the Orange Free State, and the British-controlled Cape Colony met. Although their forces surrounded the town, they did not press home any immediate assault. Nor did they attempt to cross the Orange River on this front to invade Cape Colony.

British troops crossing Modder River in 1899

Meanwhile, British reinforcements were on their way to South Africa. Their commander, General Sir Redvers Buller detached the 1st Division under Lieutenant General Lord Methuen to relieve the Siege of Kimberley. This decision was made partly for reasons of prestige, as the relief of Kimberley (which contained the famous Imperialist and former Prime Minister of Cape Colony, Cecil Rhodes) would be a major propaganda victory for the British.

During November, Methuen's force advanced north along the Western Cape Railway. They fought and won two engagements against Boers from the Orange Free State under General Prinsloo at the Battle of Belmont and at Graspan. At least one American, Lance Corporal Hollon Bush of the 7th Company, First Battalion Coldstream Guards was present and wounded at the Battle of Modder River. His journey to enlist from departure in New Orleans to England was not without many pitfalls before beginning service at the Tower of London, then on to Gibraltar and South Africa.

=== Boer plans ===
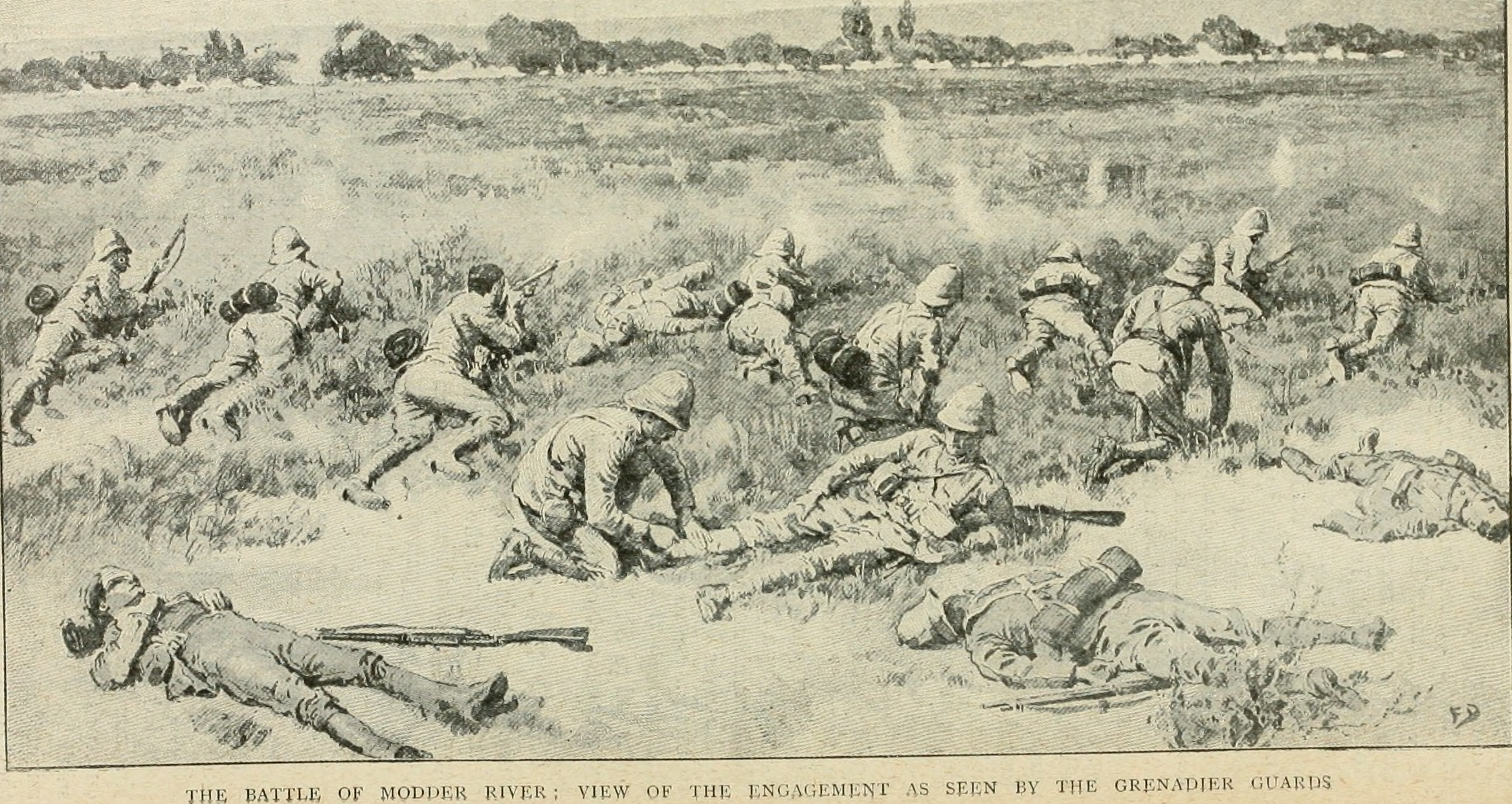
Battle of Modder River; view of the engagement as seen by the Grenadier Guards, from Forbes, Archibald, and Atteridge, A. H.: Battles of the nineteenth century, London; New York : Cassell and Company, 1901

The Boers had been reinforced by a substantial contingent from the Transvaal under General Koos de la Rey, who proposed a radical new plan of defence. He pointed out that the Boers had previously been easily driven from the kopjes (hills) which they had occupied. The kopjes had been obvious aiming marks for the numerically superior British artillery. Also, the trajectory of rifle fire from Boers on the top of the kopjes was steeply plunging. It therefore had a chance of hitting its target only in the last six feet or so of its flight. Once British infantry had reached the foot of the kopje, they were concealed by boulders and scrub, and could then easily drive the Boers off the summit with the bayonet.

De la Rey proposed to make use of the flat trajectory of the Mauser rifle with which the Boers were armed, together with the flat veld. He called on his men to dig trenches in the banks of the Modder River, from which their rifles could sweep the veld for a great distance, and won them over. General Piet Cronjé, who arrived later with the main Boer force, acquiesced in this novel plan.

The area contained two prominent hotels and the village of Rosmead, which was used as a resort by prominent businessmen from Kimberley. The Boer trenches were at 29°2′21″S 24°37′35″E on the south side of the Modder and the smaller Riet River which joined it at Modder River Station. The Boers had six field guns and one Maxim "pom-pom" (small rapid-firing gun) from the Orange Free State's Staatsartillerie (state artillery). They deployed these not as a concentrated battery, but as widely separated individual gun detachments north of the Modder and to the east. They had dug several emplacements for each gun, allowing their guns to switch position to avoid counter-battery fire.

=== British plans ===
Methuen's force consisted of two infantry brigades (the Guards Brigade under Major-General Sir Henry Edward Colville and the 9th Brigade under Major-General Reginald Pole-Carew), two mounted regiments, three batteries of field artillery (18th, 62nd and 75th) and four guns of the Naval Brigade. Further reinforcements were arriving up the railway.

The British cavalry (the 9th Lancers and a unit recruited in Cape Town, Rimington's Guides), made some attempts to scout the ground ahead of the army, but failed entirely to detect De la Rey's trenches and other preparations. (For example, the Boers had whitewashed stones on the veld or had placed biscuit tins as range markers). At 4:30 am on 28 November, Methuen's force roused itself, deployed into line and began advancing towards the Modder, with no plans other than to cross the river before having breakfast on the far side.

== Battle ==
Battle of Modder River

As the British troops came within 1,200 yards (1,100 m) of the river, Methuen remarked to Colville, "They're not here." Colville replied, "They're sitting uncommonly tight if they are". At this point the Boers opened fire. Most of the British troops were forced to throw themselves flat. Some tried to advance in short rushes, but could find no cover on the veld. Few British troops got closer than 1,000 yards (900 m) to the Boers. The Guards tried to outflank the Boer left, but were unable to ford the Riet River. The British guns pounded the buildings near Modder River Station and the line of poplar trees which marked the north bank of the Modder, and entirely missed the enemy trenches on the south bank. Meanwhile, the Boer guns maintained a galling fire, and kept in action by repeatedly moving their positions.

The battle became a day-long stalemate. Most of the British infantry lay prone on the veld, tortured by heat and thirst, but safe from enemy fire unless they moved. Many stoically smoked pipes or even slept. Methuen galloped about the field trying to renew the advance, and was himself wounded. At midday, some of Pole-Carew's 9th Brigade found the open Boer right flank at Rosmead drift (ford) downstream. British infantry infiltrated across the ford and about 1:00 pm drove the Boers out of Rosmead. The attack was disjointed, and suffered casualties when a British field artillery battery (62nd) which had just arrived on the field shelled them by mistake. By nightfall, De la Rey had driven them back into a small insecure bridgehead.

Nevertheless, the Boers feared that they were now vulnerable to being outflanked, and withdrew during the night.

== Aftermath ==
Methuen reported that the battle had been "one of the hardest and most trying fights in the annals of the British army". Although casualties had not been cripplingly heavy (between 450 and 480), mainly because the Boers opened fire prematurely, it was clear that any simple frontal attack by infantry only against an enemy using bolt-action rifles, was effectively impossible. The British were forced to pause for ten days, to evacuate their casualties, receive further reinforcements and repair their lines of communications. The delay allowed the Boers to construct the entrenchments which they were to defend in the Battle of Magersfontein.

On the Boer side, there were about 80 casualties, including, Adriaan, the eldest son of Koos de la Rey, mortally wounded by a shell.

== Account of the battle ==
Modder River – 28 November 1899
British Victory ~ Was a tiring day again with the heat and especially after forming at 4:30 am and being the 3rd battle in a week. Boers fled after British catch vital positions. Fiercest battle yet fought in the war. An almost impossible offensive task. The total Boer casualties may perhaps have amounted to 150, mainly due to shell-fire. 70 British were killed and another 413 were wounded.

— Arthur Conan Doyle, The Great Boer War (Smith, London 1900)

== In popular culture ==
The Iceman Cometh by Eugene O'Neil, Act One: "WETJOEN--(blurrily) Kaffir, dot's a nigger, Joe. (Joe stiffens and his eyes narrow. Wetjoen goes on with heavy jocosity.) Dot's joke on him, Joe. He don't know you. He's still plind drunk, the ploody Limey chentleman! A great mistake I missed him at the pattle of Modder River. Vit mine rifle I shoot damn fool Limey officers py the dozen, but him I miss. De pity of it! (He chuckles and slaps Lewis on his bare shoulder.) Hey, wake up, Cecil, you ploody fool! Don't you know your old friend, Joe? He's no damned Kaffir! He's white, Joe is!"

== See also ==
- Battle of Paardeberg
- Military history of South Africa
