= Riet River =

Riet Gmaap
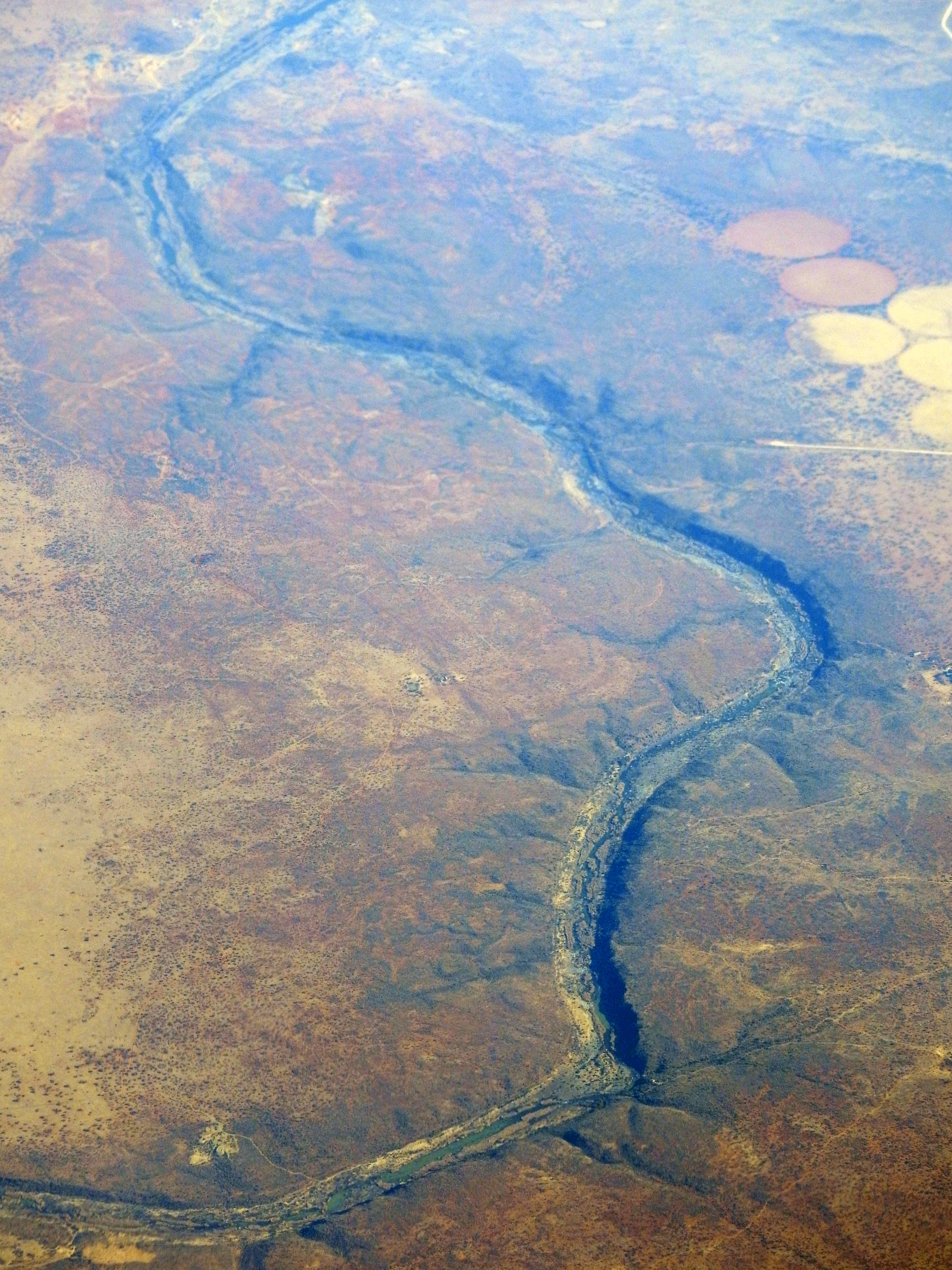
- Aerial view of the river in 2018.

- Location of the Riet River mouth
- Etymology: Native name Gama-!ab meaning 'muddy' in !Kora language
- Native name: Gama-!ab (Korana)

Location
- Country: South Africa
- Region: Free State, Northern Cape

Physical characteristics
- Source
  - location: Near Smithfield
- Mouth: Vaal River
  - location: Confluence
  - coordinates: 28°59′58″S 23°53′17″E
  - elevation: 1,001 m (3,284 ft)
- Length: 300 km (190 mi)

Basin features
- Tributaries
  - right: Modder River

The Riet River is a westward-flowing tributary of the Vaal River in central South Africa. In precolonial times the Riet was known as the Gama-!ab (or Gmaap), a !Kora name meaning 'muddy'. Its main tributary is the Modder River and after the confluence, the Riet River flows westwards to meet the Vaal.

The Riet flows about 300 km from the vicinity of the eastern Free State town of Smithfield and has a confluence with the Vaal River upstream from the Northern Cape town of Douglas. It flows through the Kalkfontein Dam. Water from the Orange River at Vanderkloof Dam is fed into the Riet River at Jacobsdal to provide water for irrigation. This has the combined effect of adding water to the river and lowering the salinity. When Vanderkloof Dam is spilling excess water from Vanderkloof Dam is transferred to the Kalkfontein Dam.

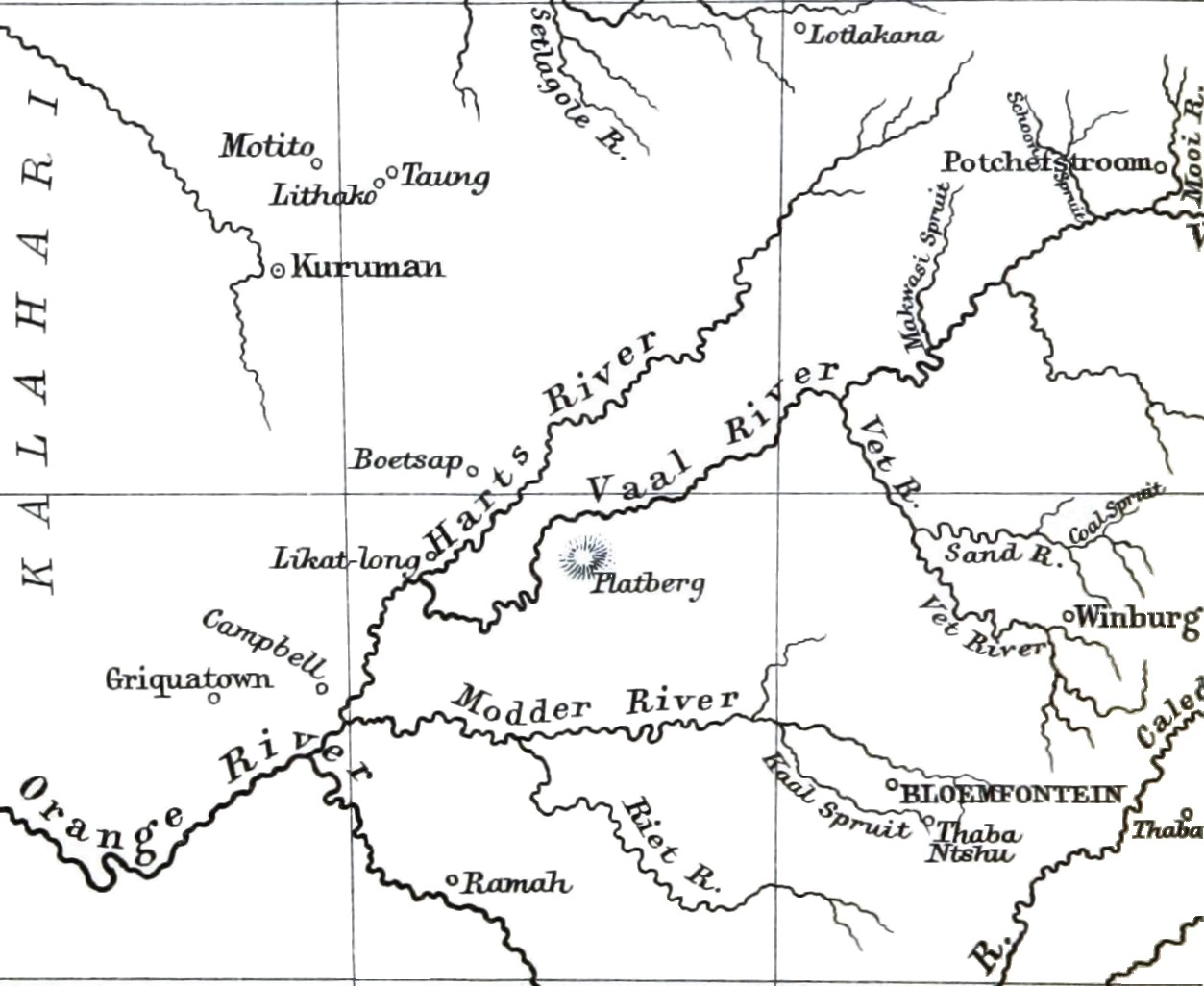
The Riet River on a map of 1887. The lower Modder has since become the lower Riet.

== See also ==
- List of rivers in South Africa
- Siege of Kimberley
- Battle of Paardeberg
