= Modder River =

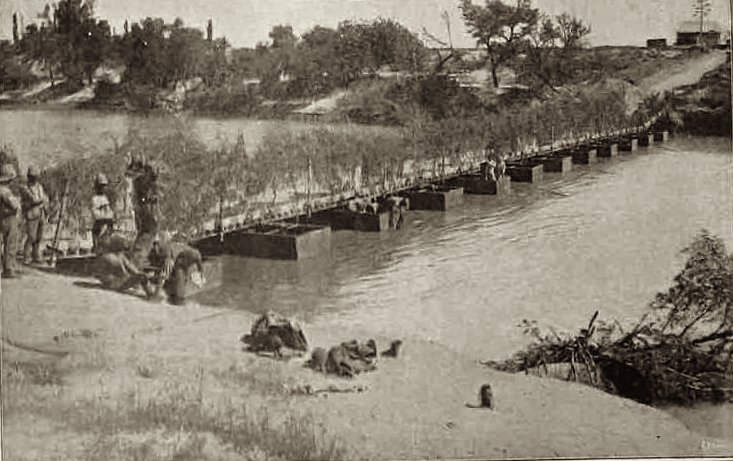
- Modder River pontoon bridge, 1899

- Location of the Modder River mouth
- Etymology: Modder meaning 'mud' in Afrikaans

Location
- Country: South Africa
- Region: Free State, Northern Cape

Physical characteristics
- Mouth: Riet River
  - coordinates: 29°2′25″S 24°37′42″E
  - elevation: 1,114 m (3,655 ft)

The Modder River is a river in South Africa. It is a tributary of the Riet River that forms part of the border between the Northern Cape and the Free State provinces. The river's banks were the scenes of heavy fighting in the beginning of the Second Boer War at the Battle of Modder River.

There is an inhabited farming place named "Modder River" just north of the confluence between this river and the Riet.

The Modder River is used extensively for irrigation, including the Krugersdrift Dam near Bloemfontein.

== See also ==
- Battle of Modder River
- List of rivers of South Africa
