= Piet Cronjé =

South African Boer general (1836–1911)

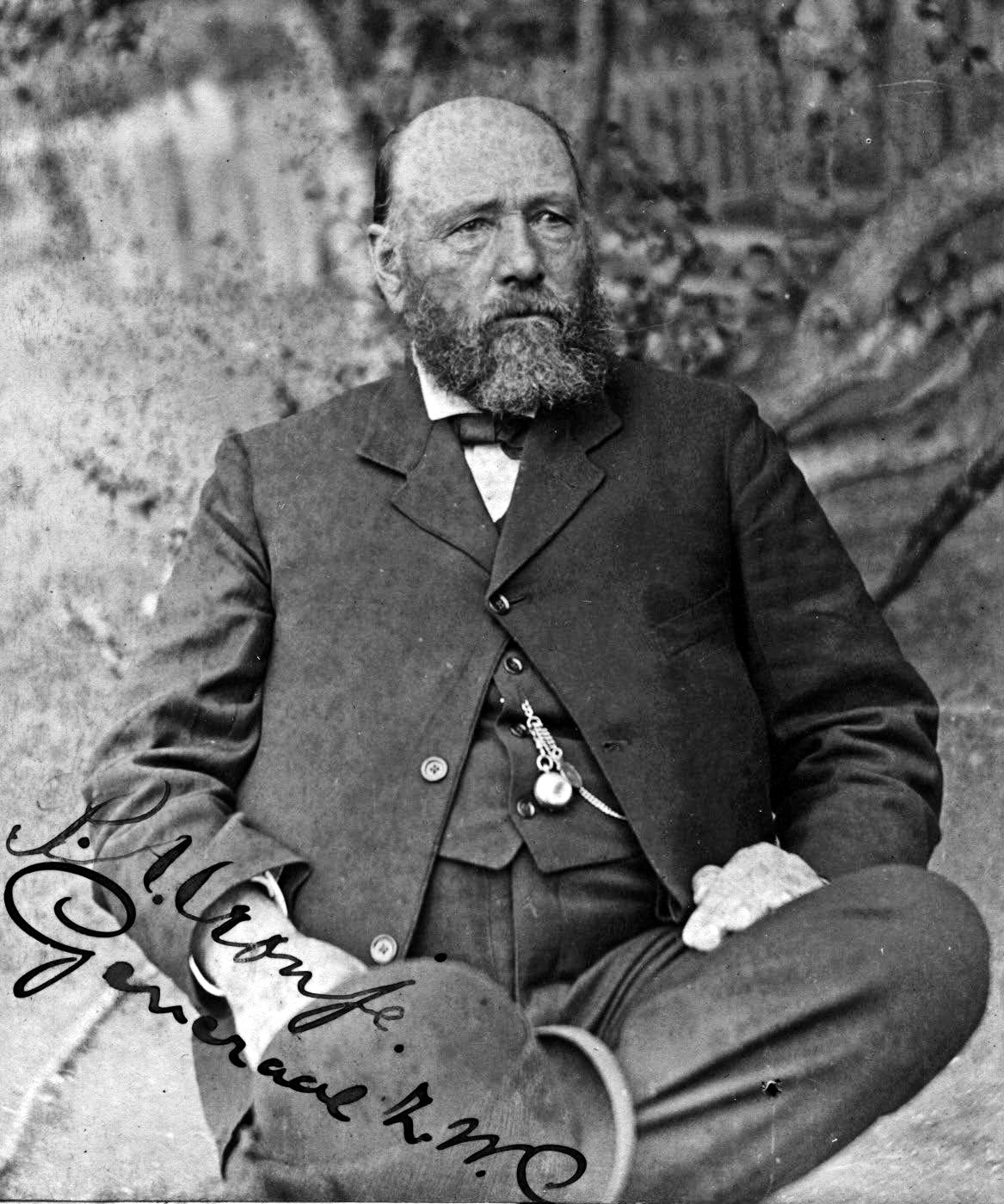
- Cronjé as a prisoner of war on Saint Helena, 1900–1902
- Born: Pieter Arnoldus Cronjé; 4 October 1836; Colesberg, Cape Colony
- Died: 4 February 1911 (aged 74); Klerksdorp, Transvaal, Union of South Africa
- Military career
- Allegiance: South African Republic
- Service years: 1880–1902
- Rank: General
- Wars: First Anglo-Boer War; Jameson Raid; Second Anglo-Boer War; Siege of Kimberley; Siege of Mafeking; Battle of Modder River; Battle of Magersfontein; Battle of Paardeberg (surrendered)

Pieter Arnoldus "Piet" Cronjé (4 October 1836 – 4 February 1911) was a South African Boer general during the Anglo-Boer Wars of 1880–1881 and 1899–1902.

== Biography ==
Born in the Cape Colony but raised in the South African Republic, Cronjé had a distinctive appearance, being short with a black beard and was reputed to have considerable personal courage. He made his reputation in the First Boer War, besieging the British garrison at Potchefstroom. He was unable to force their surrender until after the conclusion of the general armistice, and was at this time accused of withholding knowledge of this armistice from the garrison.

Cronjé was in command of the force that rounded up Leander Jameson at Doornkop at the conclusion of the Jameson Raid on 2 January 1896. During the Second Boer War, Cronjé was general commanding in the western theatre of war. He began the sieges of Kimberley and Mafeking. At Mafeking, with a force between 2,000 and 6,000 he laid siege against 1,200 regular troops and militia under the command of Colonel Robert Baden-Powell.

After Lord Methuen attempted to relieve the siege of Kimberley, Cronjé fought the Battle of Modder River on 28 November 1899, where the British won a Pyrrhic victory over the Boers. Cronjé's novel tactics at the Modder River, where his infantry were positioned at the base of the hills instead of at the tops—to increase the effectiveness of their rifles' flat trajectories—earned him a place in military history. However the tactics ascribed to him were not his own; he was convinced by General Koos de la Rey and President Martinus Theunis Steyn. After Modder River, Cronjé repulsed Methuen's forces at the Battle of Magersfontein on 11 December. This was actually due to De la Rey's tactics and planning; Cronjé sat idle in camp.

Cronjé was an attritionist and did not see the value in manoeuvre battles. He was defeated at the Battle of Paardeberg where he surrendered with 4,150 of his commandos on 27 February 1900, after being enveloped by Lord Roberts' forces. The commanding officer of the 3rd Battalion, the Grenadier Guards, Lieutenant Colonel Eyre Crabbe, was surprised to find that Cronjé had been accompanied on the campaign by his wife.

After his surrender he and his wife, Hester, were sent to a prison-of-war camp on Saint Helena, where he remained until the conclusion of peace negotiations in 1902. Boer morale sank after his defeat, with the capital of the Orange Free State, Bloemfontein, being taken without a shot being fired. He was a South African Freemason.

Cronjé was humiliated and shunned by the other Boer generals, ridiculed in the press, and was not asked to attend the peace talks at Vereeniging. He took part in the World Fair reenactments of the Anglo-Boer war at St. Louis in 1904. Dubbed a "circus general" by the South African press, he failed to return home at the time, instead joining a show on Coney Island, Brooklyn. He eventually returned to South Africa and died at Klerksdorp.
