= Paul Kruger =

South African politician (1825–1904)

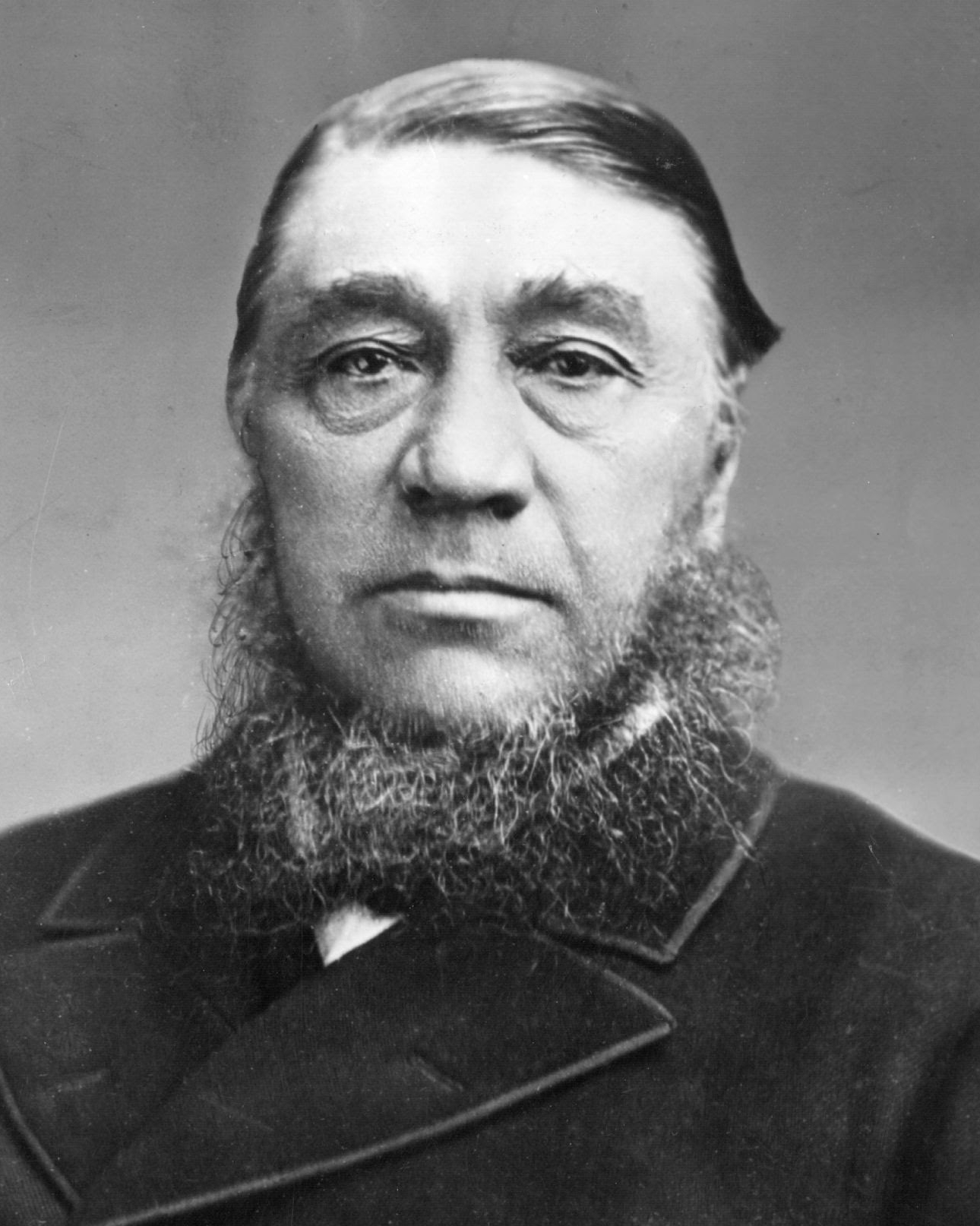
- Kruger c. 1890

5th State President of the South African Republic
- In office 9 May 1883 – 31 May 1902 In exile from 11 September 1900
- Vice President: Piet Joubert; Cornelis Johannes Bodenstein; Christiaan Johannes Joubert; Nicolaas Smit; Piet Joubert; Schalk Willem Burger
- Preceded by: Triumvirate
- Succeeded by: Schalk Willem Burger (acting) Office abolished

Member of the Triumvirate
- In office 8 August 1881 – 9 May 1883 Serving with Marthinus Pretorius and Piet Joubert
- Preceded by: Thomas Burgers (as President)

Personal details
- Born: Stephanus Johannes Paulus Kruger; 10 October 1825 Steynsburg, Cape Colony (now South Africa)
- Died: 14 July 1904 (aged 78) Clarens, Switzerland
- Resting place: Heroes' Acre, Pretoria
- Height: 170 cm (5 ft 7 in)
- Spouses: Maria du Plessis (m. 1842; died 1846); Gezina du Plessis (m. 1847; died 1901)
- Children: 18

Stephanus Johannes Paulus Kruger (Afrikaans pronunciation: [ˈkry.(j)ər]; 10 October 1825 – 14 July 1904) was a South African politician. He was one of the dominant political and military figures in 19th-century South Africa, and State President of the South African Republic (or Transvaal) from 1883 to 1900. Nicknamed "Oom Paul" (Afrikaans for 'Uncle Paul'), he came to international prominence as the face of the Boer cause—that of the Transvaal and its neighbour the Orange Free State—against Britain during the Second Boer War of 1899–1902. He has been called a personification of Afrikanerdom and admirers venerate him as a tragic folk hero.

Born near the eastern edge of the Cape Colony, Kruger took part in the Great Trek as a child during the late 1830s. He had almost no education apart from the Bible. A protégé of the Voortrekker leader Andries Pretorius, he witnessed the signing of the Sand River Convention with Britain in 1852 and over the next decade played a prominent role in the forging of the South African Republic, leading its commandos and resolving disputes between the rival Boer leaders and factions. In 1863 he was elected Commandant-General, a post he held for a decade; he resigned soon after the election of President Thomas François Burgers.

Kruger was appointed vice president in March 1877, shortly before the South African Republic was annexed by Britain as the Transvaal. Over the next three years he headed two deputations to London to try to have this overturned. He became the leading figure in the movement to restore the South African Republic's independence, culminating in the Boers' victory in the First Boer War of 1880–1881. Kruger served until 1883 as a member of an executive triumvirate, then was elected president. In 1884 he headed a third deputation that brokered the London Convention, under which Britain recognised the South African Republic as a completely independent state.

Following the influx of thousands of predominantly British settlers with the Witwatersrand Gold Rush of 1886, "uitlanders" (foreigners) provided almost all of the South African Republic's tax revenues but lacked civic representation; Boer burghers retained control of the government. The uitlander problem and the associated tensions with Britain dominated Kruger's attention for the rest of his presidency, to which he was re-elected in 1888, 1893 and 1898, and led to the Jameson Raid of 1895–1896 and ultimately the Second Boer War. Kruger left for Europe as the war turned against the Boers in 1900 and spent the rest of his life in exile, refusing to return home following the British victory. After he died in Switzerland at the age of 78 in 1904, his body was returned to South Africa for a state funeral, and buried in the Heroes' Acre in Pretoria.

== Early life ==
=== Family and childhood ===
Stephanus Johannes Paulus Kruger was born on 10 October 1825 at Bulhoek, a farm in the Steynsburg area of the Cape Colony, the third child and second son of Casper Jan Hendrik Kruger (1801–1852), a farmer, and his wife Elsje (Elisa; née Steyn; 1806–1834). The family was of Dutch-speaking Afrikaner background, and of German, French Huguenot and Dutch stock. They also had some Khoi ancestry as descendants of the colonial era South African interpreter Krotoa.

The Kruger family’s paternal ancestors had lived in South Africa since 1713, when Jacob Krüger, from Berlin, arrived in Cape Town as a 17-year-old soldier in the Dutch East India Company's service. Jacob's children dropped the umlaut from the family name, a common practice among South Africans of German origin. Over the following generations, Kruger's paternal forebears moved into the interior. His mother's family, the Steyns, had lived in South Africa since 1668 and were relatively affluent and cultured by Cape standards. Kruger's great-grand-uncle Hermanus Steyn had been president of the self-declared Republic of Swellendam that revolted against Company rule in 1795.

Bulhoek, Kruger's birthplace, was the Steyn family farm and had been Elsie's home since early childhood; her father Douw Gerbrand Steyn had settled there in 1809. The Kruger and Steyn families were acquainted and Casper occasionally visited Bulhoek as a young man. He and Elsie married in Cradock in 1820, when he was 19 and she was 14. (Note: As Elsie was below marriageable age, the union required written approval from both sets of parents and the bride herself. Such early marriages were not uncommon among rural Boers at that time.) A girl, Sophia, and a boy, Douw Gerbrand, were born before Paul was born in 1825. His first two names, Stephanus Johannes, were chosen after his paternal grandfather, but rarely used. The provenance of the third given name, Paulus, "was to remain rather a mystery", Johannes Meintjes wrote in his 1974 biography of Kruger, "and yet the boy was always called Paul."

Paul Kruger was baptised at Cradock on 19 March 1826. Soon thereafter his parents acquired a farm of their own to the north-west at Vaalbank, near Colesberg, in the remote north-east of the Cape Colony. His mother died when he was eight; his father Casper soon remarried and had more children with his second wife, Heiletje (née du Plessis). Beyond reading and writing, which he learned from relatives, the only education Kruger received was three months of study under a travelling tutor, Tielman Roos, and Calvinist religious instruction from his father. In adulthood, Kruger would claim to have never read any book apart from the Bible.

=== Great Trek ===
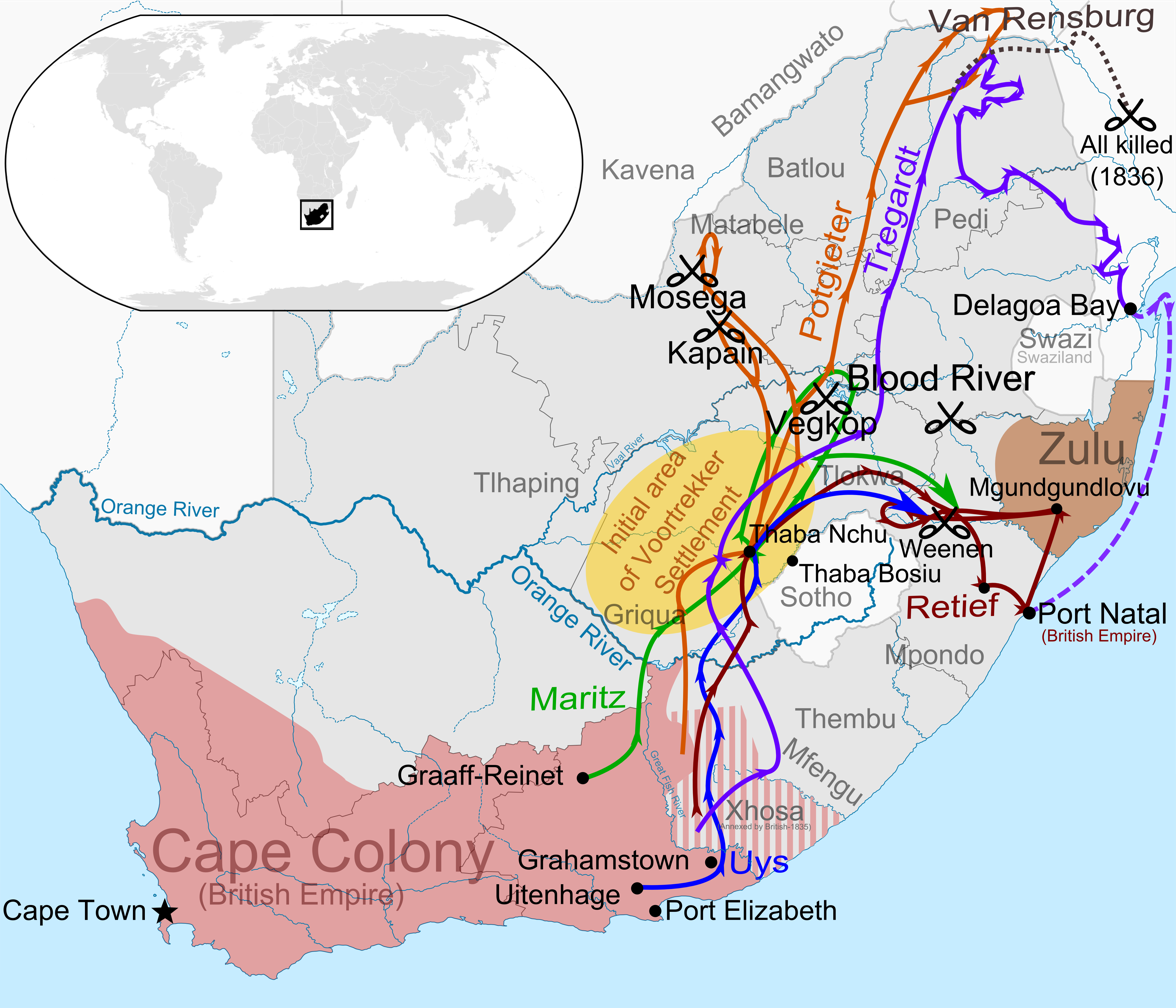
Great Trek routes of the 1830s and 1840s

In 1834 Casper Kruger, his father, and his brothers Gert and Theuns moved their families east and set up farms near the Caledon River, on the Cape Colony's far north-eastern frontier. The Cape had been under British sovereignty since 1814 when the Netherlands ceded it to Britain with the Convention of London. Boer discontent with aspects of British rule, such as the institution of English as the sole official language, led to the Great Trek—a mass migration by Dutch-speaking "Voortrekkers" north-east from the Cape to the land on the far side of the Orange and Vaal rivers. Many Boers had been expressing displeasure with the British Cape administration for some time, but the Krugers were comparatively content. They had always co-operated with the British, and had not owned slaves. They had given little thought to the idea of leaving the Cape.

A group of emigrants under Hendrik Potgieter passed through the Krugers' Caledon encampments in early 1836. Potgieter envisioned a Boer republic with himself in a prominent role; he sufficiently impressed the Krugers that they joined his party of Voortrekkers. Kruger's father continued to give the children religious education in the Boer fashion during the trek, having them recite or write down biblical passages from memory each day after lunch and dinner. At stops along the journey, the trekkers made improvised classrooms, marking them with reeds and grass. The more educated emigrants took turns in teaching.

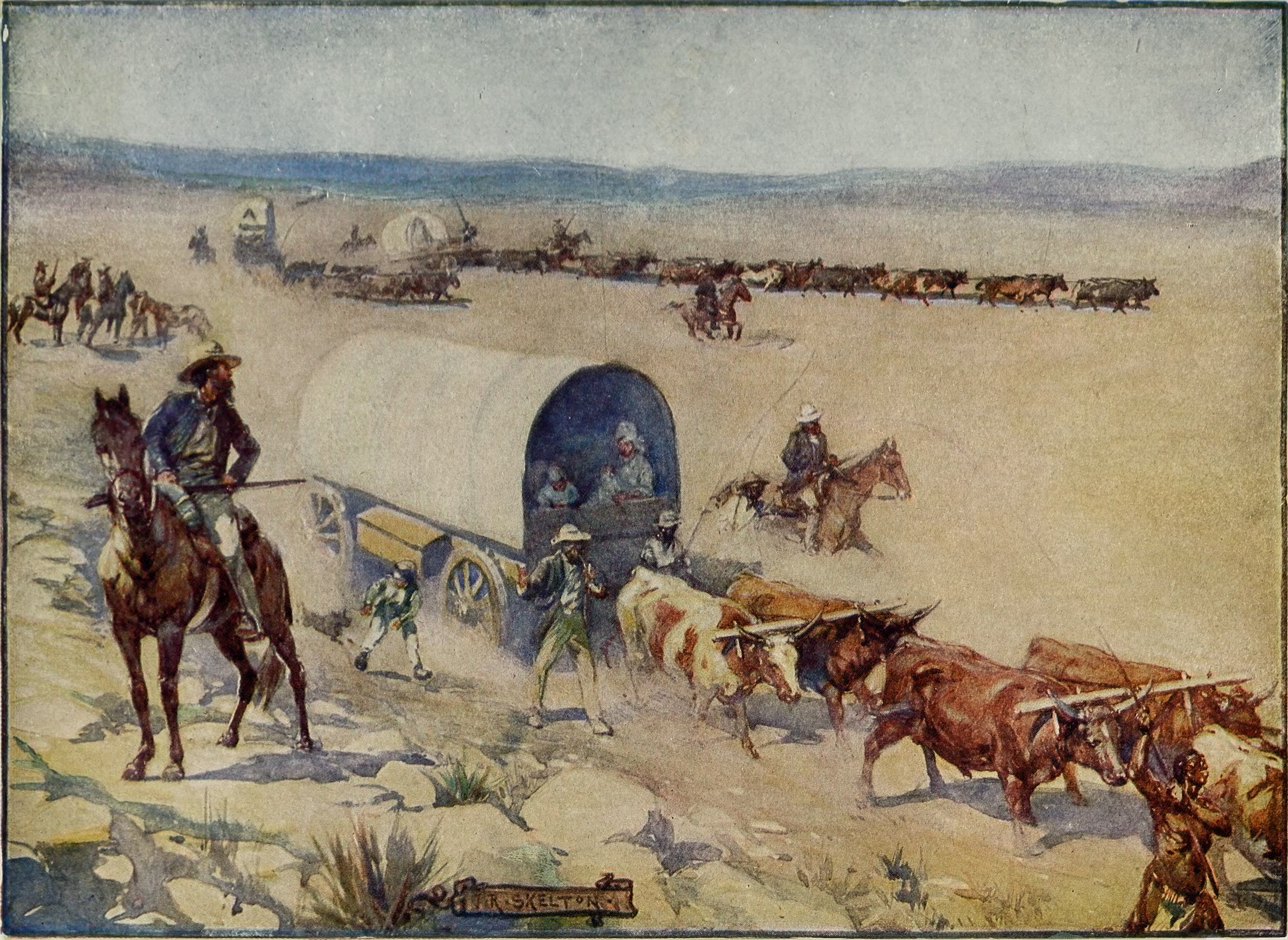
Voortrekkers; a 1909 depiction

The Voortrekkers faced indigenous competition for the area they were entering from Mzilikazi and his Ndebele (or Matabele) people, a branch from the Zulu Kingdom to the south-east. On 16 October 1836, the 11-year-old Kruger took part in the Battle of Vegkop, where Potgieter's laager, a circle of wagons chained together, was unsuccessfully attacked by Mzilikazi and around 4,000–6,000 Matabele warriors. Kruger and the other small children assisted in tasks such as bullet-casting, while the women and larger boys helped the fighting men, of whom there were about 40. Kruger could recall the battle in great detail and give a vivid account well into old age.

During 1837 and 1838 Kruger's family was part of the Voortrekker group under Potgieter that trekked further east into Natal. Here they met the American missionary Daniel Lindley, who gave young Paul much spiritual invigoration. The Zulu King Dingane concluded a land treaty with Potgieter. But he reconsidered and massacred first Piet Retief's party of settlers, then others at Weenen. Kruger later recounted his family's group coming under attack from Zulus soon after the Retief massacre, describing "children pinioned to their mothers' breasts by spears, or with their brains dashed out on waggon wheels". But "God heard our prayer", he recalled, and "we followed them and shot them down as they fled, until more of them were dead than those of us they had killed in their attack ... I could shoot moderately well for we lived, so to speak, among the game."

Because of the attacks, the Krugers returned to the highveld, where they took part in Potgieter's campaign that forced Mzilikazi to move his people north, across the Limpopo River, to what became Matabeleland. Kruger and his father settled at the foot of the Magaliesberg mountains in the Transvaal. In Natal Andries Pretorius defeated more than 10,000 of Dingane's Zulus at the Battle of Blood River on 16 December 1838, a date subsequently marked by the Boers as the Day of the Vow. (Note: Outnumbered about twenty-to-one, Pretorius won at Blood River without losing a single man—he suffered only three lightly wounded—while the Zulus sustained around 3,000 fatalities. This was widely interpreted by the trekkers as a miraculous event demonstrating divine support for the Boers.)

=== Burgher ===
Boer tradition of the time dictated that men were entitled to choose two 6,000-acre (24 km^{2}) farms—one for crops and one for grazing—upon becoming enfranchised burghers at the age of 16. Kruger set up his home at the farm Boekenhoutfontein, near Rustenburg in the Magaliesberg area. Kruger later became the owner of a piece of farmland named Waterkloof, on 30 September 1842. This concluded, he wasted little time in pursuing the hand of Maria du Plessis, the daughter of a fellow Voortrekker south of the Vaal; she was only 14 years old when they married in Potchefstroom in 1842. The same year Kruger was elected a deputy field cornet—"a singular honour at seventeen", Meintjes comments. This role combined the civilian duties of a local magistrate with a military rank equivalent to that of a junior commissioned officer.

Kruger was already an accomplished frontiersman, horseman, and guerrilla fighter. In addition to his native Dutch, he could speak basic English and several African languages, some fluently. He had shot a lion for the first time when he was a boy—in old age he recalled being 14, but Meintjes suggests he may have been as young as 11. During his many hunting excursions, Kruger was nearly killed on several occasions. In 1845, while he was hunting rhinoceros along the Steelpoort River, his four-bore elephant gun exploded in his hands and blew off most of his left thumb. Kruger wrapped the wound in a handkerchief and retreated to camp, where he treated it with turpentine. He refused calls to have the hand amputated by a doctor, and instead cut off the remains of the injured thumb himself with a pocketknife. When gangrenous marks appeared on his arm up to his shoulder, he placed the hand in the stomach of a freshly killed goat, a traditional Boer remedy. He considered this a success—"when it came to the turn of the second goat, my hand was already easier and the danger much less." The wound took more than six months to heal, but he did not wait that long to start hunting again.

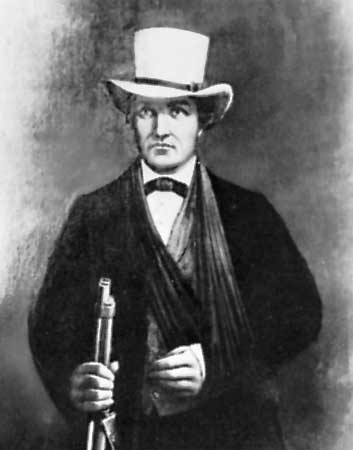
Andries Pretorius, a great influence on the young Kruger

Britain annexed the Voortrekkers' short-lived Natalia Republic in 1843 as the Colony of Natal. Pretorius briefly led Boer resistance to this, but before long most of the Boers in Natal had trekked back north-west to the area around the Orange and Vaal rivers. In 1845 Kruger was a member of Potgieter's expedition to Delagoa Bay in Mozambique to negotiate a frontier with Portugal; the Lebombo Mountains was settled upon as the border between Boer and Portuguese lands. Maria and their first child died of fever in January 1846. In 1847 Kruger married her cousin, Gezina du Plessis, from the Colesberg area. Their first child, Casper Jan Hendrik, was born on 22 December that year.

Concerned by the exodus of so many whites from the Cape and Natal, and taking the view that the Boers remained British subjects, the British Governor Sir Harry Smith in 1848 annexed the area between the Orange and Vaal rivers as the "Orange River Sovereignty". Pretorius led a Boer commando raid against this, and they were defeated by Smith at the Battle of Boomplaats. Like the Krugers, Pretorius lived in the Magaliesberg mountains and often hosted the young Kruger, who greatly admired the elder man's resolve, sophistication, and piety. A warm relationship developed. "Kruger's political awareness can be dated from 1850", Meintjes writes, "and it was in no small measure given to him by Pretorius." Like Pretorius, Kruger wanted to centralise the emigrants under a single authority and win British recognition for their territory as an independent state. This last point was not due to hostility to Britain—neither Pretorius nor Kruger was particularly anti-British—but because they perceived the emigrants' unity as under threat if the Cape administration continued to regard them as British subjects.

Henry Douglas Warden, the British Resident in the Orange River area, advised Smith in 1851 that he thought a compromise should be attempted with Pretorius. Smith sent representatives to meet him at the Sand River. Kruger, aged 26, accompanied Pretorius and on 17 January 1852 was present at the conclusion of the Sand River Convention, under which Britain recognised "the Emigrant Farmers" in the Transvaal as independent: they called themselves the Zuid-Afrikaansche Republiek ("South African Republic"). In exchange for the Boers' pledge not to introduce slavery in the Transvaal, the British agreed not to make an alliance with any "coloured nations" there. Kruger's uncle Gert was also present; his father Casper would have been as well but he was ill and unable to attend.

=== Field cornet ===
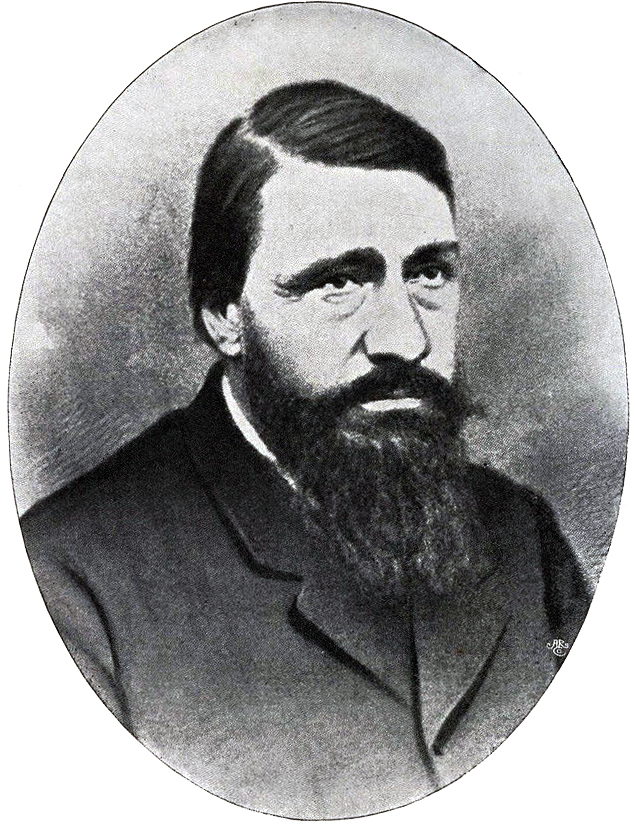
Kruger as a field cornet, photographed c. 1852

The Boer colonists and the local Tswana and Basotho chiefdoms were in near-constant conflict, mainly over land. Kruger was elected field cornet of his district in 1852, and in August that year he took part in the Battle of Dimawe, a raid against the Tswana chief Sechele I. The Boer commando was headed by Pretorius, but in practice he did not take much part as he was suffering from dropsy (edema). Kruger narrowly escaped death twice—first a piece of shrapnel hit him in the head but knocked him out without cutting him; later a Tswana bullet swiped across his chest, tearing his jacket but not wounding him. The commando wrecked David Livingstone's mission station at Kolobeng, destroying his medicines and books. Livingstone was away at the time. Kruger's version of the story was that the Boers found an armoury and a workshop for repairing firearms in Livingstone's house and, interpreting this as a breach of Britain's promise at the Sand River not to arm tribal chiefs, confiscated them. Whatever the truth, Livingstone wrote about the Boers in strongly condemnatory terms thereafter, depicting them as mindless barbarians.

Livingstone and many others criticised the Boers for abducting women and children from tribal settlements and taking them home to work as slaves. The Boers argued that they did not keep these captives as slaves but as inboekelings—indentured "apprentices" who, having lost their families, were given bed, board and training in a Boer household until reaching adulthood. Modern scholarship widely dismisses this as a technical ruse by the Boers to enforce a means of inexpensive labour for them while avoiding overt slavery. (Note: The Boers contended that given the heavy casualties among their enemies, this was a better way to treat the widows and orphans rather than to abandon them in the villages. Inboekelings were sometimes obtained in exchange for land, food or other goods. Under the laws passed in the Transvaal, males were supposed to be let go at the age of 25 and females at 21, but this was not always observed in the more remote districts. Even when the natives were released, many chose to stay with the Boers.) Gezina Kruger had an inboekeling maid for whom she eventually arranged marriage, and paid her a dowry.

Having been promoted to the rank of lieutenant (between field cornet and commandant), Kruger formed part of a commando sent against the chief Montshiwa in December 1852 to recover some stolen cattle. Pretorius was still sick, and only nominally in command. Seven months later, on 23 July 1853, Pretorius died, aged 54. Just before the end he sent for Kruger, but the young man arrived too late. Meintjes says that Pretorius "was perhaps the first person to recognise that behind [Kruger's] rough exterior was a most singular person with an intellect all the more remarkable for being almost entirely self-developed".

== Commandant ==
Pretorius did not name a successor as Commandant-General; his eldest son, Marthinus Wessel Pretorius, was appointed in his stead. The younger Pretorius elevated Kruger to the rank of commandant. Pretorius, the son, claimed power over not just the Transvaal but also the Orange River area—he said the British had promised it to his father—but virtually nobody, not even supporters like Kruger, accepted this. Following Sir George Cathcart's replacement of Smith as governor in Cape Town, the British policy towards the Orange River Sovereignty changed to the extent that the British were willing to pull out and grant independence to a second Boer republic there. This was in spite of the fact that in addition to the Boer settlers, there were many English-speaking colonists who wanted rule from the Cape to continue. On 23 February 1854 Sir George Russell Clerk signed the Orange River Convention, ending the sovereignty and recognising what the Boers dubbed the Oranje-Vrijstaat ("Orange Free State").

Bloemfontein, the former British garrison town, became the Free State's capital; the Transvaal seat of government became Pretoria, named after the elder Pretorius. The South African Republic was in practice split between the south-west and central Transvaal, where most of Pretorius' supporters were, and regionalist factions in the Zoutpansberg, Lydenburg and Utrecht districts that viewed any central authority with suspicion. Kruger's first campaign as a commandant was in the latter part of 1854, against the chiefs Mapela and Makapan near the Waterberg. The chiefs retreated into what became called the Caves of Makapan ("Makapansgat") with many of their people and cattle, and a siege ensued in which thousands of the defenders died, mainly from starvation. When Commandant-General Piet Potgieter of Zoutpansberg was shot dead, Kruger advanced under heavy fire to retrieve the body and was almost killed himself.

=== Mediator ===
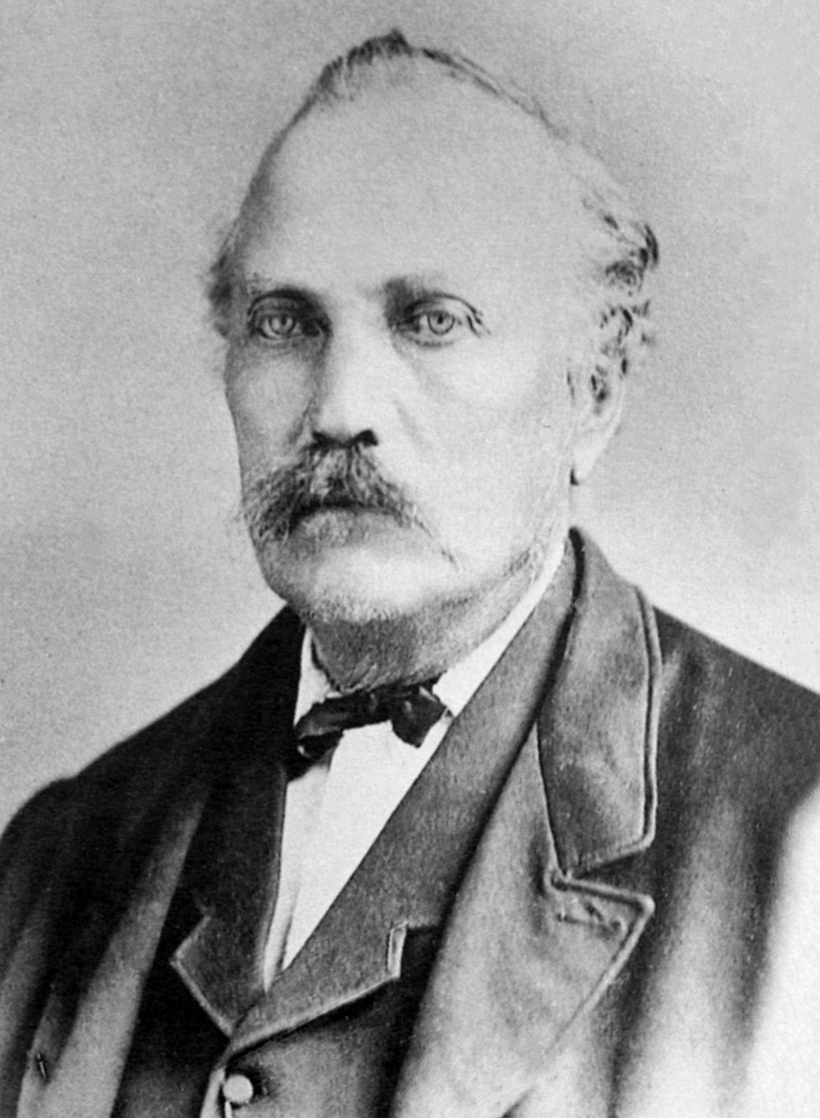
M W Pretorius, who became the Transvaal's first President in 1857

Marthinus Pretorius hoped to achieve either federation or amalgamation with the Orange Free State, but before he could contemplate this he would have to unite the Transvaal. In 1855 he appointed an eight-man constitutional commission, including Kruger, which presented a draft constitution in September that year. Lydenburg and Zoutpansberg rejected the proposals, calling for a less centralised government. Pretorius tried again during 1856, holding meetings with eight-man commissions in Rustenburg, Potchefstroom and Pretoria, but Stephanus Schoeman, Zoutpansberg's new Commandant-General, repudiated these efforts.

The constitution settled upon formalised a national Volksraad (parliament) and created an executive council, headed by a president. Pretorius was sworn in as the first president of the South African Republic on 6 January 1857. Kruger successfully proposed Schoeman for the post of national Commandant-General, hoping to thereby end the factional disputes and foster unity, but Schoeman categorically refused to serve under this constitution or Pretorius. With the Transvaal on the verge of civil war, tensions also rose with the Orange Free State after Pretorius's ambitions of absorbing it became widely known. Kruger had strong personal reservations about Pretorius, not considering him his father's equal, but nevertheless remained steadfastly loyal to him.

After the Free State government dismissed an ultimatum from Pretorius to cease what he regarded as the marginalisation of his supporters south of the Vaal, Pretorius called up the burghers and rode to the border, prompting President Jacobus Nicolaas Boshoff of the Free State to do the same. Kruger was dismayed to learn of this and on reaching the Transvaal commando he spoke out against the idea of fighting their fellow Boers. When he learned that Boshoff had called on Schoeman to lead a commando against Pretorius from Zoutpansberg and Lydenburg, he realised that disbanding was no longer enough and that they would have to make terms.

With Pretorius's approval, Kruger met Boshoff under a white flag. Kruger made clear that he personally disapproved of Pretorius's actions and the situation as a whole, but defended his president when the Free Staters began to speak harshly of him. A commission of 12 men from each republic, including Kruger, reached a compromise whereby Pretorius would drop his claim on the Free State, and a treaty was concluded on 2 June 1857. (Note: When two Free State burghers who had taken Pretorius's side were soon thereafter sentenced to hang for high treason, Kruger went to Bloemfontein at Pretorius's request and persuaded the Free State government to commute the death sentences to fines, which he then even had reduced.) Over the next year Kruger helped to negotiate a peace agreement between the Free State and Moshoeshoe I of the Basotho, and persuaded Schoeman to take part in successful talks regarding constitutional revisions, after which Zoutpansberg accepted the central government with Schoeman as commandant-general. On 28 June 1858 Schoeman appointed Kruger Assistant Commandant-General of the South African Republic. "All in all", Kruger's biographer T R H Davenport comments, "he had shown a loyalty to authority in political disputes, devotion to duty as an officer, and a real capacity for power play."

=== Forming the "Dopper Church" ===
Kruger considered Providence his guide in life and referred to scripture constantly; he knew large sections of the Bible by heart. He understood the biblical texts literally and inferred from them that the Earth was flat, a belief he retained firmly to his dying day. At mealtimes he said grace twice, at length and in formal Dutch rather than the South African dialect that was to become Afrikaans. In late 1858, when he returned to Boekenhoutskloof, he was mentally and physically drained following the exertions of the past few years and in the midst of a spiritual crisis. Hoping to establish a personal relationship with God, he ventured into the Magaliesberg and spent several days without food or water. A search party found him "nearly dead from hunger and thirst", Davenport records. The experience reinvigorated him and greatly intensified his faith, which for the rest of his life was unshakeable and, according to Meintjes, perceived by some of his contemporaries as like that of a child.

Kruger belonged to the "Doppers"—a group of about 6,000 that followed an extremely strict interpretation of traditional Calvinist doctrine. They based their theology almost entirely on the Old Testament and, among other things, wished to eschew hymns and organs and read only from the Psalms. When the 1859 synod of the Nederduits Hervormde Kerk van Afrika (NHK), the main church in the Transvaal, decided to enforce the singing of modern hymns, Kruger led a group of Doppers that denounced the NHK as "deluded" and "false" and left its Rustenburg congregation. They formed the Gereformeerde Kerke van Zuid-Afrika (GK), thereafter known informally as the "Dopper Church", and recruited the Reverend Dirk Postma, a like-minded traditionalist recently arrived from the Netherlands, to be their minister. This act also had secular ramifications as according to the 1858 constitution only NHK members could take part in public affairs.

=== Civil war; Commandant-General ===
In late 1859 Pretorius was invited to stand for president in the Orange Free State, where many burghers now favoured union, partly as a means to overcome the Basotho. The Transvaal constitution he had just enacted made it illegal to simultaneously hold office abroad, but nevertheless he readily did so and won. The Transvaal volksraad attempted to side-step the constitutional problems surrounding this by granting Pretorius half a year's leave, hoping a solution might come about during this time, and the President duly left for Bloemfontein, appointing Johannes Hermanus Grobler to be acting president in his absence. Pretorius was sworn in as president of the Free State on 8 February 1860; he sent a deputation to Pretoria to negotiate union the next day.

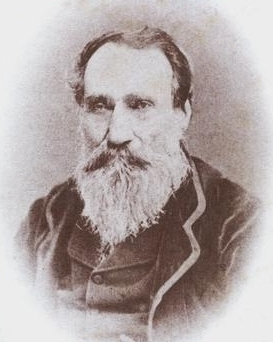
Stephanus Schoeman, a fierce opponent of Kruger during the 1860s

Kruger and others in the Transvaal government disliked Pretorius's unconstitutional dual presidency, and worried that Britain might declare the Sand River and Orange River Conventions void if the republics joined. Pretorius was told by the Transvaal volksraad on 10 September 1860 to choose between his two posts—to the surprise of both supporters and detractors he resigned as President of the Transvaal and continued in the Free State. After Schoeman unsuccessfully attempted to forcibly supplant Grobler as Acting President, Kruger persuaded him to submit to a volksraad hearing, where Schoeman was censured and relieved of his post. Willem Cornelis Janse van Rensburg was appointed Acting President while a new election was organised for October 1862. Having returned home, Kruger was surprised to receive a message urgently requesting his presence in the capital, the volksraad having recommended him as a suitable candidate; he replied that he was pleased to be summoned but his membership in the Dopper Church meant he could not enter politics. Van Rensburg promptly had legislation passed to give equal political rights to members of all Reformed denominations.

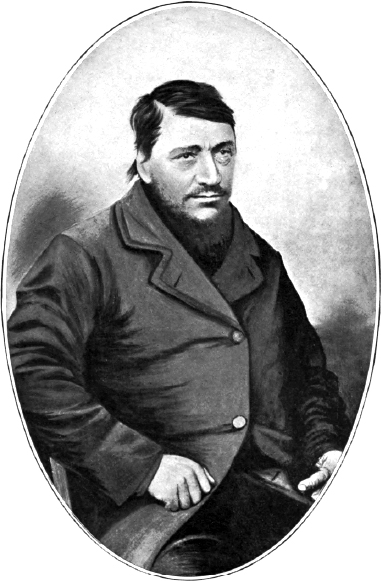
Kruger, photographed as Commandant-General of the South African Republic, c. 1865. The loss of his left thumb is visible.

Schoeman mustered a commando at Potchefstroom, but was routed by Kruger on the night of 9 October 1862. After Schoeman returned with a larger force Kruger and Pretorius held negotiations where it was agreed to hold a special court on the disturbances in January 1863, and soon thereafter fresh elections for president and commandant-general. Schoeman was found guilty of rebellion against the state and banished. In May the election results were announced—Van Rensburg became president, with Kruger as commandant-general. Both expressed disappointment at the low turnout and resolved to hold another set of elections. Van Rensburg's opponent this time was Pretorius, who had resigned his office in the Orange Free State and returned to the Transvaal. Turnout was higher and on 12 October the volksraad announced another Van Rensburg victory. Kruger was returned as commandant-general with a large majority. The civil war ended with Kruger's victory over Jan Viljoen's commando, raised in support of Pretorius and Schoeman, at the Crocodile River on 5 January 1864. Elections were held yet again, and this time Pretorius defeated Van Rensburg. Kruger was re-elected as commandant-general with over two-thirds of the vote.

The civil war had led to an economic collapse in the Transvaal, weakening the government's ability to back up its professed authority and sovereignty over the local chiefdoms, though Lydenburg and Utrecht did now accept the central administration. By 1865 tensions had risen with the Zulus to the east and war had broken out again between the Orange Free State and the Basotho. Pretorius and Kruger led a commando of about 1,000 men south to help the Free State. The Basotho were defeated and Moshoeshoe ceded some of his territory, but President Johannes Brand of the Free State decided not to give any of the conquered land to the Transvaal burghers. The Transvaal men were scandalised and returned home en masse, despite Kruger's attempts to maintain discipline. The following February, after a meeting of the executive council in Potchefstroom, Kruger capsized his cart during the journey home and broke his left leg. On one leg he righted the cart and continued the rest of the way. This injury incapacitated him for the next nine months, and his left leg was thereafter slightly shorter than his right.

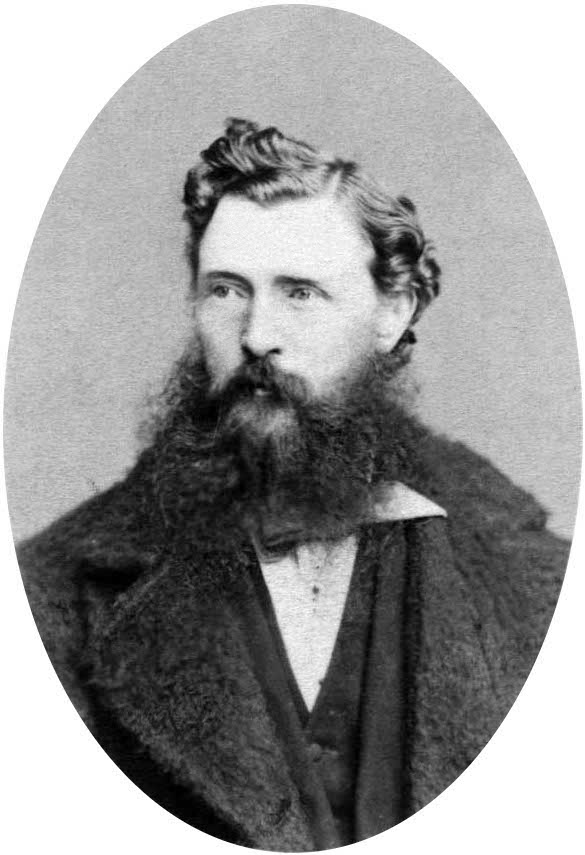
President Thomas François Burgers, whose election dismayed Kruger

In 1867, Pretoria sent Kruger to restore law and order in Zoutpansberg. He had around 500 men but very low reserves of ammunition, and discipline in the ranks was poor. On reaching Schoemansdal, which was under threat by the chief Katlakter, Kruger and his officers resolved that holding the town was impossible and ordered a general evacuation, following which Katlakter razed the town. The loss of Schoemansdal, once a prosperous settlement by Boer standards, was considered a great humiliation by many burghers. The Transvaal government formally exonerated Kruger over the matter, ruling that he had been forced to evacuate Schoemansdal by factors beyond his control, but some still argued that he had given the town up too readily. Peace returned to Zoutpansberg in 1869, following the intervention of the republic's Swazi allies.

Pretorius stepped down as president in November 1871. In the 1872 election Kruger's preferred candidate, William Robinson, was decisively defeated by the Reverend Thomas François Burgers, a church minister from the Cape who was noted for his eloquent preaching but controversial for some because of his liberal interpretation of the scriptures. He did not believe in the Devil, for example. (Note: The Doppers despised Burgers, denouncing him as "Godless"; some even called him the Antichrist.) Kruger publicly accepted Burgers's election, announcing at his inauguration that "as a good republican" he submitted to the vote of the majority, but he had grave personal reservations regarding the new president. He particularly disliked Burgers's new education law, which restricted children's religious instruction to outside school hours—in Kruger's view an affront to God. This, coupled with the sickness of Gezina and their children with malaria, caused Kruger to lose interest in his office. In May 1873 he requested an honourable discharge from his post, which Burgers promptly granted. The office of commandant-general was abolished the following week. Kruger moved his main residence to Boekenhoutfontein, near Rustenburg, and for a time absented himself from public affairs. (Note: Kruger had owned Boekenhoutfontein since 1860. He retained Waterkloof as well; he would own both properties for the rest of his life, while acquiring and selling many others.)

== Diamonds and deputations ==
=== Under Burgers ===
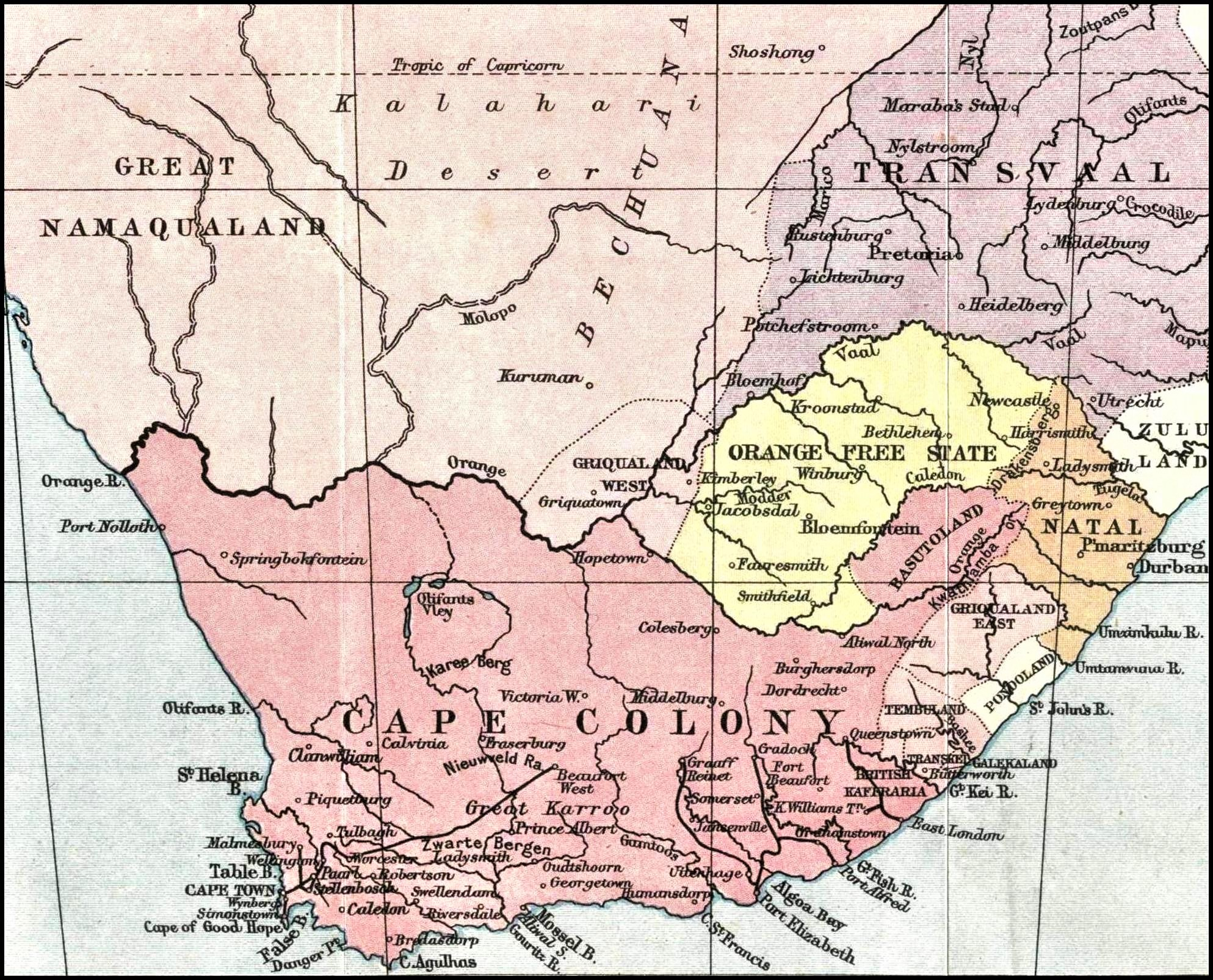
South Africa in 1878

Burgers busied himself attempting to modernise the South African Republic along European lines, hoping to set in motion a process that would lead to a united, independent South Africa. Finding Boer officialdom inadequate, he imported ministers and civil servants en masse from the Netherlands. His ascent to the presidency came shortly after the realisation that the Boer republics might stand on land of immense mineral wealth. Diamonds had been discovered in Griqua territory just north of the Orange River on the western edge of the Free State, arousing the interest of Britain and other countries; mostly British settlers, referred to by the Boers as uitlanders ("out-landers"), were flooding into the region. Britain began to pursue federation (at that time often referred to as "confederation") of the Boer republics with the Cape and Natal and in 1873, over Boer objections, annexed the area surrounding the huge diamond mine at Kimberley, dubbing it Griqualand West. (Note: This followed the annexation of Basutoland to the Cape Colony in 1868.)

Some Doppers preferred to embark on another trek, north-west across the Kalahari Desert towards Angola, rather than live under Burgers. This became the Dorsland Trek of 1874. The emigrants asked Kruger to lead the way, but he refused to take part. In September 1874, following a long delay calling the volksraad due to sickness, Burgers proposed a railway to Delagoa Bay and said he would go to Europe to raise the necessary funds. By the time he left in February 1875 opposition pressure had brought about an amendment to bring religious instruction back into school hours, and Kruger had been restored to the executive council.

In 1876 hostilities broke out with the Bapedi people under Sekhukhune. Burgers had told the Acting President Piet Joubert not to fight a war in his absence, so the Transvaal government did little to combat the Bapedi raids. On his return Burgers resolved to send a commando against Sekhukhune; he called on Kruger to lead the column, but much to his surprise the erstwhile commandant-general refused. Burgers unsuccessfully asked Joubert to head the commando, then approached Kruger twice more, but to no avail. Kruger was convinced that God would cause any military expedition organised by Burgers to fail—particularly if the President rode with the commando, which he was determined to do. "I cannot lead the commando if you come", Kruger said, "for, with your merry evenings in laager and your Sunday dances, the enemy will even shoot me behind the wall; for God's blessing will not rest on your expedition." Burgers, who had no military experience, led the commando himself after several other prospective generals rebuffed him. After being routed by Sekhukhune, he hired a group of "volunteers" under the German Conrad von Schlickmann to defend the country, paying for this by levying a special tax. The war ended, but Burgers became extremely unpopular among his electorate.

With Burgers due to stand for re-election the following year, Kruger became a popular alternative candidate, but he resolved to stand by the President after Burgers privately assured him that he would do his utmost to defend the South African Republic's independence. The towns of the Transvaal were becoming increasingly British in character as immigration and trade gathered pace, and the idea of annexation was gaining support both locally and in the British government. In late 1876 Lord Carnarvon, Colonial Secretary under Benjamin Disraeli, gave Sir Theophilus Shepstone of Natal a special commission to confer with the South African Republic's government and, if he saw fit, annex the country.

=== British annexation; first and second deputations ===
Shepstone arrived in Pretoria in January 1877. He outlined criticisms expressed by Carnarvon regarding the Transvaal government and expressed support for federation. After a joint commission of inquiry on the British grievances—Kruger and the State Attorney E J P Jorissen refuted most of Carnarvon's allegations, one of which was that Pretoria tolerated slavery—Shepstone stayed in the capital, openly telling Burgers he had come to the Transvaal to annex it. Hoping to stop the annexation by reforming the government, Burgers introduced scores of bills and revisions to a bewildered volksraad, which opposed them all but then passed them, heightening the general mood of discord and confusion. One of these reforms appointed Kruger to the new post of vice-president.

The impression of Kruger garnered by the British envoys in Pretoria during early 1877 was one of an unspeakably vulgar, bigoted backveld peasant. Regarding his austere, weather-beaten face, greying hair and simple Dopper dress of a short-cut black jacket, baggy trousers and a black top hat, they considered him extremely ugly. Furthermore, they found his personal habits, such as copious spitting, revolting. Shepstone's legal adviser William Morcom was one of the first British officials to write about Kruger: calling him "gigantically horrible", he recounted a public luncheon at which Kruger dined with a dirty pipe protruding from his pocket and such greasy hair that he spent part of the meal combing it. According to Martin Meredith, Kruger's unsightliness was mentioned in British reports "so often that it became shorthand for his whole personality, and indeed, his objectives". They did not consider him a major threat to British ambitions.

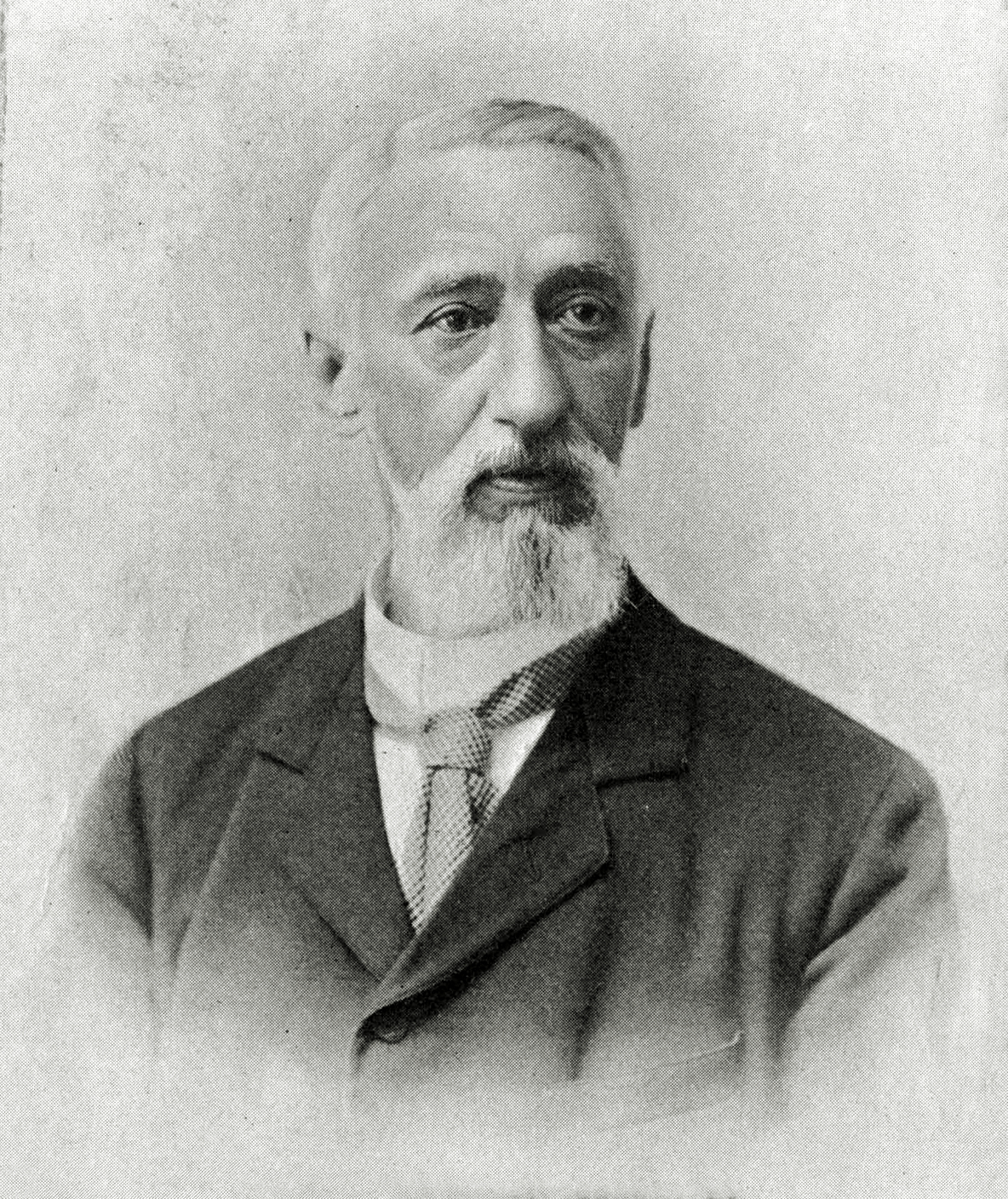
E. J. P. Jorissen, Kruger's colleague in the first deputation to London, pictured in 1897

Shepstone had the Transvaal's annexation as a British territory formally announced in Pretoria on 11 April 1877. Burgers resigned and returned to the Cape to live in retirement—his last act as president was to announce the government's decision to send a deputation, headed by Kruger and Jorissen, to London to make an official protest. He exhorted the burghers not to attempt any kind of resistance to the British until these diplomats returned. Jorissen, one of the Dutch officials recently imported by Burgers, was included at Kruger's request because of his wide knowledge of European languages (Kruger was not confident in his English); a second Dutchman, Willem Eduard Bok, accompanied them as secretary. They left in May 1877, travelling first to Bloemfontein to confer with the Free State government, then on to Kimberley and Worcester, where the 51-year-old Kruger boarded a train for the first time in his life. In Cape Town, where his German ancestor had landed 164 years before, he had his first sight of the sea.

During the voyage to England Kruger encountered a 19-year-old law student from the Orange Free State named Martinus Theunis Steyn. Jorissen and Bok marvelled at Kruger, in their eyes more suited to the 17th century than his own time. One night, when Kruger heard the two Dutchmen discussing celestial bodies and the structure of the universe, he interjected that if their conversation was accurate and the Earth was not flat, he might as well throw his Bible overboard. At the Colonial Office in Whitehall, Carnarvon and Kruger's own colleagues were astonished when, speaking through interpreters, he rose to what Meintjes calls "remarkable heights of oratory", averring that the annexation breached the Sand River Convention and went against the popular will in the Transvaal. His arguments were undermined by reports to the contrary from Shepstone and other British officials, and by a widely publicised letter from a Potchefstroom vicar claiming that Kruger only represented the will of "a handful of irreconcilables". Carnarvon dismissed Kruger's idea of a general plebiscite and concluded that British rule would remain.

Kruger did not meet Queen Victoria, though such an audience is described in numerous anecdotes, depicted in films and sometimes reported as fact. (Note: The statement in Manfred Nathan's Paul Kruger: His Life and Times (1941) that the deputation received a royal audience at Windsor Castle is specifically refuted in the first volume of D W Krüger's Paul Kruger (1961). Meintjes agrees with D W Krüger that no audience occurred.) Between August and October he visited the Netherlands and Germany, where he aroused little general public interest, but made a potent impact in the Reformed congregations he visited. After a brief sojourn back in England he returned to South Africa and arrived at Boekenhoutfontein shortly before Christmas 1877. He found a national awakening occurring. "Paradoxically", John Laband writes, "British occupation seemed to be fomenting a sense of national consciousness in the Transvaal which years of fractious independence had failed to elicit." When Kruger visited Pretoria in January 1878 he was greeted by a procession that took him to a mass gathering in Church Square. Attempting to stir up the crowd, Kruger said that since Carnarvon had told him the annexation would not be revoked he could not see what more they could do. The gambit worked; burghers began shouting that they would sooner die fighting for their country than submit to the British.

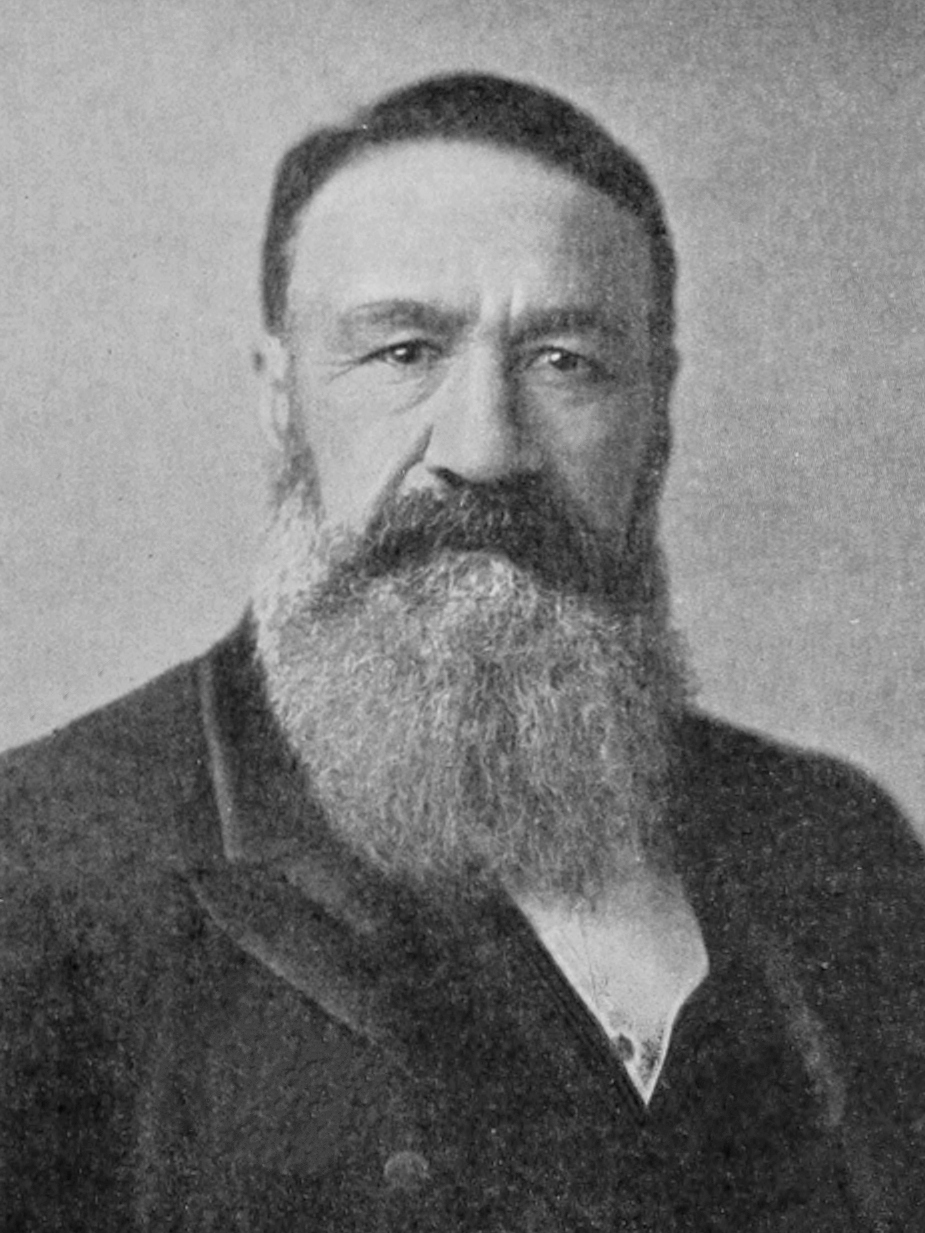
Piet Joubert, Kruger's associate in the second deputation

According to Meintjes, Kruger was still not particularly anti-British; he thought the British had made a mistake and would rectify the situation if this could be proven to them. After conducting a poll through the former republican infrastructure—587 signed in favour of the annexation, 6,591 against—he organised a second deputation to London, made up of himself and Joubert with Bok again serving as secretary. The envoys met the British High Commissioner in Cape Town, Sir Bartle Frere, and arrived in London on 29 June 1878 to find a censorious letter from Shepstone waiting for them, along with a communication that since Kruger was agitating against the government he had been dismissed from the executive council. (Note: Kruger had remained in the executive under the British and accepted a salary, even successfully requesting a raise, though he did not take the new oath of allegiance. This was in stark contrast to Joubert (outside the government at the time of the annexation), who refused to have anything to do with the British authorities. Some burghers denounced Kruger's actions as hypocritical.)

Carnarvon had been succeeded as colonial secretary by Sir Michael Hicks Beach, who received the deputation coldly. After Bok gave a lengthy opening declaration, Hicks Beach muttered: "Have you ever heard of an instance where the British Lion has ever given up anything on which he had set his paw?" Kruger retorted: "Yes. The Orange Free State." The deputation remained in London for some weeks thereafter, communicating by correspondence with Hicks Beach, who eventually reaffirmed Carnarvon's decision that the annexation would not be revoked. The deputation attempted to rally support for their cause, as the first mission had done, but with the Eastern Question dominating the political scene few were interested. One English sympathiser gave Kruger a gold ring, bearing the inscription: "Take courage, your cause is just and must triumph in the end." Kruger was touched and wore it for the rest of his life.

Like its predecessor, the second deputation went on from England to continental Europe, visiting the Netherlands, France and Germany. In Paris, where the 1878 Exposition Universelle was in progress, Kruger saw a hot air balloon for the first time and readily took part in an ascent to view the city from above. "High up in mid-air", he recalled, "I jestingly asked the aeronaut, as we had gone so far, to take me all the way home." The pilot asked who Kruger was and, on their descent, gave him a medal "to remind me of my journey through the air". The deputation composed a long reply to Hicks Beach, which was published as an open letter in the British press soon before they sailed for home on 24 October 1878. Unless the annexation were revoked, the letter stated, the Transvaal Boers would not co-operate regarding federation.

=== Drive for independence ===
Kruger and Joubert returned home to find the British and the Zulus were close to war. Shepstone had supported the Zulus in a border dispute with the South African Republic, but then, after annexing the Transvaal, changed his mind and endorsed the Boer claim. Meeting Sir Bartle Frere and Lord Chelmsford at Pietermaritzburg on 28 November 1878, Kruger happily gave tactical guidance for the British campaign—he advised the use of Boer tactics, making laagers at every stop and constantly scouting ahead—but refused Frere's request that he accompany one of the British columns, saying he would only help if assurances were made regarding the Transvaal. (Note: Kruger also refused a subsequent request from Shepstone to raise a Boer commando to help the British in Zululand.) Chelmsford thought the campaign would be a "promenade" and did not take Kruger's advice. Soon after he entered Zululand in January 1879, starting the Anglo-Zulu War, his unlaagered central column was surprised by Cetshwayo's Zulus at Isandlwana and almost totally destroyed.

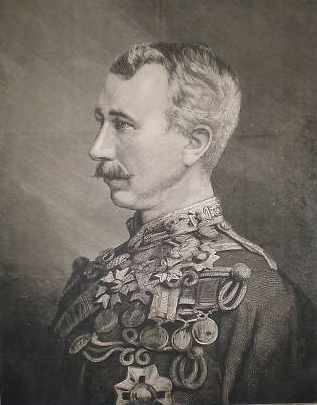
Sir Garnet Wolseley, who headed the British Transvaal administration from 1879 to 1880

The war in Zululand effectively ended on 4 July 1879 with Chelmsford's decisive victory at the Zulu capital Ulundi. Around the same time the British appointed a new Governor and High Commissioner for the Transvaal and Natal, Sir Garnet Wolseley, who introduced a new Transvaal constitution giving the Boers a limited degree of self-government. Wolseley blunted the Zulu military threat by splitting the kingdom into 13 chiefdoms, and crushed Sekhukhune and the Bapedi during late 1879. He had little success in winning the Boers over to the idea of federation; his defeat of the Zulus and the Bapedi had the opposite effect, as with these two long-standing threats to security removed the Transvaalers could focus all their efforts against the British. Most Boers refused to co-operate with Wolseley's new order; Kruger declined a seat in the new executive council.

At Wonderfontein on 15 December 1879, 6,000 burghers, many of them bearing the republic's vierkleur ("four-colour") flag, voted to pursue a restored, independent republic. Pretorius and Bok were imprisoned on charges of high treason when they took this news to Wolseley and Sir Owen Lanyon (who had replaced Shepstone), prompting many burghers to consider rising up there and then—Kruger persuaded them not to, saying this was premature. Pretorius and Bok were swiftly released after Jorissen telegraphed the British Liberal politician William Ewart Gladstone, who had met Kruger's first deputation in London and had since condemned the annexation as unjust during his Midlothian campaign.

In early 1880 Hicks Beach forwarded a scheme for South African federation to the Cape Parliament. Kruger travelled to the Cape to agitate against the proposals alongside Joubert and Jorissen; by the time they arrived the Liberals had won an election victory in Britain and Gladstone was prime minister. In Cape Town, Paarl and elsewhere Kruger lobbied vigorously against the annexation and won much sympathy. (Note: He spoke of the kind of self-government the British were offering in derisory terms: "They say to you, 'First put your head quietly in the noose, so that I can hang you up: then you may kick your legs about as much as you please!' That is what they call self-government.") Davenport suggests that this contributed to the federation plan's withdrawal, which in turn weakened the British resolve to keep the Transvaal. Kruger and Joubert wrote to Gladstone asking him to restore the South African Republic's independence, but to their astonishment the prime minister replied in June 1880 that he feared withdrawing from the Transvaal might lead to chaos across South Africa. Kruger concluded that they had done all they could to try to regain independence peacefully, and over the following months the Transvaal burghers prepared for rebellion. Wolseley was replaced as governor and high commissioner by Sir George Pomeroy Colley.

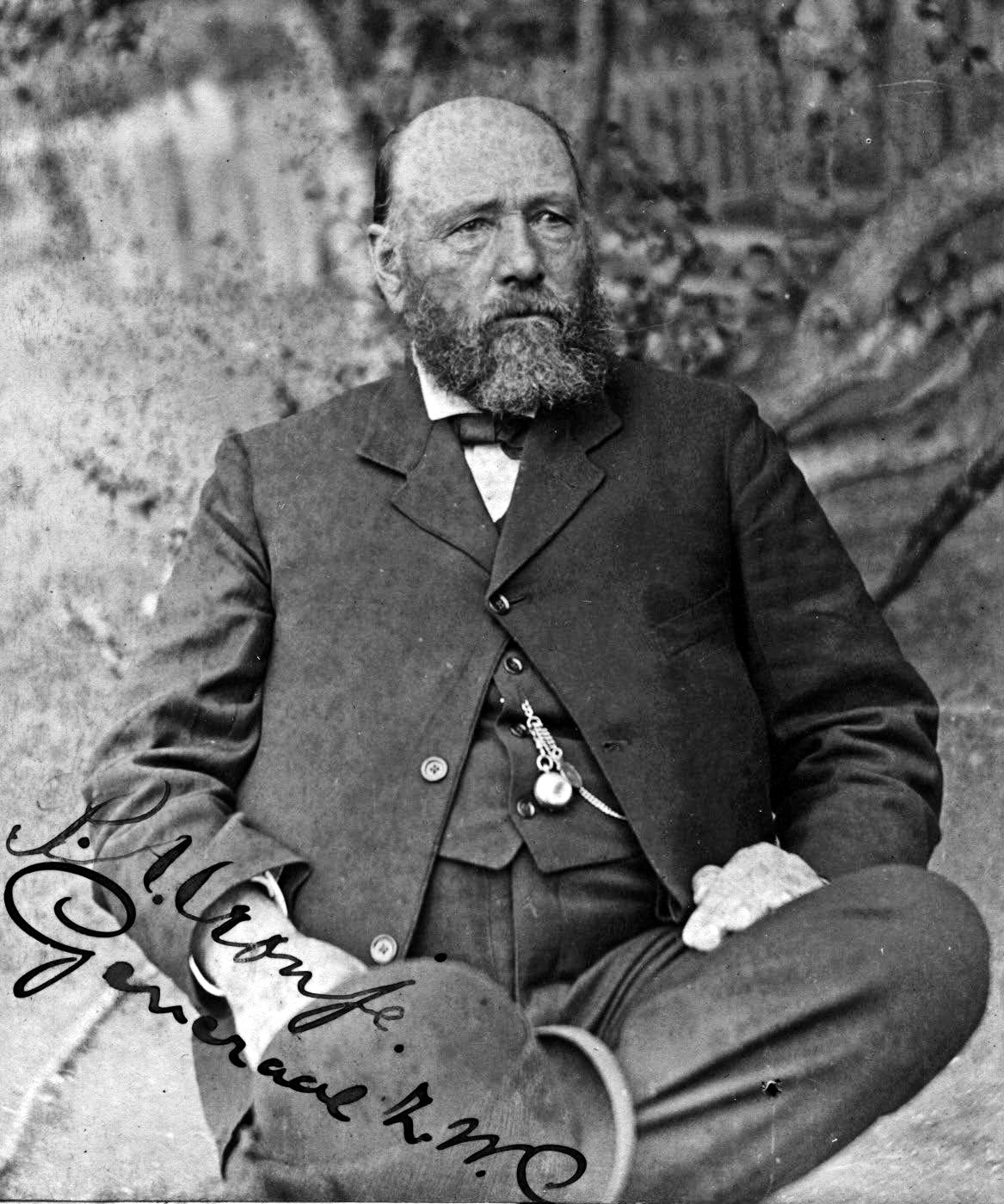
Piet Cronjé, pictured later in life

In the last months of 1880, Lanyon began to pursue tax payments from burghers who were in arrears. Piet Cronjé, a farmer in the Potchefstroom district, gave his local landdrost a written statement that the burghers would pay taxes to their "legal government"—that of the South African Republic—but not to the British "usurper" administration. Kruger and Cronjé knew each other; the writer Johan Frederik van Oordt, who was acquainted with them both, suggested that Kruger may have had a hand in this and what followed. In November, when the British authorities in Potchefstroom were about to auction off a burgher's wagon that had been seized amid a tax dispute, Cronjé and a group of armed Boers intervened, overcame the presiding officers and reclaimed the wagon. On hearing of this from Cronjé, Kruger told Joubert: "I can no longer restrain the people, and the English government is entirely responsible for the present state of things."

Starting on 8 December 1880 at Paardekraal, a farm to the south-west of Pretoria, 10,000 Boers congregated—the largest recorded meeting of white people in South Africa up to that time. "I stand here before you", Kruger declared, "called by the people. In the voice of the people I have heard the voice of God, the King of Nations, and I obey!" He announced the fulfilment of the decision taken at Wonderfontein the previous year to restore the South African Republic government and volksraad, which as the vice-president of the last independent administration he considered his responsibility. To help him in this he turned to Jorissen and Bok, who respectively became State Attorney and State Secretary, and Pretorius and Joubert, who the reconstituted volksraad elected to an executive triumvirate along with Kruger. The assembly approved a proclamation announcing the restoration of the South African Republic.

== Triumvirate ==
=== Transvaal rebellion: the First Boer War ===
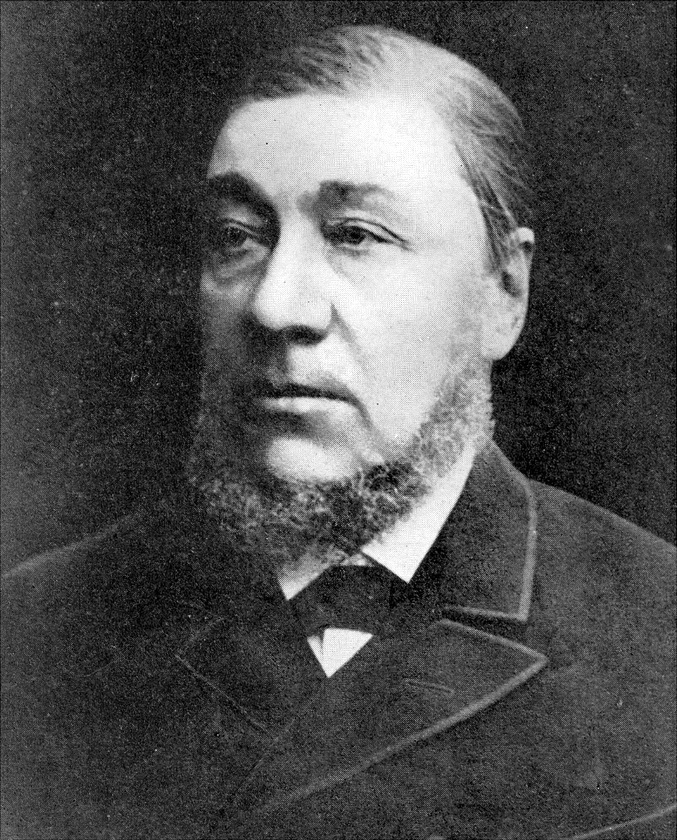
Kruger, photographed c. 1880

At Kruger's suggestion Joubert was elected Commandant-General of the restored republic, though he had little military experience and protested he was not suited to the position. The provisional government set up a temporary capital at Heidelberg, a strategically placed town on the main road from Natal, and sent a copy of the proclamation to Lanyon along with a written demand that he surrender the government offices in Pretoria. Lanyon refused and mobilised the British garrison.

Kruger took part in the First Boer War in a civilian capacity only, playing a diplomatic and political role with the aid of Jorissen and Bok. The first major clash, a successful Boer ambush, took place on 20 December 1880 at Bronkhorstspruit. By the turn of the year the Transvaalers had all six British garrison outposts, including that in Pretoria, under siege. Colley assembled a field force in Natal, summoned reinforcements from India, and advanced towards the Transvaal. Joubert moved about 2,000 Boers south to the Drakensberg and repulsed Colley at Laing's Nek on 28 January 1881. After Colley retreated to Schuinshoogte, near Ingogo, he was attacked by Joubert's second-in-command Nicolaas Smit on 8 February and again defeated.

Understanding that they could not hold out against the might of the British Empire indefinitely, Kruger hoped for a solution at the earliest opportunity. The triumvirate wrote to Colley on 12 February that they were prepared to submit to a royal commission. Colley liaised by telegraph with Gladstone's Colonial Secretary Lord Kimberley, then wrote to Kruger on 21 February that if the Boers stopped fighting he would cease hostilities and send commissioners for talks. Kruger received this letter on 28 February and readily accepted, but by now it was too late. Colley had been killed at the Battle of Majuba Hill the day before, another decisive victory for the Boers under Smit. This progressive humiliation of the Imperial forces in South Africa by a ragtag collection of farmers, to paraphrase Meintjes and the historian Ian Castle, stunned the Western world.

Colley's death horrified Kruger, who feared it might jeopardise the peace process. His reply to Colley's letter was delivered to his successor Sir Evelyn Wood on 7 March 1881, a day after Wood and Joubert had agreed to an eight-day truce. Kruger was outraged to learn of this armistice, which in his view only gave the British opportunity to strengthen their forces—he expected a British attempt to avenge Majuba, which indeed Wood and others wanted—but Gladstone wanted peace, and Wood was instructed to proceed with talks. Negotiations began on 16 March. The British offered amnesty for the Boer leaders, retrocession of the Transvaal under British suzerainty, a British resident in Pretoria and British control over foreign affairs. Kruger pressed on how the British intended to withdraw and what exactly "suzerainty" meant. Brand arrived to mediate on 20 March and the following day agreement was reached; the British committed to formally restore the republic within six months. (Note: Kruger was briefly incensed when Wood held that no written agreement to this effect was necessary, the minutes being in his view sufficient, but Wood ultimately relented and put his signature to the terms along with the Boer triumvirate.) The final treaty was concluded on 23 March 1881.

=== Pretoria Convention ===
Kruger presented the treaty to the volksraad on the triumvirate's behalf at Heidelberg on 15 April 1881. "With a feeling of gratitude to the God of our fathers", he said, "who has been near us in battle and danger, it is to me an unspeakable privilege to lay before you the treaty ... I consider it my duty plainly to declare before you and the whole world, that our respect for Her Majesty the Queen of England, for the government of Her Majesty, and for the English Nation, has never been greater than at this time, when we are enabled to show you a proof of England's noble and magnanimous love for right and justice." This statement was to be ignored by many writers, but Manfred Nathan, one of Kruger's biographers, stresses it as one of his "most notable utterances". Kruger reaffirmed his faith in the royal commission of Wood, Sir Hercules Robinson and the Cape's Chief Justice Sir Henry de Villiers, who convened for the first time in Natal on 30 April, Brand with them as an adviser. The commissioners held numerous sessions in Pretoria over the following months with little input from Kruger, who was bedridden with pneumonia.

Kruger was largely happy with the terms under which the republic would regain its sovereignty, but two points offended him. The first of these was that the British would recognise them as the "Transvaal Republic" and not the South African Republic; the second was that it was still not clear to him what British "suzerainty" was. The commission, in which De Villiers emerged as the dominant figure, defined it primarily as British purview over the Transvaal's external affairs. The final Pretoria Convention was signed on 3 August 1881 by Joubert, Pretorius and the members of the royal commission. Kruger was absent due to his illness, but he did attend the official retrocession five days later in Church Square. Kruger felt well enough to give only a short speech, after which Pretorius addressed the crowd and the vierkleur was raised.

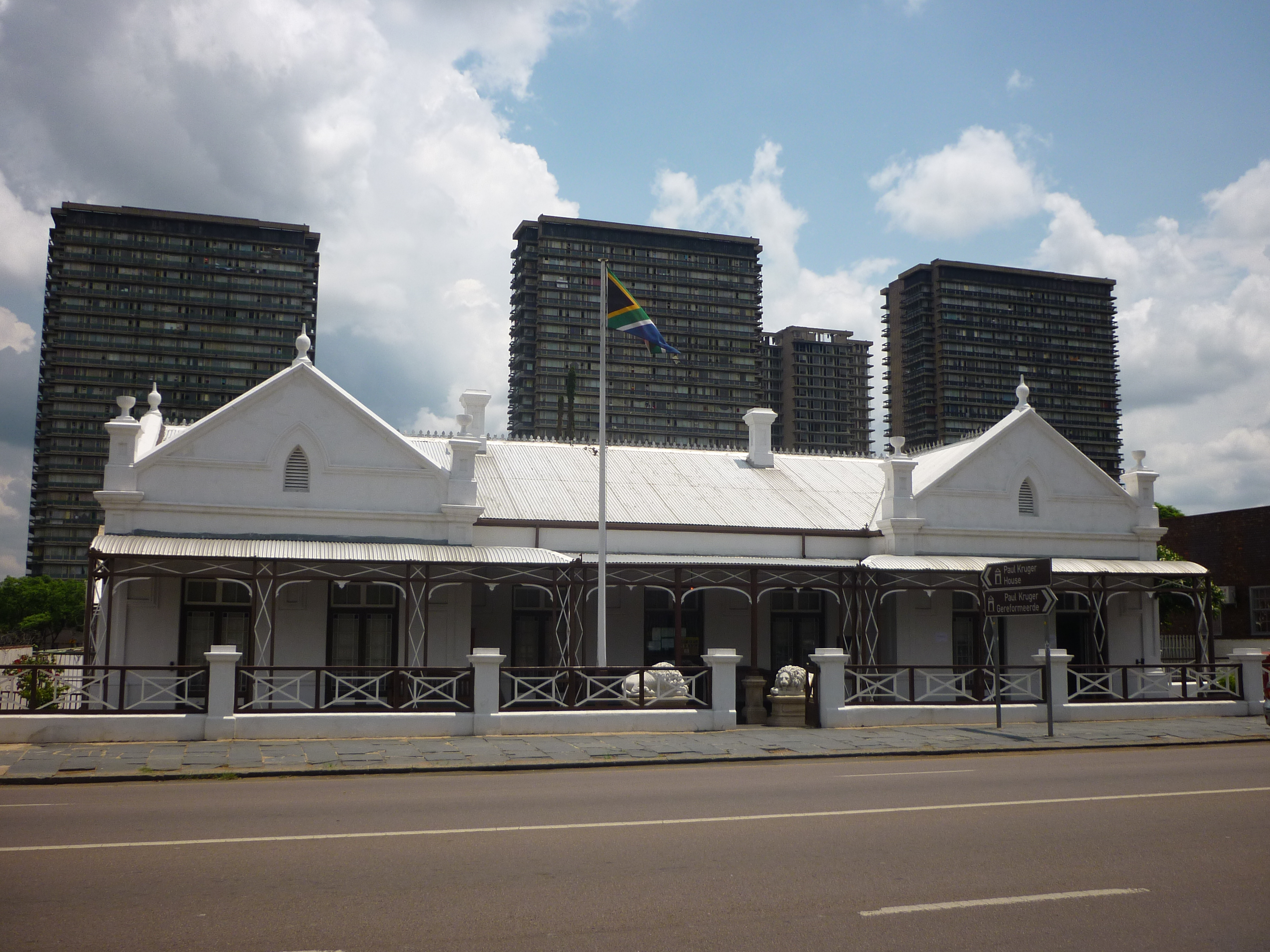
Kruger House, the family home in Pretoria (2010 photograph)

By now aged nearly 56, Kruger resolved that he could no longer travel constantly between Boekenhoutfontein and the capital, and in August 1881 he and Gezina moved to Church Street, Pretoria, from where he could easily walk to the government offices on Church Square. Also around this time he shaved off his moustache and most of his facial hair, leaving the chinstrap beard he kept thereafter. His and Gezina's permanent home on Church Street, what is now called Kruger House, would be completed in 1884.

A direct consequence of the end of British rule was an economic slump; the Transvaal government almost immediately found itself again on the verge of bankruptcy. The triumvirate spent two months discussing the terms of the Pretoria Convention with the new volksraad—approve it or go back to Laing's Nek, said Kruger—before it was finally ratified on 25 October 1881. During this time Kruger introduced tax reforms, announced the triumvirate's decision to grant industrial monopolies to raise money and appointed the Reverend S J du Toit to be Superintendent of Education. To counteract the influx of uitlanders, the residency qualification to vote was raised from a year to five years. In July 1882 the volksraad decided to elect a new president the following year; Joubert and Kruger emerged as candidates. Kruger campaigned on the idea of an administration in which "God's Word would be my rule of conduct"—as premier he would prioritise agriculture, industry and education, revive Burgers's Delagoa Bay railway scheme, introduce an immigration policy that would "prevent the Boer nationality from being stifled", and pursue a cordial stance towards Britain and "obedient native races in their appointed districts". He defeated Joubert by 3,431 votes to 1,171, and was inaugurated as president on 9 May 1883.

== President ==
=== Third deputation; London Convention ===
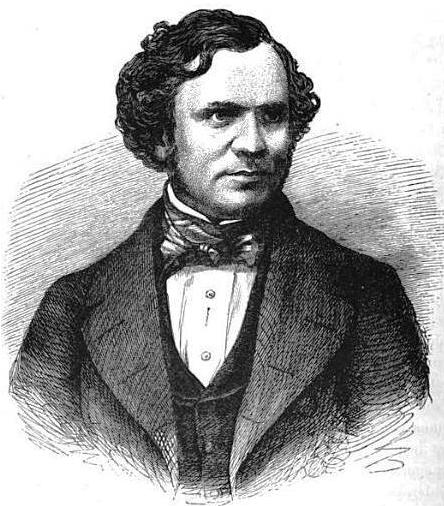
Lord Derby, with whom the third deputation concluded the London Convention

Kruger became president soon after the discovery of gold near what was to become Barberton, which prompted a fresh influx of uitlander diggers. "This gold is still going to soak our country in blood", said Joubert—a prediction he would repeat many times over the coming years. Joubert remained commandant-general under Kruger and also became vice-president. A convoluted situation developed on the Transvaal's western frontier, where burghers had crossed the border defined in the Pretoria Convention and formed two new Boer republics, Stellaland and Goshen, on former Tswana territory in 1882. These states were tiny but they occupied land of potentially huge importance—the main road from the Cape to Matabeleland and the African interior.

Kruger and the volksraad resolved to send yet another deputation to London to renegotiate the Pretoria Convention and settle the western border issue. The third deputation, comprising Kruger, Smit and Du Toit with Ewald Esselen as secretary, left the Transvaal in August 1883 and sailed from Cape Town two months later. Kruger spent part of the voyage to Britain studying the English language with a Bible printed in Dutch and English side by side. Talks with the new Colonial Secretary Lord Derby and Robinson progressed smoothly—apart from an incident when Kruger, thinking himself insulted, nearly punched Robinson—and on 27 February 1884 the London Convention, superseding that of Pretoria, was concluded. Britain ended its suzerainty, reduced the Transvaal's national debt and once again recognised the country as the South African Republic. The western border question remained unresolved, but Kruger still considered the convention a triumph. (Note: While in London the deputation ran short of cash and had trouble paying their accommodation costs. Their acquaintance Baron Grant assisted them in exchange for a public statement from Kruger assuring rights and protection to British settlers in the Transvaal. This was later presented by some of Kruger's critics as evidence that the uitlanders had entered the Transvaal at his own invitation.)

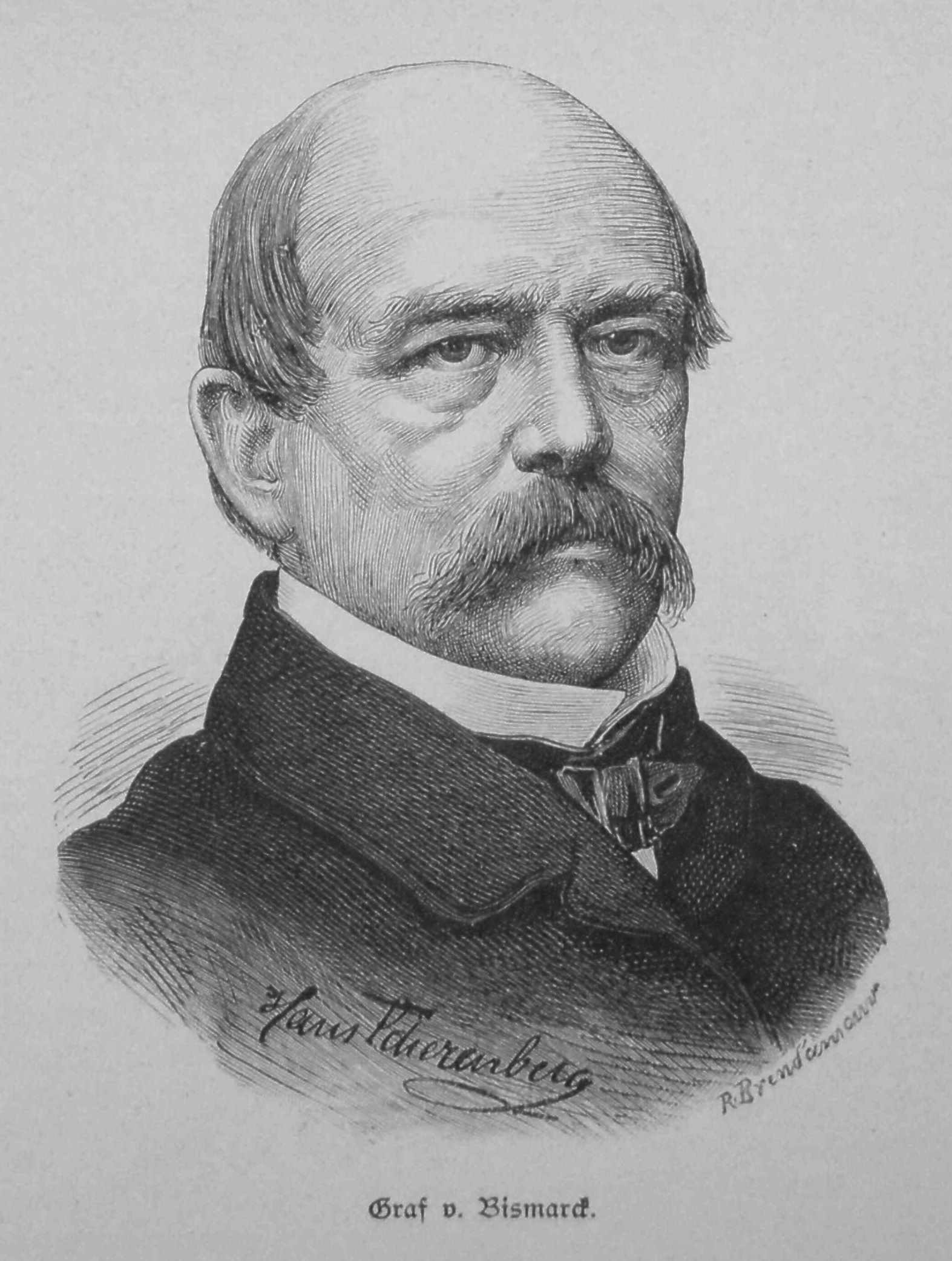
Bismarck, one of the many European leaders Kruger met in 1884

The deputation went on from London to mainland Europe, where according to Meintjes their reception "was beyond all expectations ... one banquet followed the other, the stand of a handful of Boers against the British Empire having caused a sensation". During a grand tour Kruger met William III of the Netherlands and his son the Prince of Orange, Leopold II of Belgium, President Jules Grévy of France, Alfonso XII of Spain, Luís I of Portugal, and in Germany Kaiser Wilhelm I and his Chancellor Otto von Bismarck. His public appearances were attended by tens of thousands. The deputation discussed the bilateral aspects of the proposed Delagoa Bay railway with the Portuguese, and in the Netherlands laid the groundwork for the Netherlands-South African Railway Company, which would build and operate it. Kruger now held that Burgers had been "far ahead of his time"—while reviving his predecessor's railway scheme, he also brought back the policy of importing officials from the Netherlands, in his view a means to strengthen the Boer identity and keep the Transvaal "Dutch". Willem Johannes Leyds, a 24-year-old Dutchman, returned to South Africa with the deputation as the republic's new State Attorney.

By late 1884 the Scramble for Africa was well underway. Competition on the western frontier rose after Germany annexed South-West Africa; at the behest of the mining magnate and Cape MP Cecil Rhodes, Britain proclaimed a protectorate over Bechuanaland, including the Stellaland–Goshen corridor. While Joubert was in negotiations with Rhodes, Du Toit had Kruger proclaim Transvaal protection over the corridor on 18 September 1884. Joubert was outraged, as was Kruger when on 3 October Du Toit unilaterally hoisted the vierkleur in Goshen. Realising the implications of this—it clearly violated the London Convention—Kruger had the flag stricken immediately and retracted his proclamation of 18 September. Meeting Rhodes personally in late January 1885, Kruger insisted the "flag incident" had taken place without his consent and conceded the corridor to the British.

=== Gold rush; burghers and uitlanders ===
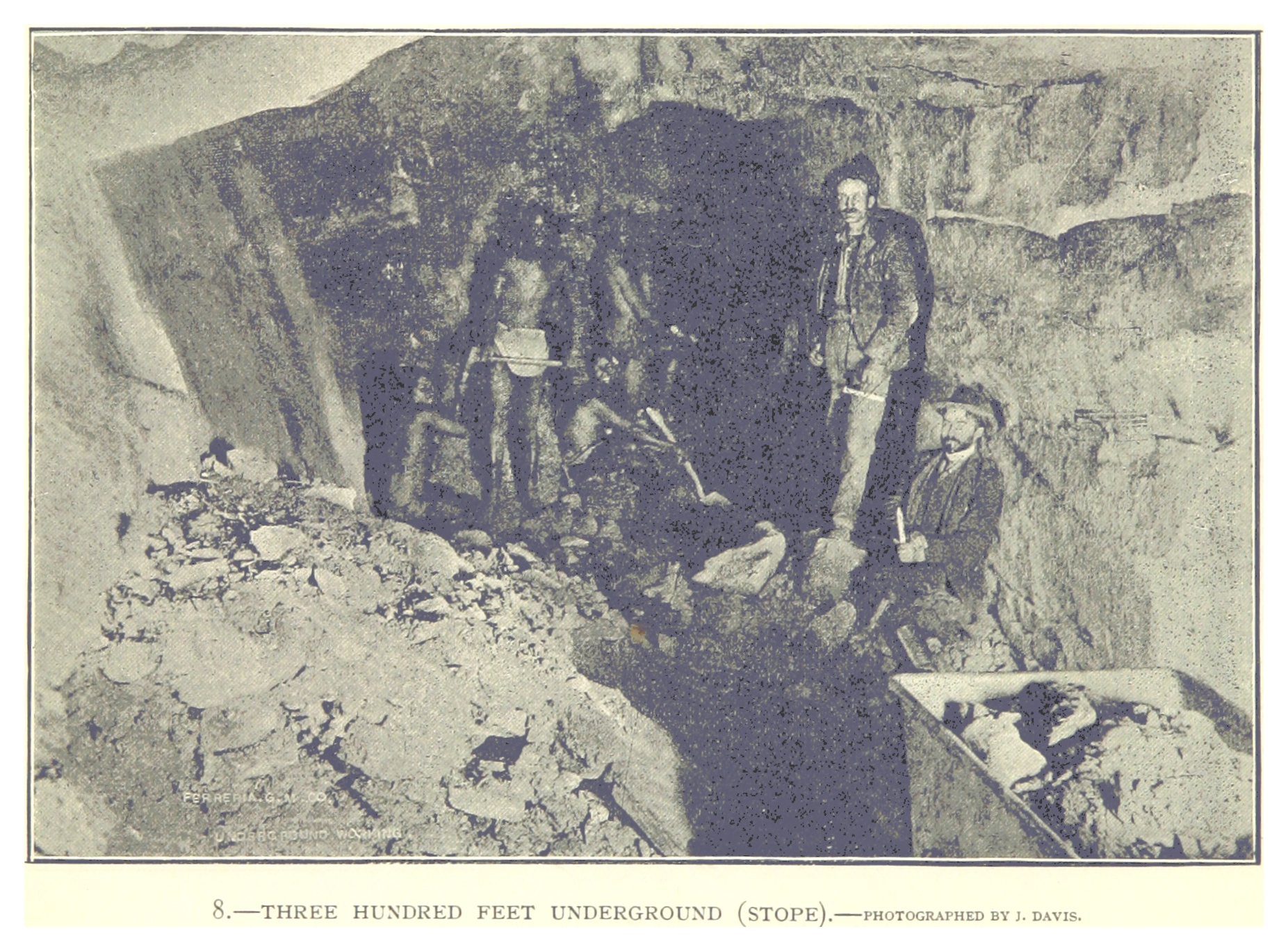
Gold mining at Johannesburg in 1893

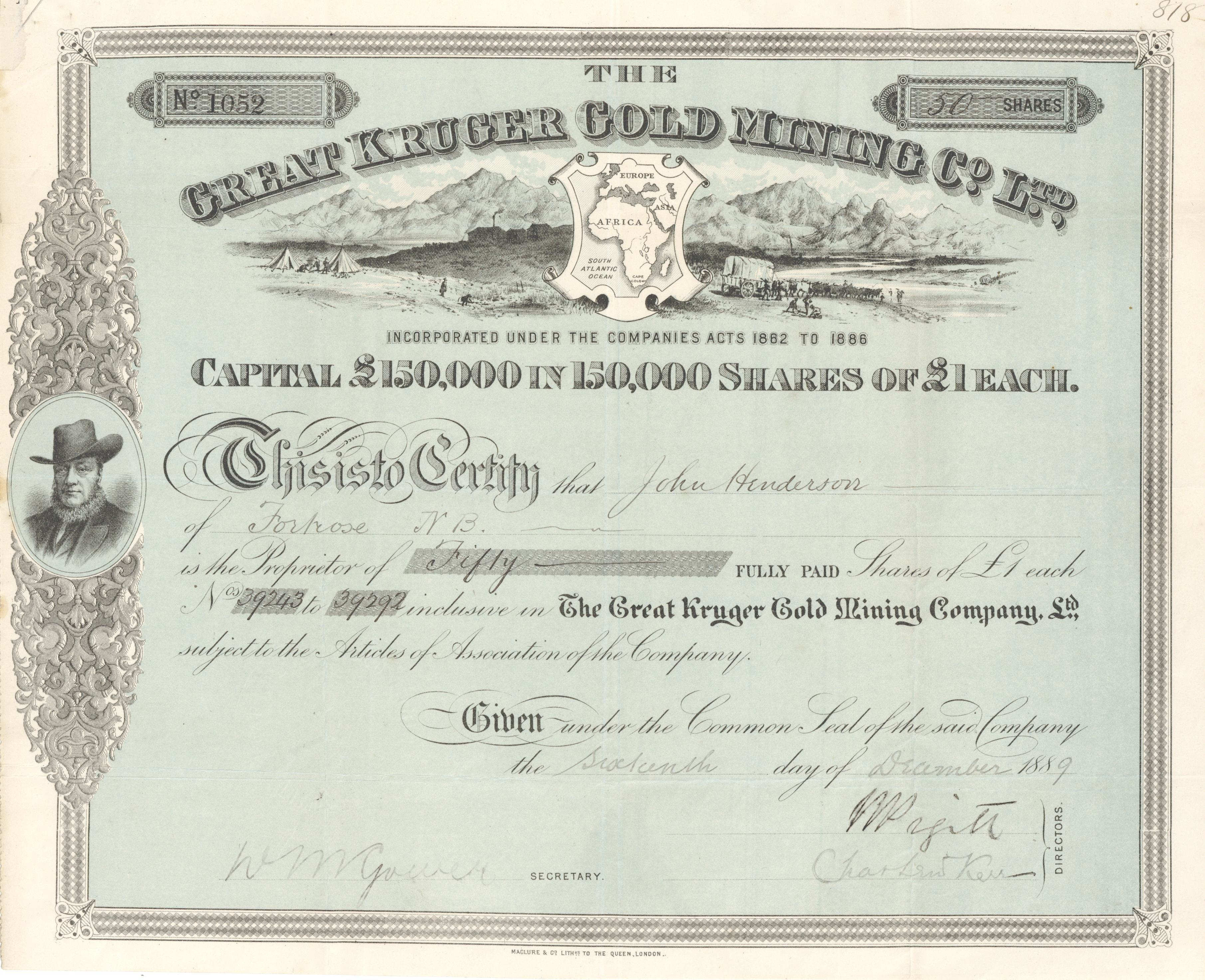
Share of the Great Kruger Gold Mining Company Ltd, issued 16 December 1889

In July 1886 an Australian prospector reported to the Transvaal government his discovery of an unprecedented gold reef between Pretoria and Heidelberg. The South African Republic's formal proclamation of this two months later prompted the Witwatersrand Gold Rush and the founding of Johannesburg, which within a few years was the largest city in southern Africa, populated almost entirely by uitlanders. The economic landscape of the region was transformed overnight—the South African Republic went from the verge of bankruptcy in 1886 to a fiscal output equal to the Cape Colony's the following year. The British became anxious to link Johannesburg to the Cape and Natal by rail, but Kruger thought this might have undesirable geopolitical and economic implications if done prematurely and gave the Delagoa Bay line first priority.

The President was by this time widely nicknamed Oom Paul ("Uncle Paul"), both among the Boers and the uitlanders, who variously used it out of affection or contempt. He was perceived by some as a despot after he compromised the independence of the republic's judiciary to help his friend Alois Hugo Nellmapius, who had been found guilty of embezzlement—Kruger rejected the court's judgement and granted Nellmapius a full pardon, an act Nathan calls "completely indefensible". Kruger defeated Joubert again in the 1888 election, by 4,483 votes to 834, and was sworn in for a second time in May. Nicolaas Smit was elected vice-president, and Leyds was promoted to state secretary.

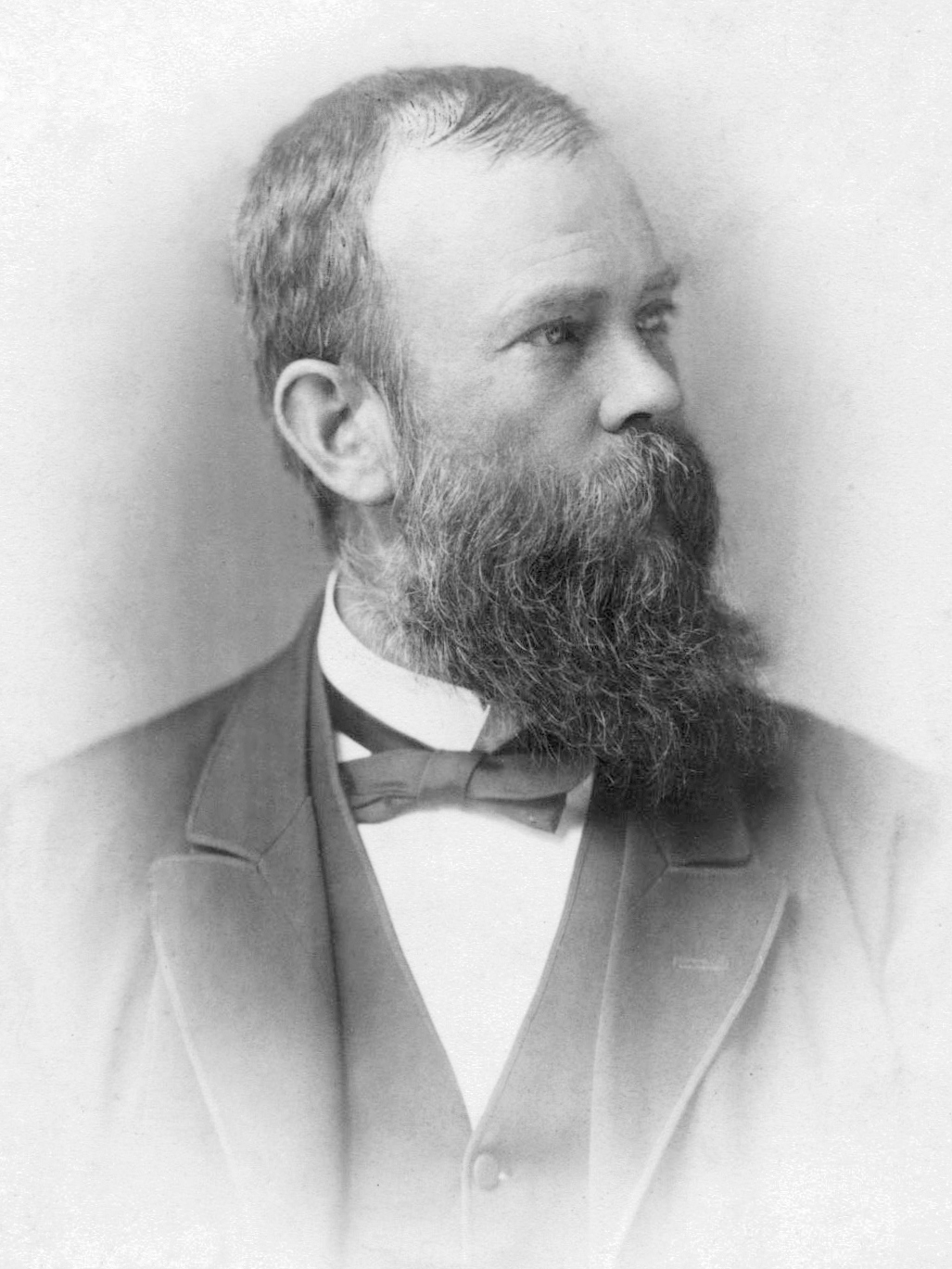
President Francis William Reitz of the Orange Free State

Much of Kruger's efforts over the next year were dedicated to attempts to acquire a sea outlet for the South African Republic. In July Pieter Grobler, who had just negotiated a treaty with King Lobengula of Matabeleland, was killed by Ngwato warriors on his way home; Kruger alleged that this was the work of "Cecil Rhodes and his clique". Kruger despised Rhodes, considering him corrupt and immoral—in his memoirs he called him "capital incarnate" and "the curse of South Africa". According to the editor of Kruger's memoirs, Rhodes attempted to win him as an ally by suggesting "we simply take" Delagoa Bay from Portugal; Kruger was appalled. Failing to make headway in talks with the Portuguese, Kruger switched his attention to Kosi Bay, next to Swaziland, in late 1888.

In early 1889 Kruger and the new Orange Free State President Francis William Reitz enacted a common-defence pact and a customs treaty waiving most import duties. The same year the volksraad passed constitutional revisions to remove the Nederduits Hervormde Kerk's official status, open the legislature to members of other denominations and make all churches "sovereign in their own spheres". Kruger proposed to end the lack of higher education in the Boer republics by forming a university in Pretoria; enthusiastic support emerged for this but the Free University of Amsterdam expressed strong opposition, not wishing to lose the Afrikaner element of its student body. No university was built. (Note: Higher education came to the Transvaal only following Kruger's death; the University of Pretoria was established in 1908.)

Kruger was obsessed with the South African Republic's independence, the retention of which he perceived as under threat if the Transvaal became too British in character. The uitlanders created an acute predicament in his mind. Taxation on their mining provided almost all of the republic's revenues, but they had very limited civic representation and almost no say in the running of the country. Though the English language was dominant in the mining areas, only Dutch remained official. Kruger expressed great satisfaction at the new arrivals' industry and respect for the state's laws, but surmised that giving them full burgher rights might cause the Boers to be swamped by sheer weight in numbers, with the probable result of absorption into the British sphere. Agonising over how he "could meet the wishes of the new population for representation, without injuring the republic or prejudicing the interests of the older burghers", he thought he had solved the problem in 1889 when he tabled a "second volksraad" in which the uitlanders would have certain matters devolved to them. Most deemed this inadequate, and even Kruger's own supporters were unenthusiastic.

Rhodes and other British figures often contended that there were more uitlanders in the Transvaal than Boers. Kruger's administration recorded twice as many Transvaalers as uitlanders, but acknowledged that there were more uitlanders than enfranchised burghers. (Note: Figures released by the Transvaal government in 1896 counted 150,308 Boers born in the South African Republic (including women and children), and 75,720 (mostly adult male) uitlanders, of whom 41,275 were British subjects. Estimates of the ratio between uitlanders and enfranchised burghers were often exaggerated and ranged from near-parity to ten-to-one. Kruger's government made policy on the assumption that there were roughly 30,000 burghers and 60,000 adult male uitlanders.) According to the British Liberal politician James Bryce, most uitlanders saw the country as "virtually English" and perceived "something unreasonable or even grotesque in the control of a small body of persons whom they deemed in every way their inferiors". On 4 March 1890, when Kruger visited Johannesburg, men sang British patriotic songs, tore down and trampled on the vierkleur at the city landdrost's office, and rioted outside the house where the President was staying. One of the agitators accused him of treating the uitlanders with contempt; Kruger retorted: "I have no contempt for the new population, only for people like yourself." The riot was broken up by police and the Chamber of Mines issued an apology, which Kruger accepted, saying only a few of the uitlanders had taken part. Few Boers were as conciliatory as Kruger; Meintjes marks this as "the point where the rift between the Transvaalers and the uitlanders began".

=== Early 1890s ===
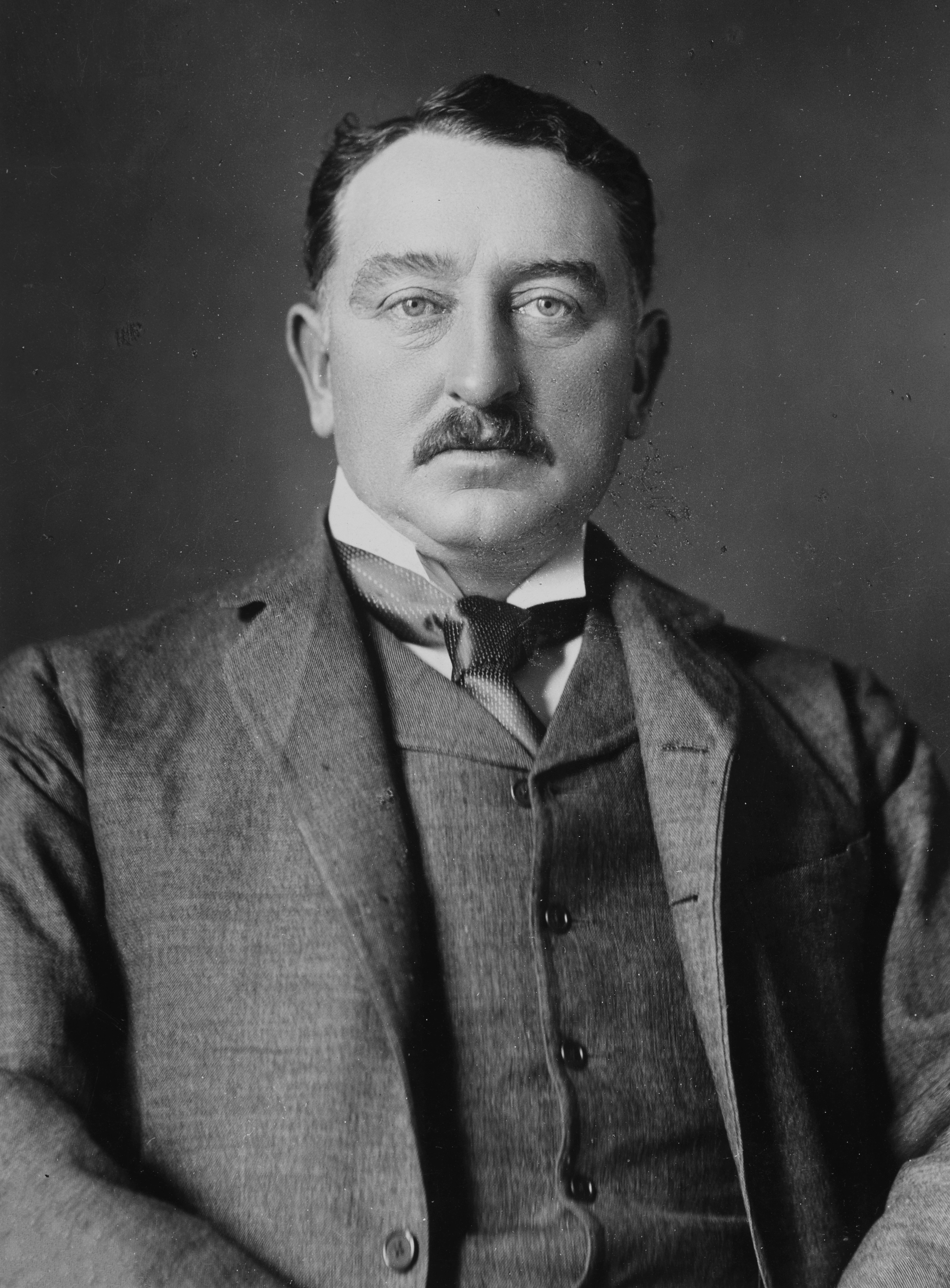
Cecil Rhodes, the Prime Minister of the Cape Colony from 1890

In mid-March 1890 Kruger met the new British High Commissioner and Governor Sir Henry Brougham Loch, Loch's legal adviser William Philip Schreiner, and Rhodes, who had by now attained a dominant position in the Transvaal's mining industry and a royal charter for his British South Africa Company to occupy and administer Matabeleland and Mashonaland. A group of Transvaalers planned to emigrate to Mashonaland—the so-called Bowler Trek—and Rhodes was keen to stop this lest it interfere with his own plans. He and Loch offered to support Kruger in his plan to acquire a port at Kosi Bay and link it to the Transvaal through Swaziland if in return the Transvaal would enter a South African customs union and pledge not to expand northwards. Kruger made no commitments, thinking this union might easily turn into the federation Britain had pursued years before, but on his return to Pretoria forbade any Boer trek to Mashonaland.

Rhodes became prime minister of the Cape Colony in July 1890. A month later the British and Transvaalers agreed to joint control over Swaziland (without consulting the Swazis)—the South African Republic could build a railway through it to Kosi Bay on the condition that the Transvaal thereafter supported the interests of Rhodes's Chartered Company in Matabeleland and its environs. (Note: Two more conventions over Swaziland followed, the latter of which in December 1894 made it a protectorate of the South African Republic.) Kruger honoured the latter commitment in 1891 when he outlawed the Adendorff Trek, another would-be emigration to Mashonaland, over the protests of Joubert and many others. This, along with his handling of the economy and the civil service—now widely perceived as overloaded with Dutch imports—caused opposition to grow. The industrial monopolies Kruger's administration granted became widely derided as corrupt and inefficient, especially the dynamite concession given to Edouard Lippert and a French consortium, which Kruger was forced to revoke in 1892 amid much scandal over misrepresentation and price gouging. (Note: The same year Kruger cheerfully accepted an invitation to inaugurate a synagogue in Johannesburg. According to an oft-repeated but perhaps apocryphal story, both denied and affirmed by eye-witnesses, he gave a short speech, then "in the name of our Lord, Jesus Christ" declared the synagogue open.)

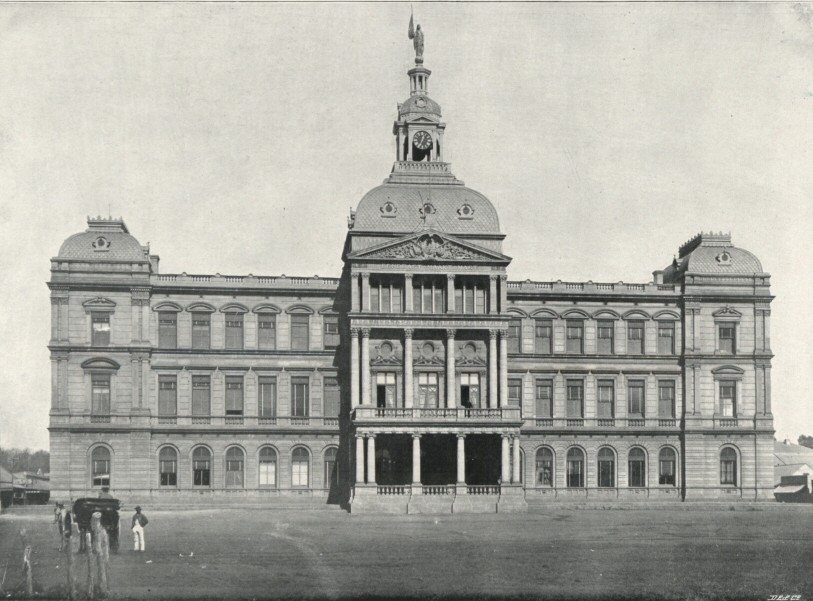
The Raadsaal, the Transvaal government building in Church Square, Pretoria

Kruger's second volksraad sat for the first time in 1891. Any resolution it passed had to be ratified by the first volksraad; its role was in effect largely advisory. Uitlanders could vote in elections for the second volksraad after two years' residency on the condition they were naturalised as burghers—a process requiring the renunciation of any foreign allegiance. The residency qualification for naturalised burghers to join the first volksraad electorate was raised from five to 14 years, with the added criterion that they had to be at least 40 years old. During the close-run campaign for the 1893 election, in which Kruger was again challenged by Joubert with the Chief Justice John Gilbert Kotzé as a third candidate, the President indicated that he was prepared to lower the 14-year residency requirement so long as it would not risk the subversion of the state's independence. The electoral result was announced as 7,854 votes for Kruger, 7,009 for Joubert, and 81 for Kotzé. Joubert's supporters alleged procedural irregularities and demanded a recount; the ballots were counted twice more and although the results varied slightly each time, every count gave Kruger a majority. Joubert conceded and Kruger was inaugurated for the third time on 12 May 1893.

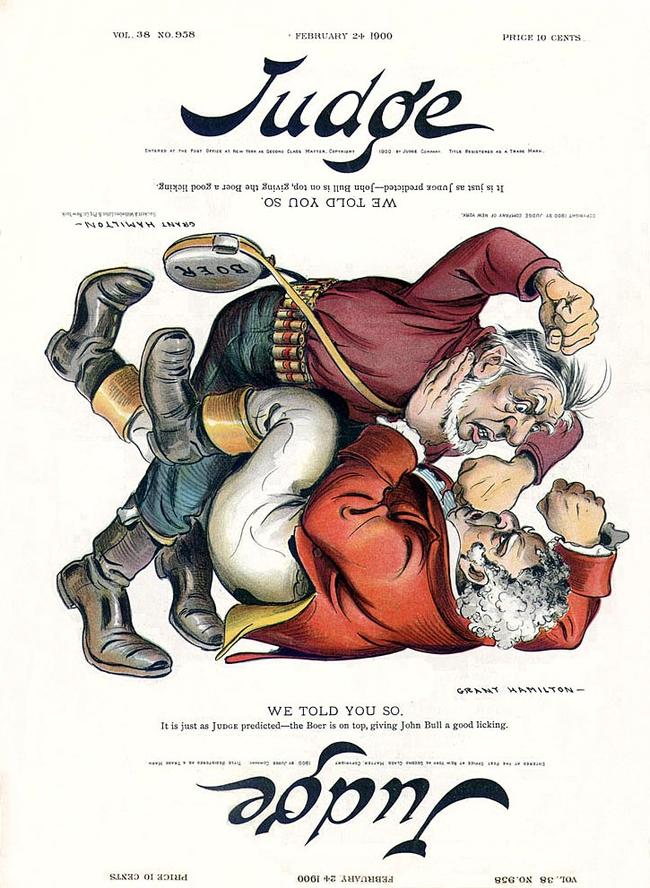
A satirical cartoon depicting a skirmish, with John Bull and Oom Paul, a figure resembling Paul Kruger, coming to life as personifications of British imperialism and Afrikaner resistance.

Kruger was by this time widely perceived as a personification of Afrikanerdom both at home and abroad. When he stopped going to the government offices at the Raadsaal by foot and began to be conveyed there by a presidential carriage, his coming and going became a public spectacle not unlike the Changing of the Guard in Britain. "Once seen, he is not easily forgotten", wrote Lady Phillips. "His greasy frock coat and antiquated tall hat have been portrayed times without number ... and I think his character is clearly to be read in his face—strength of character and cunning."

=== Rising tensions: raiders and reformers ===
By 1894 the Kosi Bay scheme had been abandoned and the Delagoa Bay line was almost complete, and the railways from Natal and the Cape had reached Johannesburg. (Note: Kruger allowed the British railways to enter first in return for Rhodes's help funding the Delagoa Bay line's final sections.) Chief Malaboch's insurgency in the north compelled Joubert to call up a commando and the State Artillery in May 1894. Those drafted included British subjects, the large majority of whom indignantly refused to report, feeling that as foreigners they should be exempted. (Note: The Commando Law of 1883 identified all residents as eligible for military service, but the South African Republic had since made agreements with the Netherlands, Germany, Italy, Portugal, Belgium and Switzerland not to draft their nationals. The British subjects thought they should have the same exemption.) Kotzé's ruling that British nationality did not preclude one from conscription as a Transvaal resident prompted an outpouring of displeasure from the uitlanders that manifested itself when Loch visited Pretoria the following month. Protesters waited for Kruger and Loch to enter the presidential coach at the railway station, then unharnessed the horses, attached a Union Jack and raucously dragged the carriage to Loch's hotel. Embarrassed, Loch complied with Kruger's request that he should not go on to Johannesburg. Kruger announced that "the government will, in the meantime, provisionally, no more commandeer British subjects for personal military service". In his memoirs, he alleged that Loch secretly conferred with the uitlanders' National Union at this time about how long the miners could hold Johannesburg by arms without British help. (Note: Meintjes upholds this claim, citing a letter written by the magnate Lionel Phillips on 1 July 1894 making reference to such discussions.)

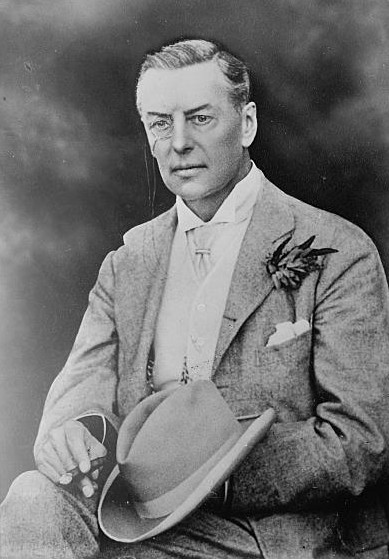
Joseph Chamberlain, the British Colonial Secretary

The following year the National Union sent Kruger a petition bearing 38,500 signatures requesting electoral reform. Kruger dismissed all such entreaties with the assertion that enfranchising "these new-comers, these disobedient persons" might imperil the republic's independence. "Protest!" he shouted at one uitlander deputation; "What is the use of protesting? I have the guns, you haven't." The Johannesburg press became intensely hostile to the President personally, using the term "Krugerism" to encapsulate all the republic's perceived injustices. In August 1895, after gauging burghers' views from across the country, the first volksraad rejected the opposition's bill to give all uitlanders the vote by 14 ballots to 10. Kruger said this did not extend to those who had "proved their trustworthiness", and conferred burgher rights on all uitlanders who had served in Transvaal commandos.

The Delagoa Bay railway line was completed in December 1894—the realisation of a great personal ambition for Kruger, who tightened the final bolt of "our national railway" personally. The formal opening in July 1895 was a gala affair with leading figures from all the neighbouring territories present, including Loch's successor Sir Hercules Robinson. "This railway changed the whole internal situation in the Transvaal", Kruger wrote in his autobiography. "Until that time, the Cape railway had enjoyed a monopoly, so to speak, of the Johannesburg traffic." Difference of opinion between Kruger and Rhodes over the distribution of the profits from customs duties led to the Drifts Crisis of September–October 1895: the Cape Colony avoided the Transvaal railway fees by using wagons instead. Kruger's closure of the drifts (fords) in the Vaal River where the wagons crossed prompted Rhodes to call for support from Britain on the grounds that the London Convention was being breached. The Colonial Secretary Joseph Chamberlain told Kruger if he did not reopen the drifts Britain would do so by force; Kruger backed down.

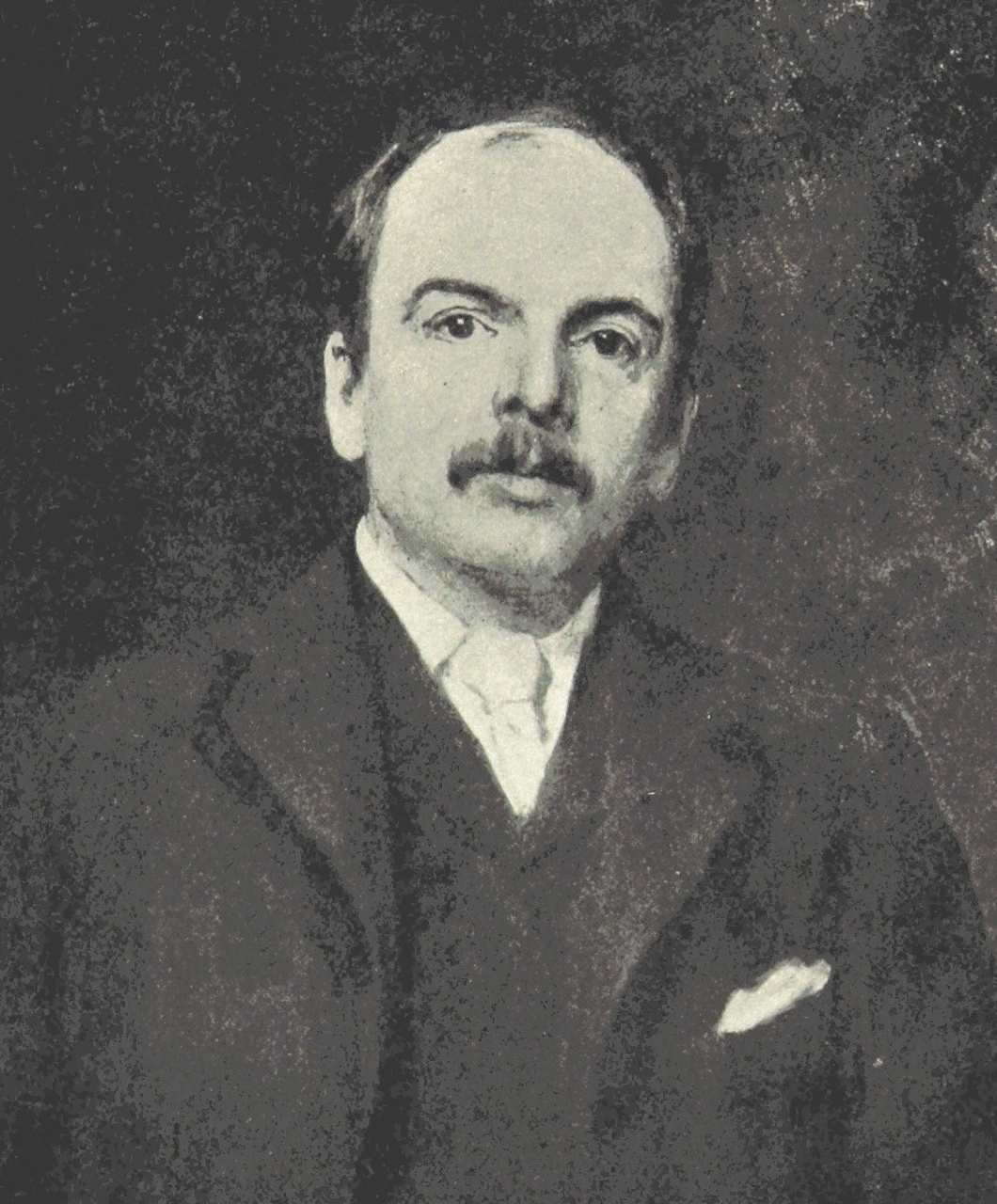
Leander Starr Jameson, leader of the eponymous raid into the Transvaal in 1895–96

Understanding that renewed hostilities with Britain were now a real possibility, Kruger began to pursue armament. Relations with Germany had been warming for some time; when Leyds went there for medical treatment in late 1895, he took with him an order from the Transvaal government for rifles and munitions. Conferring with the Colonial Office, Rhodes pondered the co-ordination of an uitlander revolt in Johannesburg with British military intervention, and had a force of about 500 marshalled on the Bechuanaland–Transvaal frontier under Leander Starr Jameson, the Chartered Company's administrator in Matabeleland. On 29 December 1895, ostensibly following an urgent plea from the Johannesburg Reform Committee (as the National Union now called itself), these troops crossed the border and rode for the Witwatersrand—the Jameson Raid had begun.

Jameson's force failed to cut all of the telegraph wires, allowing a rural Transvaal official to raise the alarm early, though there are suggestions Kruger had been tipped off some days before. (Note: The President always denied such claims, but Meintjes suggests he "must have known", citing the two prior warnings Joubert received. The fact remains that most of the Transvaal government and citizenry were caught by surprise.) Joubert called up the burghers and rode west to meet Jameson. Robinson publicly repudiated Jameson's actions and ordered him back, but Jameson ignored him and pushed on towards Johannesburg; Robinson wired Kruger offering to come immediately for talks. The Reform Committee's efforts to rally the uitlanders for revolt floundered, partly because not all of the mine-owners (or "Randlords") were supportive, and by 31 December the conspirators had raised a makeshift vierkleur over their headquarters at the offices of Rhodes's Gold Fields company, signalling their capitulation. Unaware of this, Jameson continued until he was forced to surrender to Piet Cronjé on 2 January 1896.

A congratulatory telegram to Kruger from Kaiser Wilhelm II on 3 January prompted a storm of anti-Boer and anti-German feeling in Britain, with Jameson becoming lionised as a result. Kruger shouted down talk of the death penalty for the imprisoned Jameson or a campaign of retribution against Johannesburg, challenging his more bellicose commandants to depose him if they disagreed, and accepted Robinson's proposed mediation with alacrity. After confiscating the weapons and munitions the Reform Committee had stockpiled, Kruger handed Jameson and his troops over to British custody and granted amnesty to all the Johannesburg conspirators except for 64 leading members, who were charged with high treason. The four main leaders—Lionel Phillips, John Hays Hammond, George Farrar and Frank Rhodes (brother of Cecil)—pleaded guilty in April 1896 and were sentenced to hang, but Kruger quickly had this commuted to fines of £25,000 each.

=== Resurgence ===
The Jameson Raid ruined Rhodes's political reputation in the Cape and lost him his longstanding support from the Afrikaner Bond; he resigned as prime minister of the Cape Colony on 12 January. Kruger's handling of the affair made his name a household word across the world and won him much support from Afrikaners in the Cape and the Orange Free State, who began to visit Pretoria in large numbers. The President granted personal audiences to travellers and writers such as Olive Schreiner and Frank Harris, and wore the knightly orders of the Netherlands, Portugal, Belgium and France on his sash of state. Jameson was jailed by the British but released after four months. The republic made armament one of its main priorities, ordering huge quantities of rifles, munitions, field guns and howitzers, primarily from Germany and France.

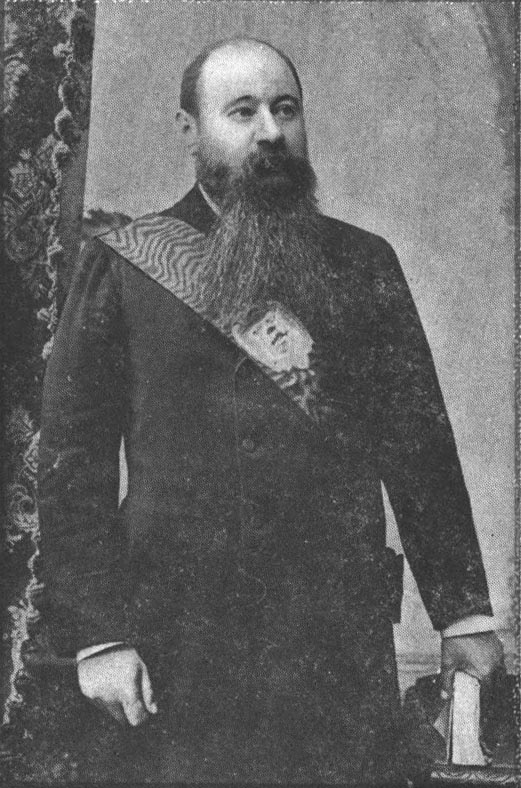
President Marthinus Theunis Steyn of the Orange Free State

In March 1896 Marthinus Theunis Steyn, the young lawyer Kruger had encountered on the ship to England two decades earlier, became President of the Orange Free State. They quickly won each other's confidence; each man's memoirs would describe the other in glowing terms. (Note: Steyn is described in Kruger's autobiography as "one of the greatest and noblest men that have seen the light of South Africa". Working alongside Kruger, Steyn wrote, was "one of my greatest privileges".) Chamberlain began to take exception to the South African Republic's diplomatic actions, such as joining the Geneva Convention, which he said breached Article IV of the London Convention (which forbade extraterritorial dealings except vis-a-vis the Orange Free State). Chamberlain asserted that the Transvaal was still under British suzerainty, a claim Kruger called "nonsensical". Kruger and Steyn concluded a treaty of trade and friendship in Bloemfontein in March 1897, along with a fresh military alliance binding each republic to defend the other's independence. Two months later Sir Alfred Milner became the new high commissioner and governor in Cape Town.

Kruger developed a habit of threatening to resign whenever the volksraad did not give him his way. In the 1897 session there was much surprise when the new member Louis Botha reacted to the usual proffered resignation by leaping up and moving to accept it. A constitutional crisis developed after the judiciary under Chief Justice Kotzé abandoned its prior stance of giving volksraad resolutions legal precedence over the constitution. "This decision would have upset the whole country", Kruger recalled, "for a number of rules concerning the goldfields, the franchise and so on depended on resolutions of the volksraad." Chief Justice De Villiers of the Cape mediated, sided with Kruger and upheld the volksraad decrees. (Note: In late 1897 Joshua Slocum, who was attempting to become the first to sail single-handedly around the globe, disembarked in Cape Town and was presented to Kruger in Pretoria. On hearing Slocum intended to circumnavigate the Earth, Kruger retorted: "You don't mean round the world, it is impossible! You mean in the world. Impossible! Impossible!" and refused to say another word to him. Slocum completed his circumnavigation the following year and in 1900 released a memoir about it, Sailing Alone Around the World, in which he recalled his meeting with Kruger fondly: "the incident pleased me more than anything else that could have happened.")

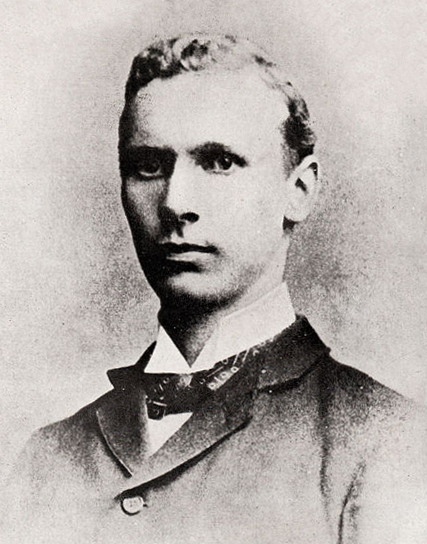
Jan Smuts, Kruger's State Attorney from 1898

Kruger was never more popular domestically than during the 1897–98 election campaign, and indeed was widely perceived to be jollier than he had been in years. He won his most decisive election victory yet—12,853 votes to Joubert's 2,001 and Schalk Willem Burger's 3,753—and was sworn in as president for the fourth time on 12 May 1898. After a three-hour inauguration address, his longest speech as president, his first act of his fourth term was to sack Kotzé, who was still claiming the right to test legislation in the courts. To Kruger's critics this lent much credence to the notion that he was a tyrant. Milner called Kotzé's dismissal "the end of real justice in the Transvaal" and a step that "threatened all British subjects and interests there". (Note: Kotzé's replacement as Chief Justice was Reinhold Gregorowski.)

Kruger's final administration was, Meintjes suggests, the strongest in the history of the republic. He had the former Free State President F W Reitz as State Secretary from June 1898 and Leyds, who set up an office in Brussels, as Envoy Extraordinary in Europe. The post of State Attorney was given to a young lawyer from the Cape called Jan Smuts, for whom Kruger presaged great things. (Note: Kruger predicted in his 1902 autobiography that Smuts would "play a great part in the future history of South Africa".) The removal of Leyds to Europe marked the end of Kruger's longstanding policy of giving important government posts to Dutchmen; convinced of Cape Afrikaners' sympathy following the Jameson Raid, he preferred them from this point on.

=== Road to war ===
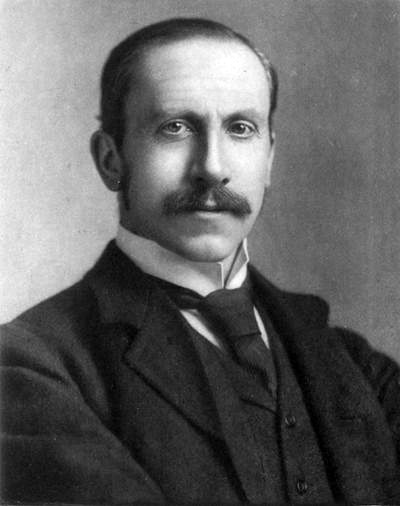
Sir Alfred Milner, the British High Commissioner for Southern Africa

Anglo-German relations warmed during late 1898, with Berlin disavowing any interest in the Transvaal; this opened the way for Milner and Chamberlain to take a firmer line against Kruger. The so-called "Edgar case" of early 1899, in which a South African Republic Policeman was acquitted of manslaughter after shooting a British subject dead during an attempted arrest, prompted outcry from the British element in the Transvaal and is highlighted by Nathan as "the starting point of the final agitation which led to war".

The South African League, a new uitlander movement, prepared two petitions, each with more than 20,000 signatures, that appealed to Queen Victoria for intervention against the Transvaal government, which they called inefficient, corrupt and oppressive. Other uitlanders produced a counter-petition in which about as many affirmed their satisfaction with Kruger's government. Attempting to address the main point of contention raised by Milner and Chamberlain, Kruger spoke of reducing the residency qualification for foreigners to nine years or perhaps less. In May and June 1899 he and Milner met in Bloemfontein, with Steyn taking on the role of mediator. "You must make concessions on the franchise issue", Steyn counselled. "Franchise after a residence of 14 years is in conflict with the first principles of a republican and democratic government. The Free State expects you to concede ... Should you not give in on this issue, you will lose all sympathy and all your friends." Kruger answered that he had already indicated his willingness to lower the franchise and was "prepared to do anything"—"but they must not touch my independence", he said. "They must be reasonable in their demands."

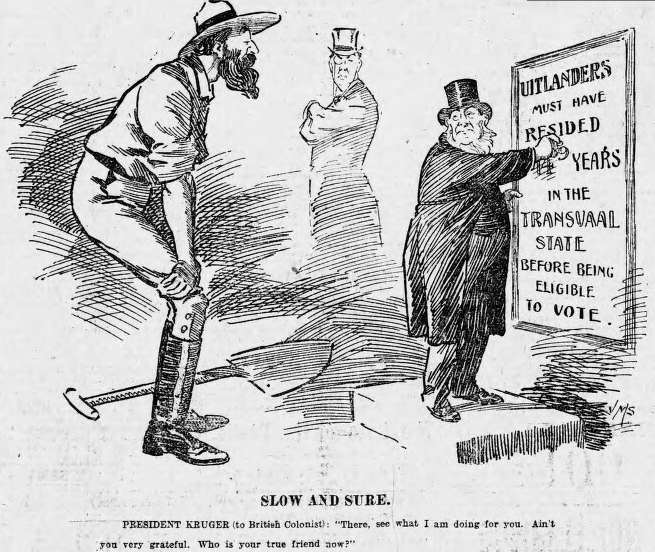
British press depiction of Kruger attempting to appease the uitlanders; Joseph Chamberlain looks on, unimpressed, in the background

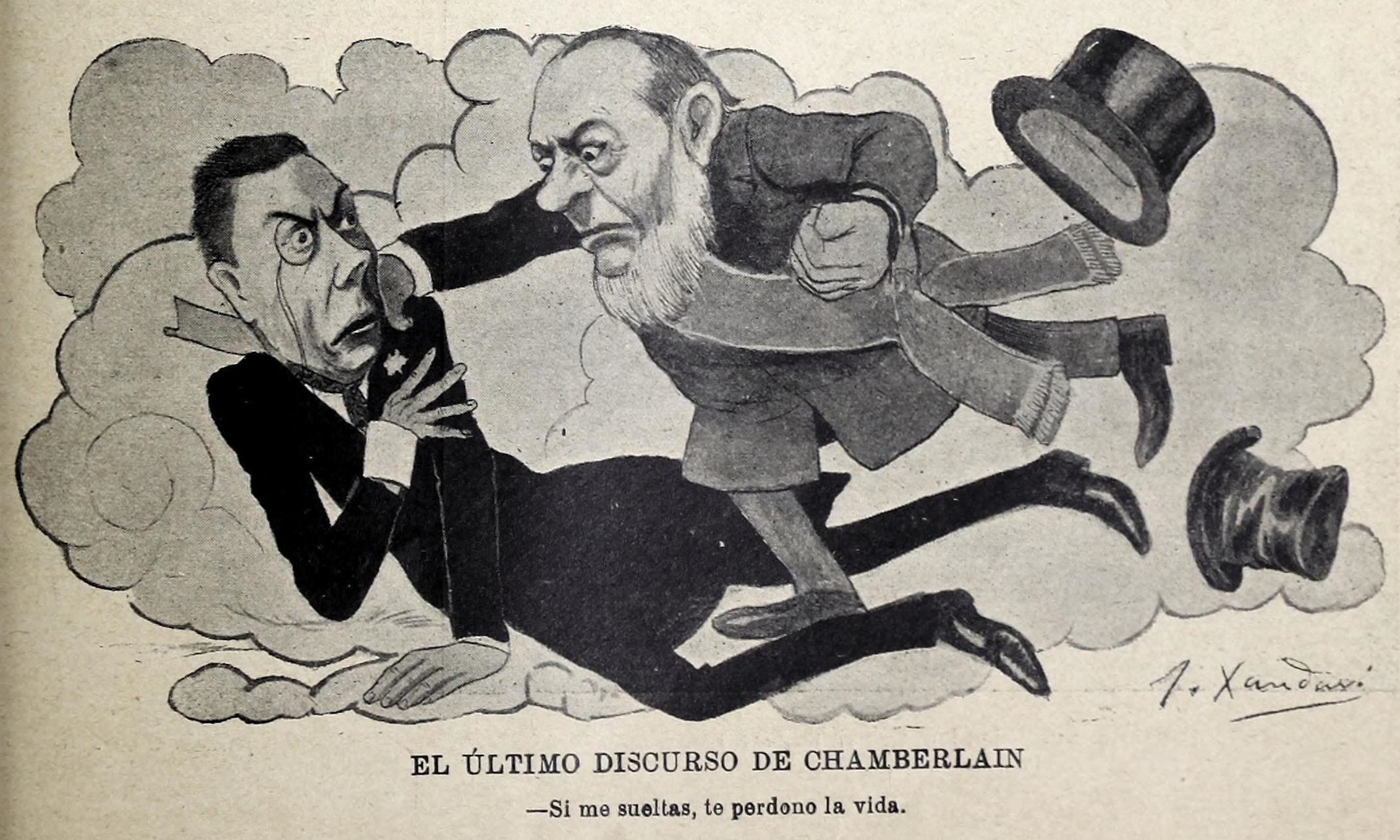
Spanish press depiction of Kruger and Chamberlain

Milner wanted full voting rights after five years' residence, a revised naturalisation oath and increased legislative representation for the new burghers. Kruger offered naturalisation after two years' residence and full franchise after five more (seven years, effectively) along with increased representation and a new oath similar to that of the Free State. The High Commissioner declared his original request an "irreducible minimum" and said he would discuss nothing else until the franchise question was resolved. On 5 June Milner proposed an advisory council of non-burghers to represent the uitlanders, prompting Kruger to cry: "How can strangers rule my state? How is it possible!" When Milner said he did not foresee this council taking on any governing role, Kruger burst into tears, saying "It is our country you want". Milner ended the conference that evening, saying the further meetings Steyn and Kruger wanted were unnecessary.

Back in Pretoria Kruger introduced a draft law to give the mining regions four more seats in each volksraad and fix a seven-year residency period for voting rights. This would not be retroactive, but up to two years' prior residence would be counted towards the seven, and uitlanders already in the country for nine years or more would get the vote immediately. (Note: Under this bill the enfranchisement of individual uitlanders would depend on conditions such as never having been "guilty of any crime against the independence of the country", and on "the personal acquaintance of the field cornets and landdrosts of the wards and districts in which they lived". These officials would be asked to attest to the prospective voter's domicile, uninterrupted registration and obedience to the law. Alternatively two "more than respectable" burghers could recommend an uitlander of seven years' residence for the franchise if they had both known him as long as he had lived in the country.) Jan Hendrik Hofmeyr of the Afrikaner Bond persuaded Kruger to make this fully retrospective (to immediately enfranchise all white men in the country seven years or more), but Milner and the South African League deemed this insufficient. After Kruger rejected the British proposal of a joint commission on the franchise law, Smuts and Reitz proposed a five-year retroactive franchise and the extension of a quarter of the volksraad seats to the Witwatersrand region, on the condition that Britain drop any claim to suzerainty. Chamberlain issued an ultimatum in September 1899 in which he insisted on five years without conditions, else the British would "formulate their own proposals for a final settlement".

Kruger resolved that war was inevitable, comparing the Boers' position to that of a man attacked by a lion with only a pocketknife for defence. "Would you be such a coward as not to defend yourself with your pocketknife?" he posited. Aware of the deployment of British troops from elsewhere in the Empire, Kruger and Smuts surmised that from a military standpoint the Boers' only chance was a swift pre-emptive strike. Steyn was anxious that they not be seen as the aggressors and insisted they delay until there was absolutely no hope of peace. He informed Kruger on 9 October that he also now thought war unavoidable; that afternoon the Transvaal government handed the British envoy Conyngham Greene an ultimatum advising that if Britain did not withdraw all troops from the border within 48 hours, a state of war would exist. The British government considered the conditions impossible and informed Kruger of this on 11 October 1899. The start of the Second Boer War was announced in Pretoria that day, at 17:00 local time.

=== Second Boer War ===
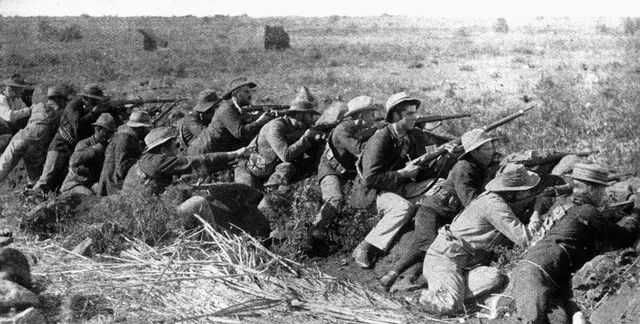
A Boer trench during the siege of Mafeking

The outbreak of war raised Kruger's international profile even further. In countries antagonistic to Britain he was idolised; Kruger expressed high hopes of German, French or Russian military intervention, despite the repeated despatches from Leyds telling him this was a fantasy. Kruger took no part in the fighting, partly because of his age and poor health—he turned 74 the week war broke out—but perhaps primarily to prevent his being killed or captured. His personal contributions to the military campaign were mostly from his office in Pretoria, where he oversaw the war effort and advised his officers by telegram. The Boer commandos, including four of Kruger's sons, six sons-in-law and 33 of his grandsons, advanced quickly into the Cape and Natal, won a series of victories and by the end of October were besieging Kimberley, Ladysmith and Mafeking. Soon thereafter, following a serious injury to Joubert, Kruger appointed Louis Botha to be acting commandant-general.

The British relief of Kimberley and Ladysmith in February 1900 marked the turning of the war against the Boers. Morale plummeted among the commandos over the following months, with many burghers simply going home; Kruger toured the front in response and asserted that any man who deserted in this time of need should be shot. He had hoped for large numbers of Cape Afrikaners to rally to the republican cause, but only small bands did so, along with a few thousand foreign volunteers (principally Dutchmen, Germans and Scandinavians). When British troops entered Bloemfontein on 13 March 1900 Reitz and others urged Kruger to destroy the gold mines, but he refused on the grounds that this would obstruct rehabilitation after the war. Mafeking was relieved two months later and on 30 May Lord Roberts took Johannesburg. Kruger left Pretoria on 29 May, travelling by train to Machadodorp, and on 2 June the government abandoned the capital. Roberts entered three days later.

With the major towns and the railways under British control, the conventional phase of the war ended; Kruger wired Steyn pondering surrender, but the Free State President insisted they fight "to the bitter end". Kruger found new strength in Steyn and telegrammed all Transvaal officers forbidding the laying down of arms. Bittereinders ("bitter-enders") under Botha, Christiaan de Wet and Koos de la Rey took to the veld and waged a guerrilla campaign. British forces under Lord Kitchener applied a scorched earth policy in response, destroying the farmsteads owned by Boer guerillas still active in the field; non-combatants (mostly women and children) were put into what the British dubbed "concentration camps". (Note: The British commanders asserted humanitarian motives, saying the camps were meant to house Boer dependants who would otherwise roam the veld as unprotected refugees. Kitchener considered the internment of the Boer women desirable from a tactical standpoint, arguing that they made "every farm ... an intelligence agency and a supply depot", and might, by their absence, induce a Boer surrender. Separate camps housed black Africans. By the end of the war over 26,000 Boer women and children had died in these overcrowded, insanitary and badly run camps from disease.) Kruger moved to Waterval Onder, where his small house became the "Krugerhof", in late June. After Roberts announced the annexation of the South African Republic to the British Empire on 1 September 1900—the Free State had been annexed on 24 May—Kruger proclaimed on 3 September that this was "not recognised" and "declared null and void". It was decided in the following days that to prevent his capture Kruger would leave for Lourenço Marques and there board ship for Europe. Officially he was to tour the continent, and perhaps America too, to raise support for the Boer cause. (Note: The South African Republic government continued with Schalk Willem Burger as Acting President.)

== Exile and death ==
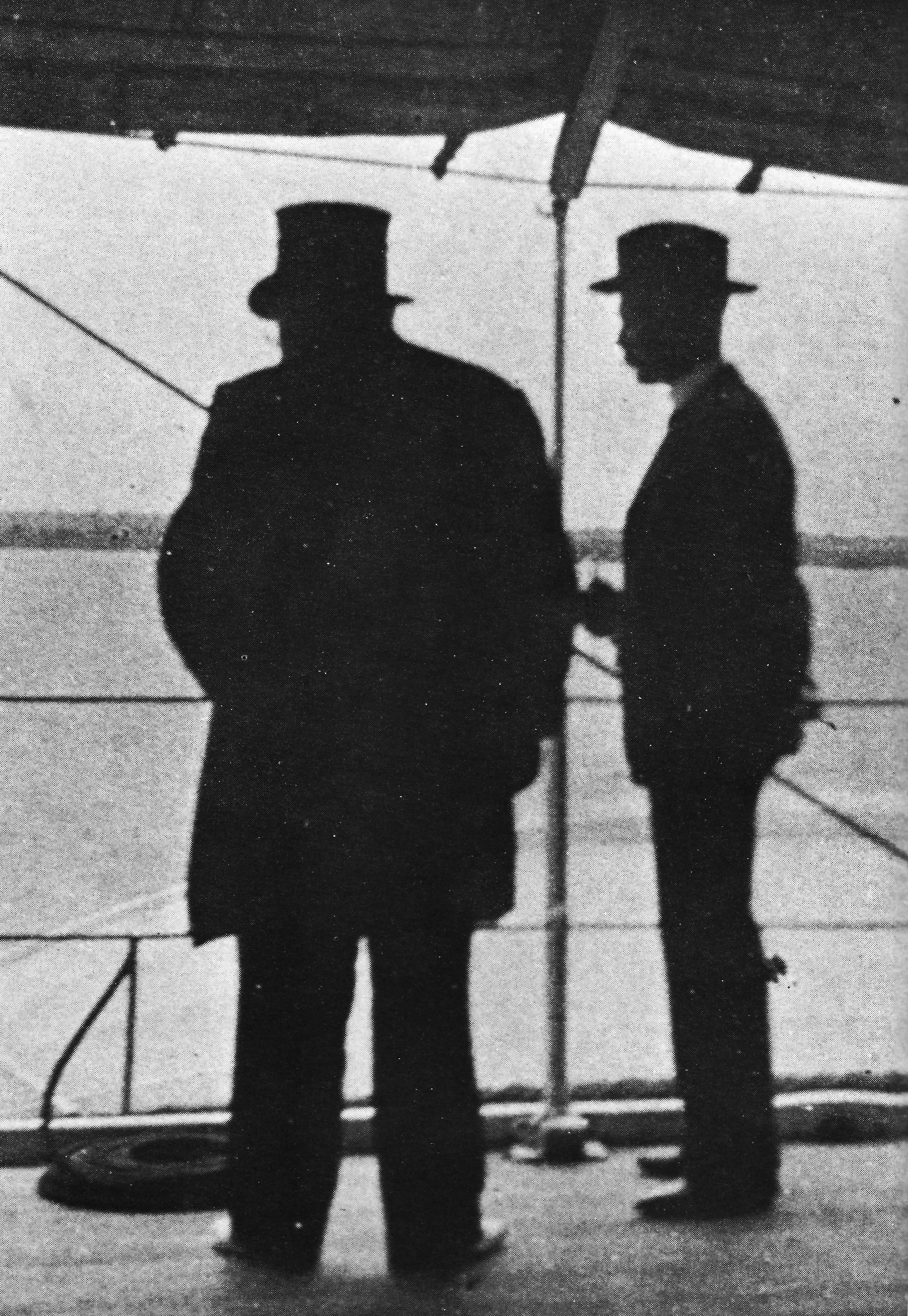
Kruger leaving for Europe in 1900—he would never return. At right is his secretary Madie Bredell.

Kruger left the Transvaal by rail on 11 September 1900—he wept as the train crossed into Mozambique. He planned to board the first outgoing steamer, the Herzog of the German East Africa Line, but was prevented from doing so when, at the behest of the local British Consul, the Portuguese Governor insisted that Kruger stay in port under house arrest. (Note: Kruger did not comment on this treatment by the Portuguese, but his secretary Madie Bredell noticed that he never again wore his Portuguese decoration.) About a month later Queen Wilhelmina of the Netherlands concluded a deal with Britain to extricate Kruger on a Dutch warship, HNLMS Gelderland, and convey him through non-British waters to Marseille. Kruger was delighted to hear of this but dismayed that Gezina, still in Pretoria, was not well enough to accompany him. Gelderland departed on 20 October 1900.

He received a rapturous welcome in Marseille on 22 November—60,000 people turned out to see him disembark. Accompanied by Leyds, he went on to an exuberant reception in Paris, then continued to Cologne on 1 December. Here the public greeted him with similar excitement, but Kaiser Wilhelm II refused to receive him in Berlin. Having apparently still harboured hopes of German assistance in the war, Kruger was deeply shocked. "The Kaiser has betrayed us", he told Leyds. They went on to the Netherlands, which was strictly neutral and could not assist militarily, but would feel more like home. After another buoyant reception from the general public, Kruger was cordially received by Wilhelmina and her family in The Hague, but it soon became clear to Leyds that it embarrassed the Dutch authorities to have them stay in the seat of government. The Kruger party moved to Hilversum in April 1901.

Gezina, with whom Kruger had had 16 children—nine sons, seven daughters (of whom some died young)—had eight sickly grandchildren transferred to her from the concentration camp at Krugersdorp, where their mother had died, in July 1901. Five of the eight children died within nine days, and two weeks later Gezina also died. (Note: It was said by this time that the Kruger children, grandchildren and great-grandchildren together totalled over 200.) Meintjes writes that a "strange silence" enveloped Kruger thereafter. By now partially blind and almost totally deaf, he dictated his memoirs to his secretary Hermanus Christiaan "Madie" Bredell and Pieter Grobler during the latter part of 1901, and the following year they were published. (Note: The original text was in Dutch, but the first edition of the memoirs to appear was that in German, edited by the Reverend Dr A Schowalter. The Dutch version and an English translation by Alexander Teixeira de Mattos shortly followed.) Kruger and his entourage relocated in December 1901 to Utrecht, where he took a comfortable villa called "Oranjelust" and was joined by his daughter Elsje Eloff and her family.

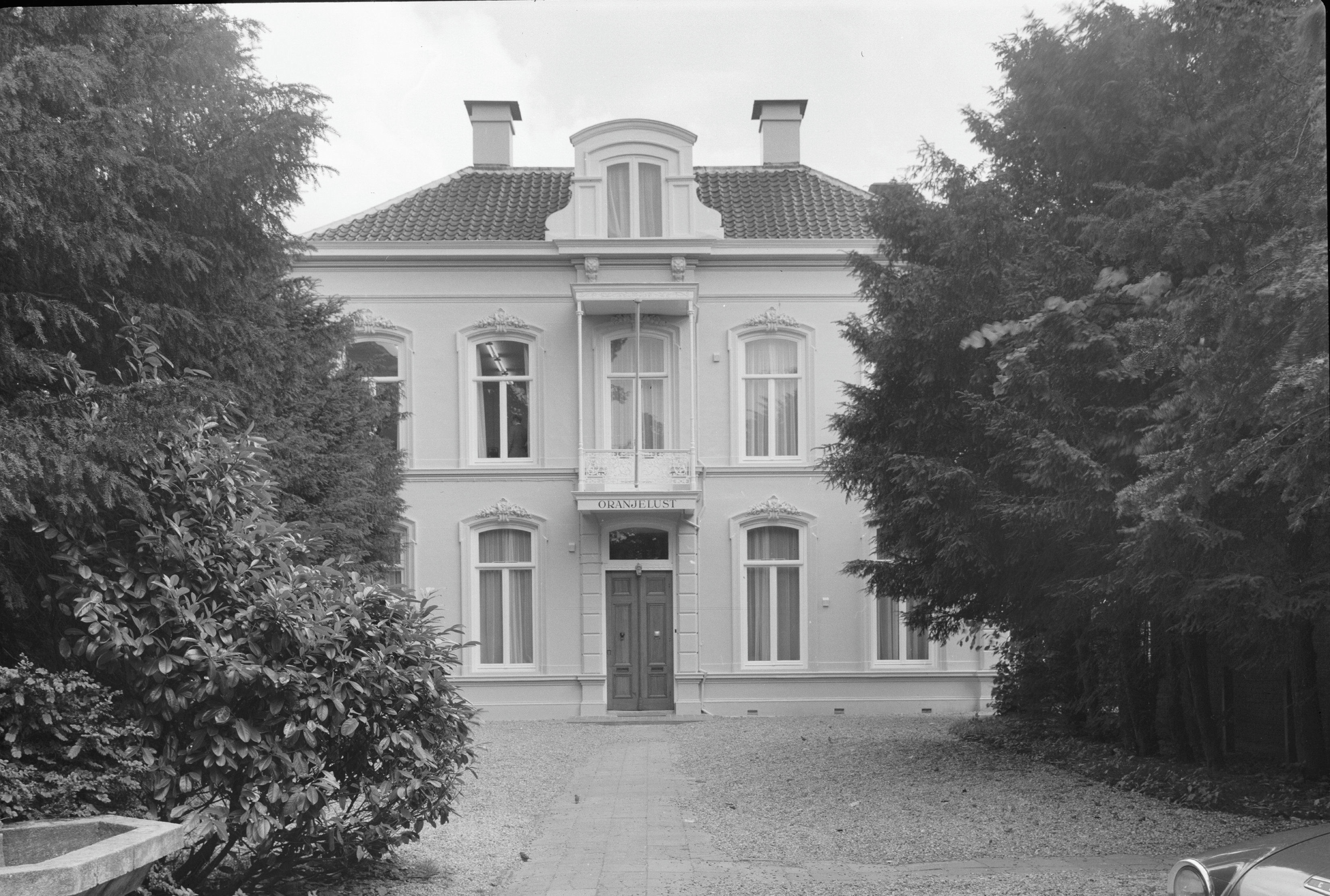
Oranjelust, Kruger's home in Utrecht, photographed in 1963

Rhodes died in March 1902, bequeathing Groote Schuur to be the official residence for future premiers of a unified South Africa. Kruger quipped to Bredell: "Perhaps I'll be the first." The war formally ended on 31 May 1902 with the signing of the Treaty of Vereeniging; the Boer republics became the Orange River and Transvaal Colonies. Kruger accepted it was all over only when Bredell had the flags of the South African Republic and the Orange Free State removed from outside Oranjelust two weeks later. In reply to condolences from Germany, Kruger would only say: "My grief is beyond expression."

Kruger would not countenance the idea of returning home, partly because of personal reluctance to become a British subject again, and partly because he thought he could better serve his people by remaining in exile. Steyn similarly refused to accept the Boer defeat and joined Kruger in Europe, though he did later return to Southern Africa. Botha, De Wet and De la Rey visited Oranjelust in August 1902 and, according to hearsay, were berated by Kruger for "signing away independence"—rumours of such a scene were widespread enough that the generals issued a statement denying them.

After passing from October 1902 to May 1903 at Menton on the French Riviera, Kruger moved back to Hilversum, then returned to Menton in October 1903. In early 1904 he moved to Clarens, a small village in the canton of Vaud in western Switzerland where he spent the rest of his days looking over Lake Geneva and the Alps from his balcony. "He who wishes to create a future must not lose track of the past", he wrote in his final letter, addressed to the people of the Transvaal. "Thus; seek all that is to be found good and fair in the past, shape your ideal accordingly and try to realise that ideal for the future. It is true: much that has been built is now destroyed, damaged, and levelled. But with unity of purpose and unity of strength that which has been pulled down can be built again." After contracting pneumonia, Paul Kruger died in Clarens on 14 July 1904 at the age of 78. His Bible lay open on a table beside him.

Kruger's body was initially buried in The Hague but was soon repatriated with British permission. After ceremonial lying in state, he was accorded a state funeral in Pretoria on 16 December 1904, the vierkleur of the South African Republic draped over his coffin, and buried in what is now called the Heroes' Acre in the Church Street Cemetery.

== Appraisal and legacy ==
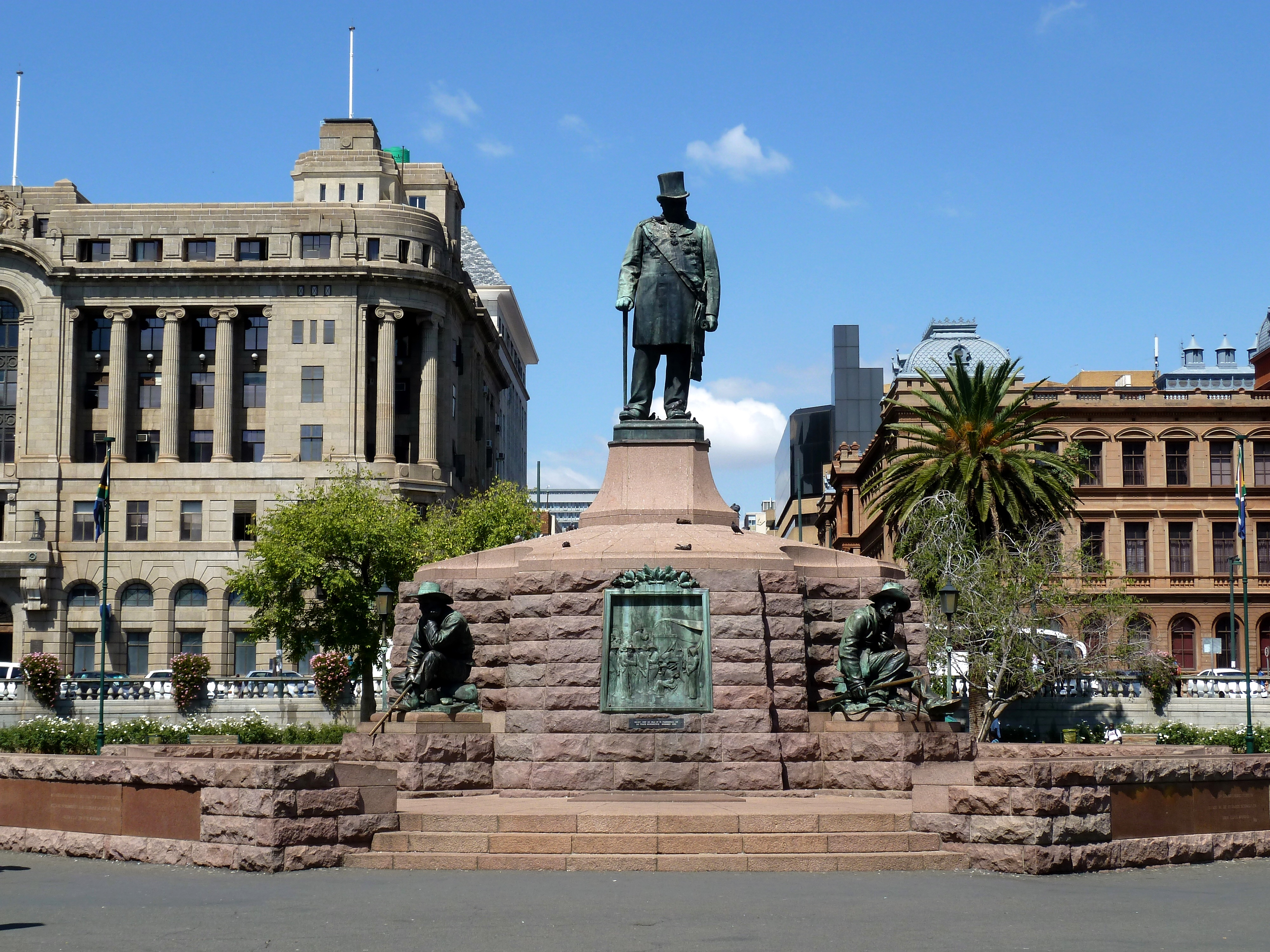
Statue of Paul Kruger in Church Square, Pretoria

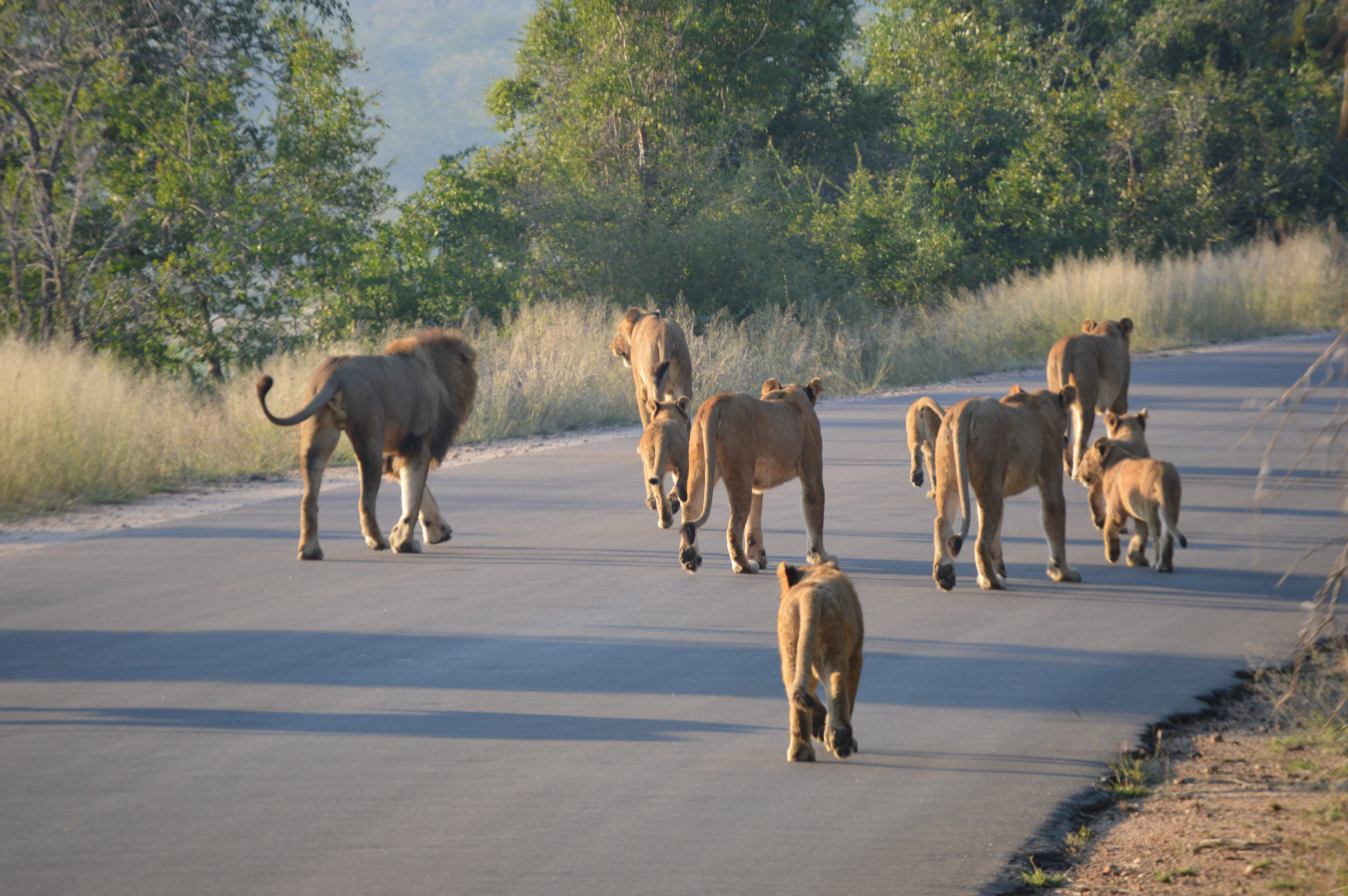
The famous Kruger National Park in Limpopo was named after him

Academic opinion on Kruger is divided. To admirers he was an astute reader of people, events and law who faithfully defended a maligned nation and became a tragic folk hero; to critics he was "an anachronistic throwback", the stubborn, slippery guardian of an unjust cause and an oppressor of black Africans. "More nonsense has been written about him than anybody I know of", writes Meintjes, in whose view the true figure has been obscured by conflicting attempts to sabotage or whitewash his image—"a veritable bog of hostility and sentiment, prejudice and deification", depicting Kruger as anything "from saint to stuffy mendacious savage". Rights and wrongs aside, Meintjes asserts, Kruger is the central figure of Boer history and one of the "most extraordinary" of South Africans.

Following the Union of South Africa under Botha in 1910, Kruger remained "a vital force in South African politics and Afrikaner culture". The government wildlife reserve he had proclaimed in 1898 was expanded and dubbed Kruger National Park in 1926. In 1954, over half a century after its construction by Anton van Wouw, a bronze statue of Kruger in his characteristic Dopper suit and top hat was erected in Church Square, Pretoria; Kruger stands atop a plinth surrounded by four crouching Boers from different time periods. Thirteen years later the South African Mint put his likeness on the Krugerrand, a gold bullion coin still produced and exported in the 21st century. His home in Pretoria and farm at Boekenhoutfontein are provincial heritage sites. The former has been preserved to appear as it did in his time.

Kruger gives his name to the town of Krugersdorp, and to many streets and squares in South Africa and other countries, especially the Netherlands and Belgium. This has, on occasion, led to controversy; in 2009 local authorities in St Gallen, Switzerland renamed Krügerstrasse "because of racist associations". Clarens, Free State is named after Kruger's last home in Switzerland. During the Second World War Kruger's life story and image were appropriated by propagandists in Nazi Germany, who produced the biographical film Ohm Krüger ("Uncle Krüger", 1941) to attack the British, with Emil Jannings in the title role. The underdevelopment of South African administrative law until the late 20th century was, Davenport asserts, the direct result of Kruger's censure and dismissal of Chief Justice Kotzé in 1898 over the question of judicial review.

"Paul Kruger's name and fame he made himself", Leyds said. "It is sometimes said that he was illiterate. This is of course nonsense ... He was certainly not learned, but he had a thorough knowledge of many things." "In the lower spheres of diplomacy Mr Kruger was a master", E B Iwan-Müller asserted. "He was quick in detecting the false moves made by his opponents, and an adept in turning them to his own advantage; but of the large combinations he was hopelessly incapable. To secure a brilliant and conspicuous success today he was ready to squander the prospects of the future, if, indeed, he had the power of forecasting them. He was what I believe soldiers would call a brilliant tactician, but a hopeless strategist." Soon after Kruger's death, Smuts told the British humanitarian campaigner Emily Hobhouse: "He typified the Boer character both in its brighter and darker aspects, and was no doubt the greatest man—both morally and intellectually—whom the Boer race has so far produced. In his iron will and tenacity, his 'never say die' attitude towards fate, his mystic faith in another world, he represented what is best in all of us."
