= Mounted infantry =

Infantry riding horses instead of marching

Mounted infantry were infantry who rode horses instead of marching. Unlike cavalry, mounted infantry dismounted to fight on foot. The original dragoons were essentially mounted infantry. According to the Encyclopædia Britannica Eleventh Edition (1910–1911), "Mounted rifles are half cavalry, mounted infantry merely specially mobile infantry." Today, with motor vehicles having replaced horses for military transport, the motorized infantry are in some respects successors to mounted infantry.

== History ==
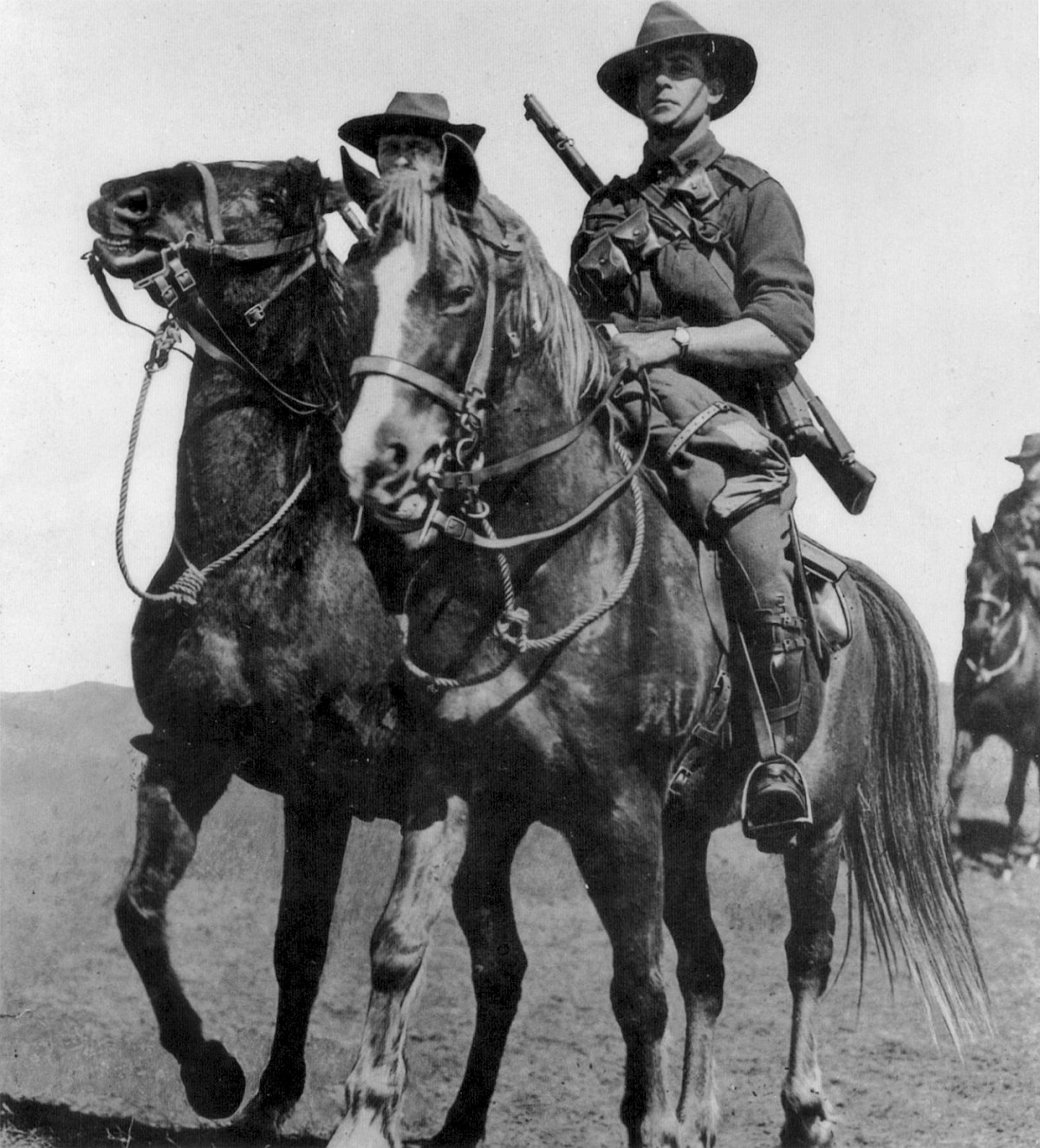
Two Australian light horsemen in 1914

=== Pre-gunpowder ===
The origins of mounted infantry go back to at least the beginnings of organised warfare. With the weight of ancient bronze armor, the opposing champions would travel to battle on chariots before dismounting to fight. With the evolution of hoplite warfare, some hoplites would travel to battle on horseback, before dismounting to take their place in the phalanx.

In the Macedonian army of the 4th Century BCE, the Dimachae were cavalry units who also fought on foot when necessary. The early pre-Marian Roman military had units consisting of infantrymen clinging to the saddles of the cavalry to take them to battle and then dismounting to fight. Gallic and Germanic warbands were reported to use double-riders, with a second warrior joining a horseman only for a short distance before dismounting to fight on foot. In Commentarii de Bello Gallico, Caesar describes how British chariot riders "...leap from their chariots and engage on foot."

The 3rd Century Han dynasty also extensively used mounted infantry in their campaigns against the Xiongnu confederation. During many of the Han campaigns, the vast majority of the army rode on horseback; either as mounted cavalry or mounted infantry who fought dismounted.

The Arabs, during their campaigns in the deserts of Mesopotamia and Syria against the Byzantines and Sassanids, used camels to enhance their mobility, marking a stark contrast to their enemies, especially in the desert environment.

The 9th Century Carolingians under Charlemagne also used horses as transport for the bulk of their army, and special care was taken to ensure the health, fodder, and availability of horses on-campaign.

In the Hundred Years' War, English men-at-arms would often fight dismounted among the infantry line, as opposed to their French counterparts who primarily fought in the traditional mounted manner. This is archetypically shown in narratives of the Battle of Agincourt. Mercenary captain John Hawkwood is often credited with introducing this tactic to Italy.

Other notable infantry to use horses to enhance their mobility include the Genoese crossbowmen, the Mapuche during the Arauco War, and Viking raiders who would gather all the horses they could find in the vicinity of their landings.

=== Dragoons ===
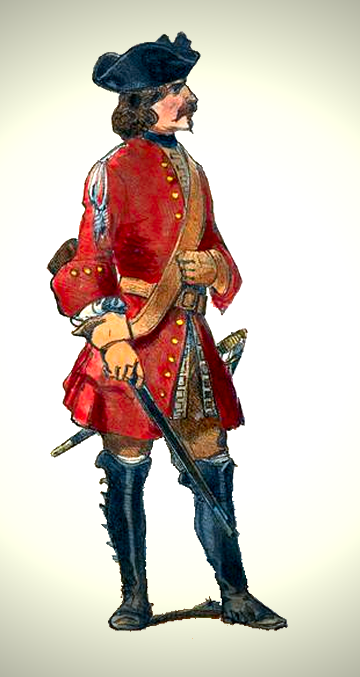
A French dragoon (c. 1700).

Dragoons originally were mounted infantry, who were trained in horse riding as well as infantry fighting skills. However, usage altered over time and during the 18th century, dragoons evolved into conventional light cavalry units and personnel. Dragoon regiments were established in most European armies during the late 17th century and early 18th century.

The name is possibly derived from a type of firearm (called a dragon) carried by dragoons of the French Army. There is no distinction between the words dragon and dragoon in French. Alternatively, it may be related to the Dutch word Dragen (or German Tragen), meaning "to carry".

The title has been retained in modern times by a number of armoured or ceremonial mounted regiments.

=== 19th century ===
By the late 19th century, the increasing firepower and accuracy of infantry weapons reduced the usefulness of traditional cavalry roles, while mounted infantry used horses for mobility but fought on foot with rifles. One early example was the United States Regiment of Mounted Riflemen, organised during the Mexican–American War and redesignated the Third Cavalry Regiment in 1861. In Australia, the Victorian Mounted Rifles were formed in December 1885, with companies recruited in rural centres and members required to provide their own mounts.

The French Foreign Legion used mule-mounted companies from the 1880s. Each mule was shared by two legionnaires, who took turns in riding it. These companies could usually cover 25–30 miles (40–50 km) a day, and in emergencies 44–50 miles (70–80 km) a day for several days. In the Western Theatre of the American Civil War, several infantry regiments were converted to mounted infantry and armed with repeating rifles. The Lightning Brigade at the Battle of Chickamauga was an example of these Union mounted infantry units. In the British Army, infantry units in some parts of the British Empire had mounted platoons for scouting and skirmishing. Colonial mounted infantry units included the Cape Mounted Rifles, Natal Carbineers, British South Africa Police and Victorian Mounted Rifles. In the Second Boer War, the British raised mounted infantry forces such as the Imperial Light Horse, South African Light Horse, Rhodesia Regiment, British South Africa Police, Marshall's Horse, Cape Mounted Riflemen and Natal Carbineers to counter the mobility of Boer commandos. Among various ad hoc formations, the Imperial Yeomanry was raised from volunteers in Britain after a Royal Warrant of 24 December 1899. During the final year of the war, as the need for artillery diminished, several battalions of mounted rifles were formed from officers and men of the Royal Artillery. After the war, British cavalry doctrine placed greater emphasis on dismounted fire, and cavalry were equipped with longer-ranged rifles rather than carbines. A shorter-barrelled Lee–Enfield Cavalry Carbine Mark I had been introduced in 1896.

=== 20th century ===
Many European armies also used bicycle infantry in a similar way that mounted infantry used horses. However they were handicapped by the need for proper roads.

The Australian 4th Light Horse Brigade which took part in the cavalry charge in the Battle of Beersheba (1917) during World War I are labelled as mounted infantry brigade in popular media; however, they were in fact mounted rifles as were the New Zealand Mounted Rifles Brigade which also took part in this battle. Mounted rifles regiments lack the mass of a mounted infantry battalions, as a light horse brigade could only muster as many rifles in the line as a single battalion. Consequently, their employment reflected this lack of mass, with the tactics seeking to harness greater mobility and fire to overcome opposition, rather than echeloned mass attacks.

Mounted infantry began to disappear with the shift from horses to motor vehicles in the 1920s and 1930s. Germany deployed a few horse-mounted infantry units on the Russian Front during the Second World War, and cyclist units on both fronts as well, and both Germany and Britain (which had used cyclist battalions in the First World War) experimented with motorcycle battalions. Germany also utilized organic horse and bicycle mounted troops within infantry formations throughout World War Two, although bicycle use increased as Germany retreated into its own territory. Japan deployed cyclists to great effect in its 1941 to 1942 campaign in Malaya and drive on Singapore during World War II. A horsed cavalry regiment of the Philippine Scouts assisted in the defense of the Philippines at the onset of World War II. The 10th Mountain Division of the U.S. Army also maintained a mounted reconnaissance troop throughout World War Two, which saw service in Italy and Austria during the war. The Grey's Scouts were a Rhodesian mounted infantry unit raised in July 1975. Named after George Grey, a British soldier and governor, it was based in Salisbury (now Harare). The Grey's Scouts patrolled the borders of Rhodesia during the Rhodesian Bush War and then went on to become a regiment of the Special Forces Of Zimbabwe in June 1980. The regiment was disbanded in July 1986 due to a lack of resources.

Countries with entrenched military traditions, such as Switzerland, retained horse-mounted troops well into the Cold War, while Sweden kept much of its infantry on bicycles during the snow-free months.

== See also ==
- Dragoons
- Foot cavalry
- Australian Light Horse
- Canadian Mounted Rifles
- Grey's Scouts
- Imperial Yeomanry
- Camel Corps
- Imperial Camel Corps
