= Battle of Middelfontein =

1901 battle of the Second Boer War

- Part of Second Boer War
Date	22–25 January 1901
Location	near Rustenburg, Northern Transvaal, South Africa
Result	British withdrawal to Ventersdorp

Belligerents
United Kingdom	South African Republic

Commanders and leaders
(United Kingdom) Gen. George G. Cunningham (United Kingdom) Gen. James Melville Babington	(South African Republic) Commandant Potgieter (South African Republic) Koos de la Rey

Strength
1,000+	500+

Casualties and losses
12 killed 47 wounded 3 missing	6 killed 19 wounded

The Battle of Middelfontein was a Boer War battle fought from 22 to 25 January 1901, near Rustenburg in the Northern Transvaal region. A column of British forces under General Cunningham were marching to Vlakfontein to cut off Boer forces under De la Rey when they were attacked by commandos near Middelfontein farm.

The battle was small but significant, as it was the first battle fought under the reign of the new King Edward VII.

== Background ==
By the end of 1900 and early 1901, the Boers posed a serious threat to British control in the north-western Transvaal. Battles fought at Nooitgedacht, Buffelspoort, and Hekpoort were unsuccessful at capturing the Boer Commandos, and the main British target became General De Le Rey.

On 22 January 1901, Lieutenant-General French ordered General Cunningham, who commanded the garrison in Rustenburg, to take a column of troops and march towards Vlakfontein, preventing de la Rey from moving eastwards towards Krugersdorp to attack. On the night of 22 January General Cunningham's column left Rustenburg, making its way on the road to Ventersdorp. Initially, the British advance was unhindered, but by the morning and afternoon of 23 January Boer activity, in the form of sniping, increased. Commandant Potgieter with the Wolmaranstad Commando had become aware of the British movement and had informed de la Rey, who was some 25 km away, of their presence. With the Boer opposition increasing as the column moved further south, Cunningham decided to establish a camp on a nearby farm named Middelfontein.

== Order of Battle ==
Cunningham's Column

- 7th Battalion, Imperial Yeomanry
  - 26th (Dorset) Company
  - 48th (North Somerset) Company
  - 27th (Devonshire) Company
  - 25th (West Somerset) Company
- Border Regiment
- Worcestershire Regiment
- Kitchener's Horse
- Robert's Horse
- "P" Battery, Royal Horse Artillery
- 8th Royal Field Artillery
- 6th Mounted Infantry
- 2nd Victorian Mounted Rifles

De La Rey's Force

- Wolmaransstad Commando
- Rustenburg Commando

== Battle ==
=== 23 January ===
While the British began to establish a camp at Middelfontein on the afternoon of 23 January, the Boers, who occupied high ridges in the vicinity, increased the ferocity of their skirmishing, firing rapidly into the encampment. The British quickly brought their artillery into action against the Boers and the 2nd Worcester Regiment were deployed to attack the ridge where the Boers were concentrated and after a period of sustained rifle fire from both sides, the Boers retreated.

While the initial fighting was underway, General Cunningham was able to heliograph the British position at Olifant’s Nek to report on the battle and from the garrison there he was informed of the passing of Queen Victoria and the reign of the new King Edward VII.

=== 24 January ===
That night, British pickets were posted around the camp, but Middelfontein was not an ideal defensive position as it was surrounded by hills. During the night, unbeknown to the British, de la Rey and the Rustenburg commando arrived, and together with Potgieter’s commando, the Boers surrounded the British camp. Just before dawn on 24 January the Boers overwhelmed one of the outlying pickets and heavy rifle fire from both sides followed. The British realized that they were surrounded and orders were given to reinforce the pickets. Heavy fighting continued throughout the day with the British using their artillery to good effect to keep the Boers at a significant distance from the camp. The Border Regiment discovered unoccupied Native kraals near the farm which formed an excellent defensive position looking over a break in the hills through which a Boer advance was expected, and took up a position for the attack.

General Cunningham was still, by both heliograph and lamp, in contact with Olifant’s Nek and therefore also with Pretoria. He had consequently reported his situation and had been informed that General Babbington's column from Ventersdorp, some 65 km away, was moving to his assistance. Unfortunately, he was only expected to arrive by night fall the following day. Cunningham’s fear was that other Boers in the area, such as General Beyers, would arrive before the British reinforcements.

British casualties for the day were heavy with six men killed and 36 wounded. Major Vandeleur of the Irish Guards was severely wounded and eventually died in August 1901 of the wounds he received. Lieutenant Lees of the Border Regiment was also injured. The day ended with a heavy bombardment of the hills from the British Artillery.

=== 25 January ===
When dawn broke on 25 January the British thought the Boers had withdrawn as no attack was renwed. Boer scouts had reported to de la Rey that there was a relieving force approaching from Ventersdorp, and the commandos had regrouped to avoid being attacked from the rear. Sporadic rifle fire and skirmishing from the Boers occurred but the morning passed with little action from either side.

Around midday Cunningham was made aware of Babbington’s approach and decided to break camp. When the column departed the camp, the rear guard, consisting of the 7th Battalion, Imperial Yeomanry, 'P' Battery, RHA, and the Worcester Regiment came under attack from a force of Boers. The rear guard was commanded by Lt-Col. Hackett Pain, and fought with the Boer commandos until well after dark, suffering two men killed and four wounded.

== Aftermath ==
General Babington arrived at Vlakfontein from Ventersdorp on the 25th, and General Cunningham's column finally reached the garrison the next morning. The Boers had broken off the attack on the rear guard and withdrawn from the area due to the reinforcements under Babington.

The two columns halted at Vlakfontein the next day, but the Boer snipers were busy throughout the morning, which necessitated a force of pickets to ring the area, the 7th Imperial Yeomanry and " P " Battery, RHA being posted to the defensive line.

On the following morning the camp was broken up, and the two columns separated, and on the 30th General Cunningham's force marched into Krugersdorp, only to receive orders to immediately dispatch a portion of the force to relieve a convoy which was in trouble some miles away.

== Casualties ==
In spite of the continuous fighting for three days the British casualties had not been heavy, with 12 killed, 47 wounded, and 3 missing.

=== British ===
- 2nd Battalion, Worcestershire Regiment

- killed: E.G. Cox, C. Pearson, P. Quinn, J. King (died of wounds)
- wounded: Capt. J.P.S. Maitland, Ptes. J. Braggington, J. Burton, W. Clarke, A.G. Gheel, E.V. Hankey, R. Smiles, W. Stevens, J. Taylor, W. Wiltshire
- missing: G. Gosling

- Border Regiment

- killed: S. Davis, A. Goodair, J. Wyper, A. Munro (DCM at Colenso)
- wounded: Ptes. T. Allen, W. Armstrong, W. Bartholomew, H. Boddington, T. Cain, J. Dowse, J. Edkins, F. Faulkner, C. Grainger, J. Hughes, A. Hunt, E.H.H. Lees, A.R.S. Lyon-Campbell, E. McKernon, E. Moore, W. Pass, B. Quagle, A. Roberson, J. Robinson, E. Sharnay, E. Stordy, J. Thomas, J. Wilson

- 26th (Dorset) Company, 7th Imperial Yeomanry

- wounded: Sgt-Maj. J.H. Ayles

- Robert's Horse

- killed: Pte. B.E. Schumann

=== Boers ===
Casualties were 6 killed and 19 wounded from the Wolmaransstad and Rustenburg Commandos.
