= Queen's Own Dorset Yeomanry =

British Army regiment

- Cap badge of the Queen's Own Dorset Yeomanry (c. 1914)
- Active: 1794 – 1802; 1803 – 1814; 1830 – 1967; 1997 – present
- Country: Kingdom of Great Britain (1794–1800); United Kingdom (1801–present)
- Branch: British Army
- Role: Yeomanry (Second Boer War); Yeomanry (First World War); Artillery (Second World War)
- Size: One Company (Second Boer War); Three Regiments (First World War); Two Regiments (Second World War); One Squadron (Current)
- Engagements: French Revolutionary Wars; Napoleonic Wars; Coastal Defence 1803-05; Swing Riots; Bristol Riots; Second Boer War; Battle of Doornkop; Battle of Diamond Hill; Capture of Pretoria; Battle of Nooitgedacht; Battle of Middelfontein; First World War; Gallipoli Campaign; Landing at Suvla Bay; Battle of Sari Bair; Battle of Scimitar Hill; Battle of Agagiya; Sinai and Palestine Campaign; First Battle of Gaza; Second Battle of Gaza; Third Battle of Gaza; Battle of Beersheba; Battle of Mughar Ridge; Battle of Nebi Samwil; Capture of Jerusalem; Battle of Megiddo; Capture of Damascus; Second World War; North West Europe Campaign; Operation Express; Operation Bluecoat (Mont Pinçon); Battle of Vernon Bridge; Operation Market Garden

Commanders
- Honorary Colonel: Lieutenant General Arundell D. Leakey, CMG, CVO, CBE

The Queen's Own Dorset Yeomanry was a yeomanry regiment of the British Army founded in 1794 as the Dorsetshire Regiment of Volunteer Yeomanry Cavalry in response to the growing threat of invasion during the Napoleonic Wars. It gained its first royal association in 1833 as The Princess Victoria's Regiment of Dorset Yeomanry Cavalry, and its second, in 1843, as the Queen's Own Regiment of Dorset Yeomanry Cavalry.

== History ==
=== Formation and early history ===
Under threat of invasion by the French Revolutionary government from 1793, and with insufficient military forces to repulse such an attack, the British government under William Pitt the Younger decided in 1794 to increase the Militia and to form corps of volunteers for the defence of the country. The mounted arm of the volunteers became known as the "Gentlemen and Yeomanry Cavalry".

The Dorset Yeomanry was first raised on 9 May 1794 as the Dorsetshire Regiment of Volunteer Yeomanry Cavalry of six troops. In 1796, it became the Dorsetshire Rangers and now consisted of ten troops. In 1802, it was disbanded as a result of the Treaty of Amiens and the consequent peace.

With the ending of the Peace of Amiens in 1803, the regiment was re-raised as the Dorsetshire Regiment of Volunteer Yeomanry Cavalry, consisting of seven troops. In 1814, it was once again disbanded.

=== Resurrection ===
The next, and longest lived, incarnation came in 1830 when the Dorsetshire Regiment of Volunteer Yeomanry Cavalry was reformed due to the Swing Riots. By 1838, the regiment consisted of five troops raised from the western portion of the county:

- 1st Troop (Melbury) - Capt. Charles W. Digby
- 2nd Troop (Blackmore Vale) - Capt. George T. Jacobs
- 3rd Troop (Dorchester) - Capt. Frampton
- 4th Troop (Shaftesbury) - Capt. George C. Loftus
- 5th Troop (Sherborne) - Capt. Goodden

Individual troops were raised at this time in the eastern portion of the county at Wimborne, Blandford, Isle of Purbeck, Wareham and Charborough.

The Sherborne and Blackmore Vale Troops were called out in 1831 to suppress labour riots in Sherborne, elements of the regiment supported the civil power during the Bristol Riots.

In 1833, the Dorset Yeomanry gained royal patronage from Princess Victoria, who had visited Dorset and been provided a guard of honour by the regiment. The regiment was officially restyled as The Princess Victoria's Regiment of Dorset Yeomanry Cavalry and in June 1843 became the Queen's Own Regiment of Dorset Yeomanry Cavalry. In 1840, some of the troops were called out to aid civil powers during a riot related to the Chartist movement, a remnant of the Swing Riots.

In the 1860s, it was again renamed as the Dorset Yeomanry (Queen's Own) with headquarters at Dorchester.

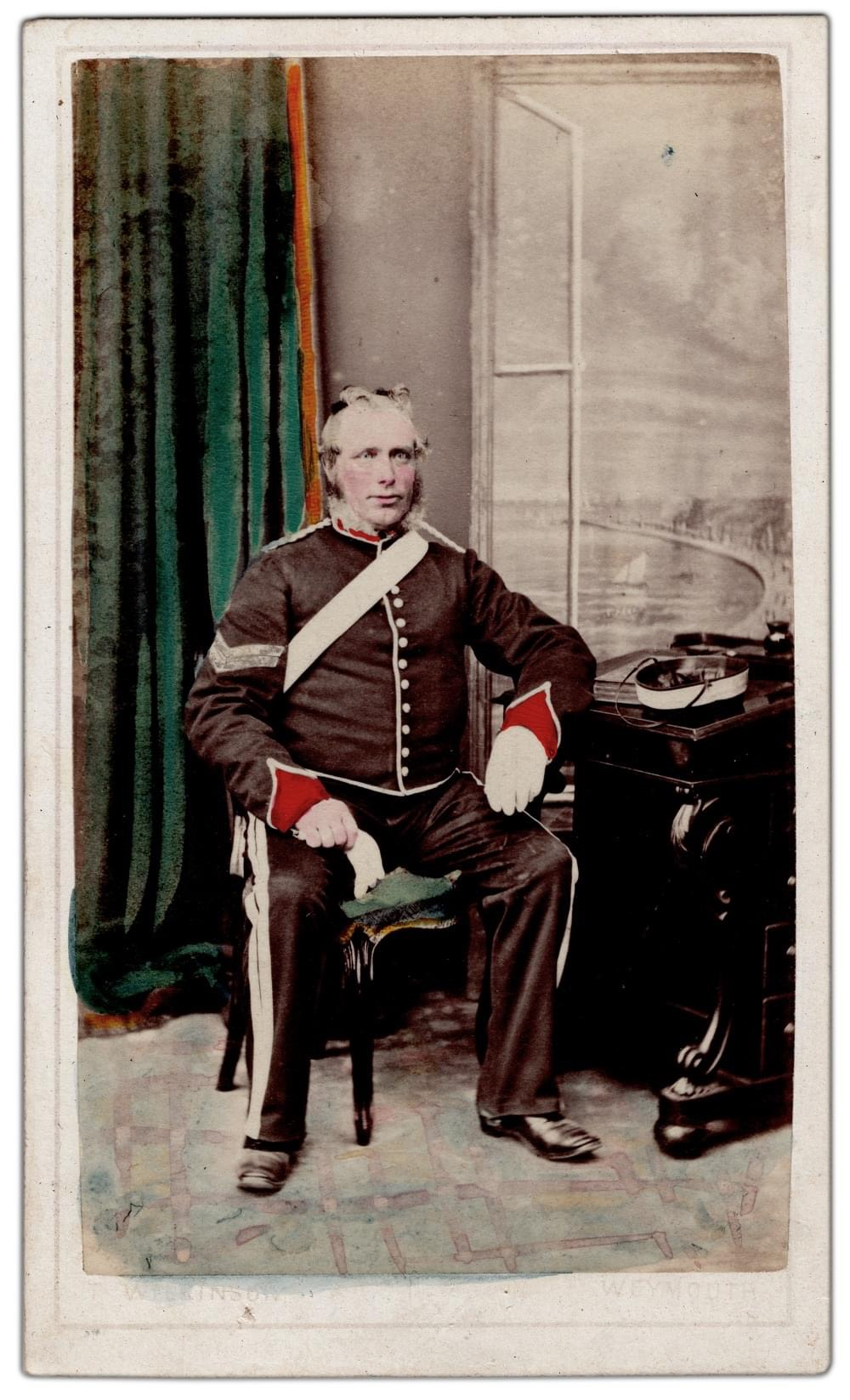
Corporal of the Dorset Yeomanry, c.1870

On 1 April 1893, the troops were reorganised into squadrons, and the headquarters moved to Weymouth.

=== Second Boer War ===
On 13 December 1899, the decision to allow volunteer forces to serve in the Second Boer War was made. Due to the string of defeats during Black Week in December, 1899, the British government realized they were going to need more troops than just the regular army, thus issuing a Royal Warrant on 24 December 1899. This warrant officially created the Imperial Yeomanry. The Royal Warrant asked standing Yeomanry regiments to provide service companies of approximately 115 men each. In addition to this, many British citizens (usually mid-upper class) volunteered to join the new regiment.

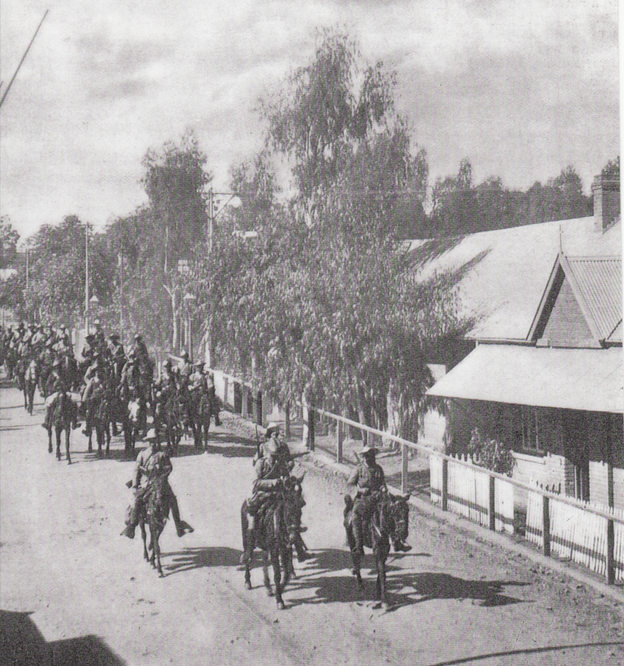
Dorset Yeomanry entering Johannesburg, 1900

The first contingent of recruits contained 550 officers, 10,371 men with 20 battalions and 4 companies, which arrived in South Africa between February and April, 1900. On arrival, the regiment was sent throughout the zone of operations. The Queen's Own Dorset Yeomanry provided troops for the 26th Company, 7th Battalion, fighting at the Relief of Wepener, Battle of Doornkop, Battle of Diamond Hill, Capture of Pretoria, Battle of Boschfontein, Battle of Nooitgedacht, and the Battle of Middelfontein along with many other patrols and skirmishes.

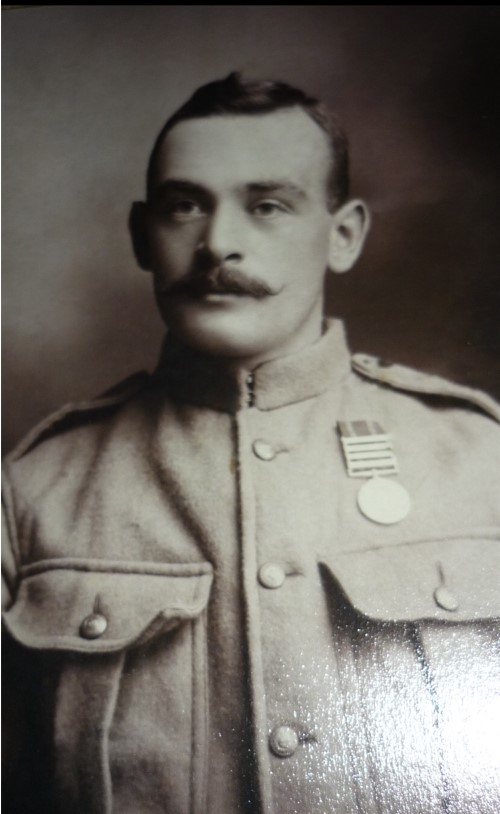
Trooper Allan Harris, Dorset Yeomanry, who fought in the Boer War from 1900 - 1901.

On 17 April 1901, the regiment was renamed as the Dorsetshire Imperial Yeomanry (Queen's Own) and reorganised in three squadrons and a machine gun section. In 1902, the headquarters moved to Sherborne. In April 1906, B Squadron was reorganized into two squadrons, with the old squadron based in Sherborne and the new, D Squadron, based in Gillingham.

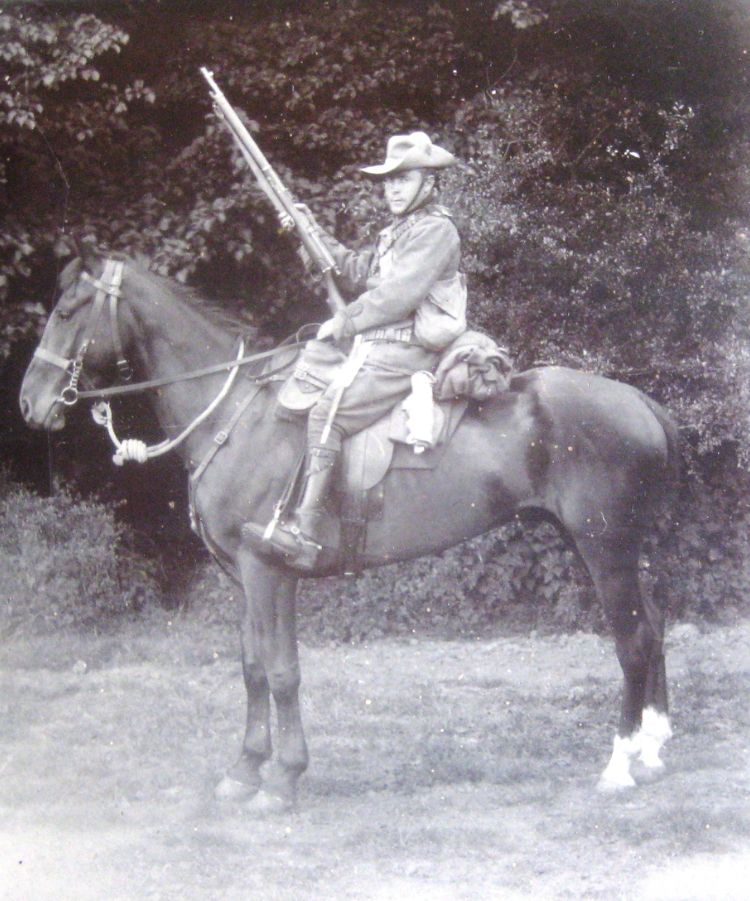
Trooper Walter Lear, Dorset Yeomanry, c.1905.

On 1 April 1908, the regiment was renamed for the final time as the Dorset Yeomanry (Queen's Own) and transferred to the Territorial Force, trained and equipped as hussars. The regiment was based at Priestlands Crescent in Sherborne at this time (since demolished).

The regiment's organisation was:

	Dorset Yeomanry (Queen's Own)
HQ	Sherborne
A Squadron	Dorchester (detachments at Bridport, Weymouth, Maiden Newton, Charmouth)
B Squadron	Sherborne (detachments at Yeovil (Somerset), Pulham)
C Squadron	Blandford (detachments at Wimborne, Wareham, Handley)
D Squadron	Gillingham (detachments at Shaftesbury, Stalbridge, Sturminster Newton)

It was ranked as 23rd (of 55) in the order of precedence of the Yeomanry Regiments in the Army List of 1914.

=== First World War ===
In accordance with the Territorial and Reserve Forces Act 1907 (7 Edw. 7, c.9), which brought the Territorial Force into being, the TF was intended to be a home defence force for service during wartime and members could not be compelled to serve outside the country. However, on the outbreak of war on 4 August 1914, many members volunteered for Imperial Service. Therefore, TF units were split in August and September 1914 into 1st Line (liable for overseas service) and 2nd Line (home service for those unable or unwilling to serve overseas) units. Later, a 3rd Line was formed to act as a reserve, providing trained replacements for the 1st and 2nd Line regiments.

==== 1/1st Queen's Own Dorset Yeomanry ====
The 1st Line regiment was mobilised in August 1914 and attached to the 1st South Western Mounted Brigade. In September 1914, It was transferred to the 2nd South Midland Mounted Brigade, 2nd Mounted Division.

In 1915, it was deployed overseas to Egypt, then onwards to participate in the Dardanelles campaign, where it served as dismounted troops and was involved in the Battle of Gallipoli, the Battle of Sari Bair and the Battle of Scimitar Hill.

After the evacuation of Gallipoli, it returned to Egypt in January 1916 and became part of the 6th Mounted Brigade, an independent brigade that was involved in the action of Agagia in February 1916. At this battle, the retreating Senussi were attacked by the Dorset Yeomanry with drawn swords across open ground. Under fire, the Yeomanry lost half their horses, and about a third of their men and officers were casualties (58 of the 184 who took part). Colonel Soutar, leading the regiment in this charge, had his horse shot from under him and was knocked unconscious. When he came to, he found himself alone amongst a group of the enemy. He drew his revolver, shot several, and took the Turkish leader Jaffir Pasha prisoner.

In February 1917, 6th Mounted Brigade joined the Imperial Mounted Division and took part in the First and Second Battles of Gaza. I, June 1917, it was transferred to the Yeomanry Mounted Division for the Third Battle of Gaza and the Battle of Beersheba.

In July 1918, the Brigade was re-designated the 10th Cavalry Brigade and the Division the 4th Cavalry Division. The Regiment remained with them in Palestine until the end of the war.

==== 2/1st Queen's Own Dorset Yeomanry ====
The 2nd Line regiment was formed at Sherborne in September 1914. In May 1915, it was at Chippenham, where it joined the 2/1st South Western Mounted Brigade, then it moved to Maresfield in September. In October 1915, it joined the 1/1st South Western Mounted Brigade (replacing the 1/1st Royal Wiltshire Yeomanry) and the brigade was redesignated as 2/1st Southern Mounted Brigade. On 31 March 1916, the remaining Mounted Brigades were ordered to be numbered in a single sequence; the brigade became the 16th Mounted Brigade and joined 4th Mounted Division at Manningtree.

In July 1916, there was a major reorganization of 2nd Line yeomanry units in the United Kingdom. All but 12 regiments were converted to cyclists and as a consequence the regiment was dismounted and joined the 7th Cyclist Brigade (and the division became 2nd Cyclist Division) at Woodbridge.

Further reorganization in November 1916 saw the 2nd Cyclist Division broken up and the regiment was remounted at Maidstone, taking over the horses of the 2/1st Queen's Own West Kent Yeomanry and replacing it in 3rd Mounted Brigade in the new 1st Mounted Division (3rd Mounted Division redesignated). In March 1917, it was at Sevenoaks.

In September 1917, the regiment was converted back to cyclists, this time in 13th Cyclist Brigade in The Cyclist Division, still at Sevenoaks. In December 1917, the 13th Cyclist Brigade was broken up and in early 1918 the regiment moved to Ireland, joining the 6th Cyclist Brigade at The Curragh. There were no further changes before the end of the war.

==== 3/1st Queen's Own Dorset Yeomanry ====
The 3rd Line regiment was formed in 1915 and in the summer was affiliated to a Reserve Cavalry Regiment at Tidworth. In July 1916, it was affiliated to the 8th Reserve Cavalry Regiment at The Curragh and in early 1917 it was absorbed into the 2nd Reserve Cavalry Regiment, also at The Curragh.

=== Between the wars ===
On 7 February 1920, the Regiment was reconstituted in the Territorial Army with HQ still at Sherborne. Following the experience of the war, it was decided that only the fourteen most senior yeomanry regiments would be retained as horsed cavalry, with the rest being transferred to other roles. As a result, on 25 January 1922, the Regiment was transferred to the Royal Artillery to form two batteries – 375 (Dorset Yeomanry) Battery at Blandford and 376 (Dorset Yeomanry) Battery (Howitzer) at Sherborne – that joined the 94th (Somerset Yeomanry) Brigade, RFA to form the 94th (Somerset and Dorset Yeomanry) Brigade, RFA, soon being renamed as the 94th (Dorset and Somerset Yeomanry) Brigade, RFA. This was a short-lived marriage, the Somerset Yeomanry batteries being moved to 55th (Wessex) Army Field Brigade, RA in July 1929.

At this time (July 1929), the regiment was renamed as the 94th (Queen's Own Dorset Yeomanry) Army Field Brigade, RA with headquarters at Dorchester. It was joined by 224 (Dorset) Battery at Dorchester, transferred from 56 (Wessex) Field Brigade, RA. Some time in the 1930s, 375 Battery moved to Shaftesbury. In February 1938, the regiment gained 218 (Bournemouth) Battery at Bournemouth, which was transferred from 95 (Hampshire) Field Brigade, RA. The final change in title came on 1 November 1938 as artillery brigades became regiments, hence 94th (Queen's Own Dorset Yeomanry) Field Regiment, RA.

In 1939, the Territorial Army was "duplicated" – existing units formed a second unit. 375 and 376 batteries were transferred to the duplicate 141st Field Regiment, RA. 94th Field Regiment, RA retained 218 and 224 batteries.

=== Second World War ===
In 1938, field regiments were organised into two 12-gun batteries. The experience of the BEF in 1940 showed the problem with this organisation: field regiments were intended to support an infantry brigade of three battalions. This could not be managed without severe disruption to the regiment. As a result, field regiments were reorganised into three 8-gun batteries.

==== 94th (Queen's Own Dorset Yeomanry) Field Regiment, RA ====
94th (Queen's Own Dorset Yeomanry) Field Regiment served in the Home Forces for most of the war, taking part in the North West Europe Campaign from June 1944.

At the outbreak of the war, 94th Field Regiment was part of 43rd (Wessex) Infantry Division. Initially commanding two batteries – 218 (Bournemouth) at Bournemouth and 224 (Dorset) Battery at Dorchester – the third battery (468) was formed in the regiment on 27 February 1941.

It remained in the United Kingdom until June 1944, when it was deployed to France, still with the 43rd (Wessex) Infantry Division. It remained with 43rd Division until the end of the war.

==== 141st (Queen's Own Dorset Yeomanry) Field Regiment, RA ====
141st (Queen's Own Dorset Yeomanry) Field Regiment served in the Home Forces throughout the war.

At the outbreak of the war, 141st Field Regiment was also part of 43rd (Wessex) Infantry Division. Initially commanding two batteries – 375 (Dorset Yeomanry) at Shaftesbury and 376 (Dorset Yeomanry) at Sherborne – the third battery (505) was formed in the regiment on 27 February 1941. It was authorised to use the "Queen's Own Dorset Yeomanry" designation from 17 February 1942.

It was transferred to the 9th Armoured Division in June 1942, 55th Infantry Division in August 1944 and finally to 61st Infantry Division in June 1945.

=== Post war ===
In 1947, the Regiment was reformed in the Territorial Army as two artillery regiments-the 294th (Queen's Own Dorset Yeomanry) Field Regiment RA and the 341st (Queen’s Own Dorset Yeomanry) Medium Regiment RA. On 1 July 1950, the two regiments were amalgamated as the 294th. In 1961, the regiment was merged with the 255th (West Somerset Yeomanry and Dorset Garrison) Medium Regiment RA, forming the 250th (Queen's Own Dorset and West Somerset Yeomanry) Medium Regiment RA – the Dorsets' title was passed to P Battery. In February 1967, the new regiment was disbanded and some of its personnel used to form two infantry companies. The final parade was held on Sunday, 26 February. The salute was taken by the Lord Lieutenant of Somerset, Lord Hylton.

==== Dorset Yeomanry ====
In 1997, an Armoured Replacement Regiment was formed at Bovington and called 'The Dorset Yeomanry'. This new regiment did not inherit the lineage and battle honours of the Queen's Own Dorset Yeomanry. In 1999, this regiment was reduced to a single squadron, which became "A" (Dorset Yeomanry) Squadron of the Royal Wessex Yeomanry. The other squadrons of this regiment are formed by other old yeomanry regiments that had been reduced to the strength of one squadron:

B (Royal Wiltshire Yeomanry) [RWY] Squadron
C (Royal Gloucestershire Hussars) [RGH] Squadron
D (Royal Devon Yeomanry) [RDY] Squadron

The Regiment has three roles:

- B, C and D Squadrons – provide replacement Challenger 2 turret crewmen to the Regular Army.
- Regimental Headquarters and A (Dorset Yeomanry) Armour Replacement Squadron – develop Armour Replacement doctrine and provide the infrastructure to support the Logistic brigades.

== Battle honours ==
The Queen's Own Dorset Yeomanry was awarded the following battle honours (honours in bold are emblazoned on the regimental colours):

Second Boer War	**South Africa 1900–01**
First World War	**Suvla**, **Scimitar Hill**, **Gallipoli 1915**, **Agagiya**, **Egypt 1915–17**, **Gaza**, **El Mughar**, **Nebi Samwil**, Megiddo, Sharon, **Damascus**, **Palestine 1917–18**
Second World War	The Royal Artillery was present in nearly all battles and would have earned most of the honours awarded to cavalry and infantry regiments. In 1833, William IV awarded the motto Ubique (meaning "everywhere") in place of all battle honours.

== Uniforms ==
During the period 1830 to 1847, the regiment wore a shako with scarlet coatee and blue facings.

After 1850, a dark blue tunic was introduced and in 1883 a hussar style uniform, complete with white looped braiding and busby, was adopted.

Following the Boer War a khaki uniform with green facings replaced the blue uniforms, to be worn with a slouch hat. The regimental cap badge was backed with green fabric trimmed in yellow. In 1906, a walking out dress was created for the other ranks when on exercise. The practical khaki dress proved unpopular for recruiting purposes however and by 1908, officers had the full dress reverted to the 19th century dark blue hussar uniform, with silver braiding, scarlet facings and plumed busby. Other ranks had plainer "blues" for parade and walking out dress. Subsequently, khaki service and battle dress of standard British Army pattern was worn for nearly all occasions.

== See also ==
- Imperial Yeomanry
- List of Yeomanry Regiments 1908
- Yeomanry
- Yeomanry order of precedence
- British yeomanry during the First World War
- Second line yeomanry regiments of the British Army
- List of British Army Yeomanry Regiments converted to Royal Artillery

== Bibliography ==
- Becke, Archibald F. (1936). Order of Battle of Divisions Part 2A. The Territorial Force Mounted Divisions and the 1st-Line Territorial Force Divisions (42–56). London: HMSO. OCLC 4405016.
- Becke, Archibald F. (1937). Order of Battle of Divisions Part 2B. The 2nd-Line Territorial Force Divisions (57th–69th) with The Home-Service Divisions (71st–73rd) and 74th and 75th Divisions. London: HMSO. OCLC 4405016.
- Bellis, Malcolm A. (1995). Regiments of the British Army 1939-1945 (Artillery). London: Military Press International. ISBN 0-85420-110-6.
- Forty, George (1998). British Army Handbook 1939-1945. Stroud, Gloucestershire: Sutton Publishing Limited. ISBN 0-7509-1403-3.
- Frederick, J.B.M. (1984). Lineage Book of British Land Forces 1660-1978. Wakefield, Yorkshire: Microform Academic Publishers. ISBN 1-85117-009-X.
- Haythornthwaite, Philip J. (1996). The World War One Source Book. London: Arms and Armour Press. ISBN 1-85409-351-7.
- James, Brigadier E.A. (1978). British Regiments 1914–18. London: Samson Books Limited. ISBN 0-906304-03-2.
- Norman E.H. Litchfield, The Territorial Artillery 19081988 (Their Lineage, Uniforms and Badges), Nottingham: Sherwood Press, 1992, ISBN 0-9508205-2-0.
- Mileham, Patrick (1994). The Yeomanry Regiments; 200 Years of Tradition. Edinburgh: Canongate Academic. ISBN 1-898410-36-4.
- Rinaldi, Richard A (2008). Order of Battle of the British Army 1914. Ravi Rikhye. ISBN 978-0-97760728-0.
- Titles and Designations of Formations and Units of the Territorial Army, London: War Office, 7 November 1927 (RA sections also summarised in Litchfield, Appendix IV).
- Westlake, Ray (1996). British Regiments at Gallipoli. Barnsley: Leo Cooper. ISBN 0-85052-511-X.
