= 1872 Transvaal presidential election =

1872	1883 →
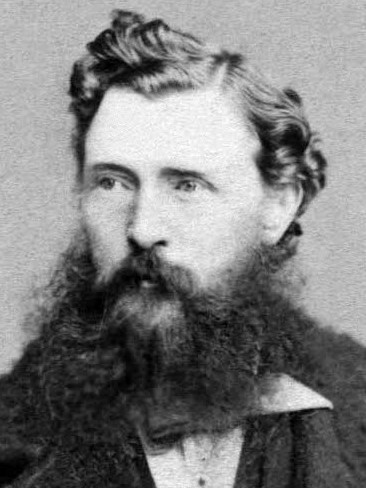

Nominee	Thomas François Burgers	William Robinson
Popular vote	2,964	388
Percentage	88.42%	11.58%
President before election
Daniel Jacobus Erasmus
(Acting)
Elected President
Thomas François Burgers

Presidential elections were held in the South African Republic in 1872. The result was a victory for Thomas François Burgers, who defeated the "Afrikanerised" Englishman William Robinson, who had been supported by Paul Kruger. Burgers was sworn in as President on 27 June.

== Results ==
Candidate	Votes	%
Thomas François Burgers	2,964	88.42
William Robinson	388	11.58
Total	3,352	100.00
Source: Debroey
