= 1893 Transvaal presidential election =

← 1888	1893	1898 →
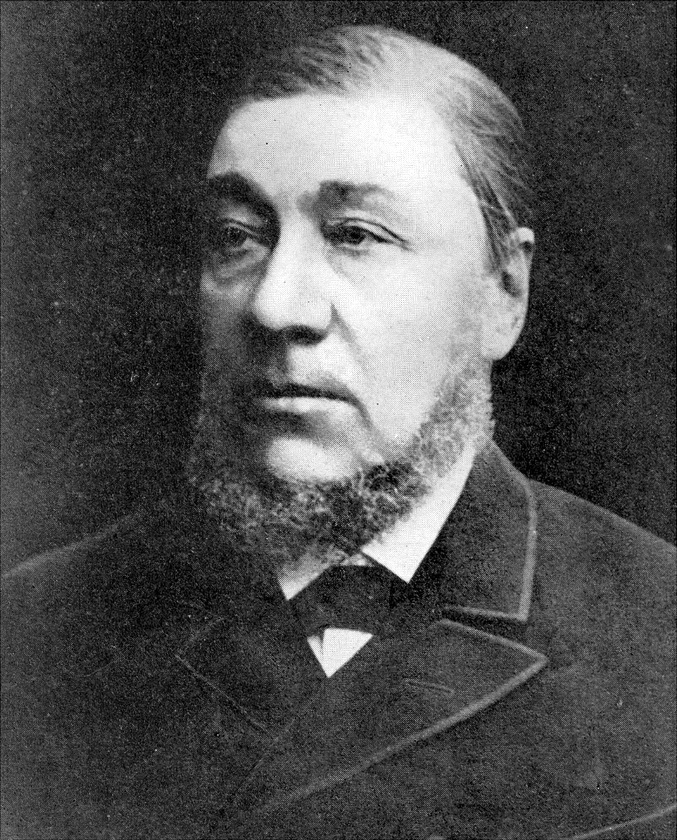

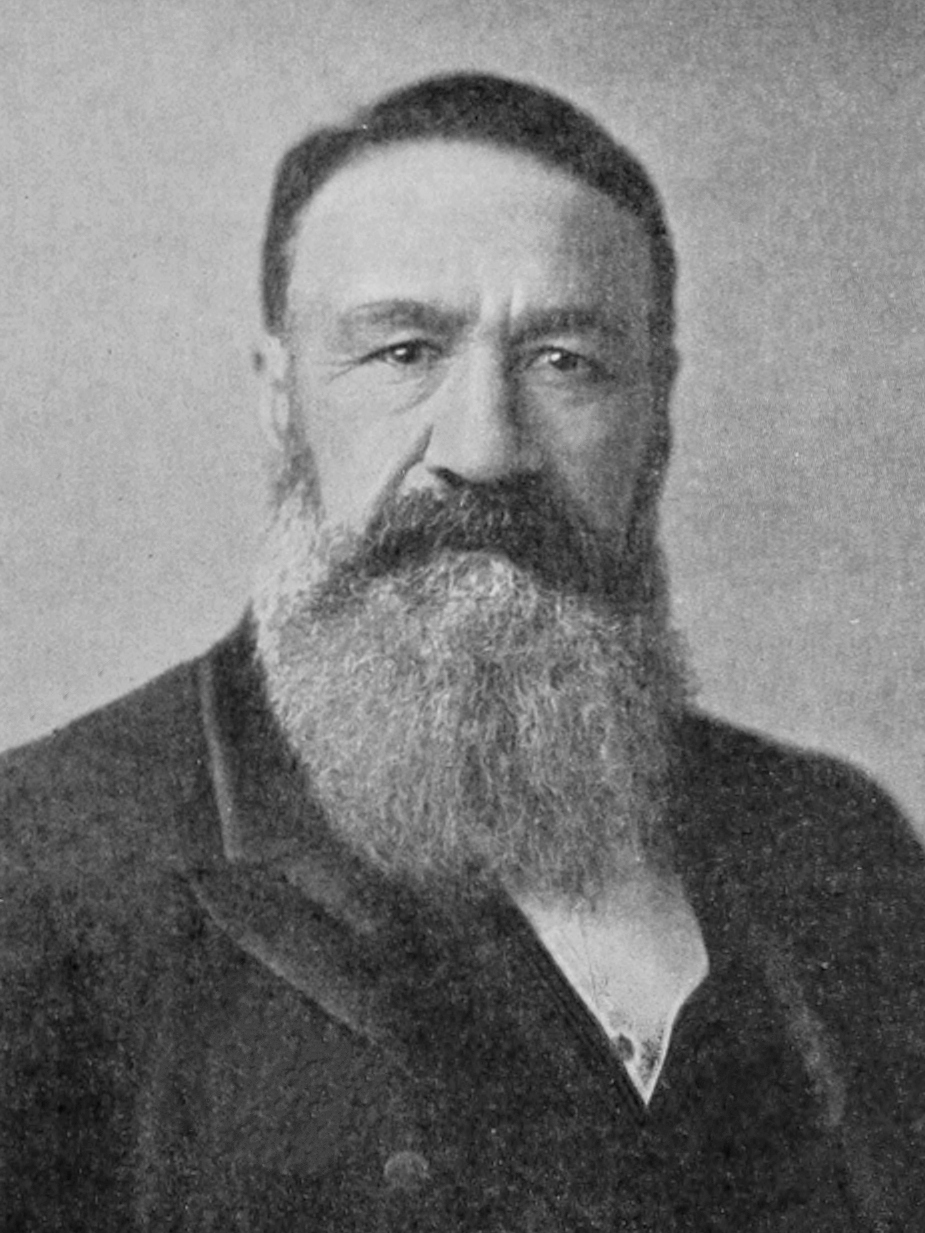
Nominee	Paul Kruger	Piet Joubert
Popular vote	7,881	7,009
Percentage	52.66%	46.83%
President before election
Paul Kruger
Elected President
Paul Kruger

Presidential elections were held in the South African Republic in 1893. The result was a victory for Paul Kruger, although there were concerns that agents of Kruger had manipulated the electoral roll.

== Results ==
Candidate	Votes	%
Paul Kruger	7,881	52.66
Piet Joubert	7,009	46.83
John Gilbert Kotzé	76	0.51
Total	14,966	100.00
Source: Annual Register
