= Fochville =

- Location within Gauteng Location within South Africa
- Coordinates: 26°29′S 27°29′E
- Country: South Africa
- Province: Gauteng
- District: West Rand
- Municipality: Merafong City

Area
  - Total: 11.36 km^{2} (4.39 sq mi)

Population (2011)
  - Total: 9,497
  - Density: 836.0/km^{2} (2,165/sq mi)

Racial makeup (2011)
  - White: 71.7%
  - Black African: 25.7%
  - Coloureds: 1.2%
  - Indian/Asian: 0.4%
  - Other: 0.9%

First languages (2011)
  - Afrikaans: 71.3%
  - English: 6.8%
  - Sotho: 6.2%
  - Tswana: 6.0%
  - Other: 9.7%
- Time zone: UTC+2 (SAST)
- Postal code (street): 2515
- PO box: 2515
- Area code: 018

Fochville is a farming and mining town located in the Gauteng province of South Africa. It is part of the Merafong City Local Municipality, which also includes Kokosi, Carletonville and Khutsong.

The area surrounding Fochville contains Sotho or Tswana ruins. Tlokwe Ruins are the remains of Sotho-Tswana settlements on the hills surrounding Fochville that were inhabited until the 1820s. Boer War hero Danie Theron was killed 5 km north of the town. The town itself was established as an agricultural centre in 1920 (the ground was officially broken by Henning Rautenbach) and was named after the World War I commander-in-chief of the Allied forces in France, Marshal of France Ferdinand Foch.

== Education ==
Fochville has five primary schools and four high schools.

== Culture ==
Sports, including cricket, rugby, karate and kickboxing are typically played at the Gert van Rensburg Stadium. The town is also home to a bird farm and a trout hatchery.

== Attack ==
In September 2012, the settlements near Fochville were subject to an ethnically motivated attack. Shacks were razed. Four people were killed and another six injured. The attack took place following a dispute over boundaries between two rival factions. The attackers used knobkierries, petrol cans and traditional spears and daggers.

== Tourist attractions ==
In early mining days, Western Deep Levels struck a stream of sulphurous water, which to this day surges out of the borehole.

Renosterfontein is a farm with old Tswana kraals, a traditional African village and the ruins of a house that belonged to the brothers of President Andries Pretorius.

The Tlokwe Ruins are the remains of Sotho-Tswana settlements on the hills surrounding Fochville. They were used until the inhabitants were driven away by Mzilikazi in the 1820s.

Monuments can be found in the area of Fochville. The Voortrekker Plaque, located to the south-west, marks the site of an early Voortrekker fortification of 1842. The Theron Memorial is a memorial to Boer scout Danie Theron, who was killed in 1900 during an engagement with Marshall's Horse.
