= 1883 Transvaal presidential election =

← 1872	16 April 1883	1888 →
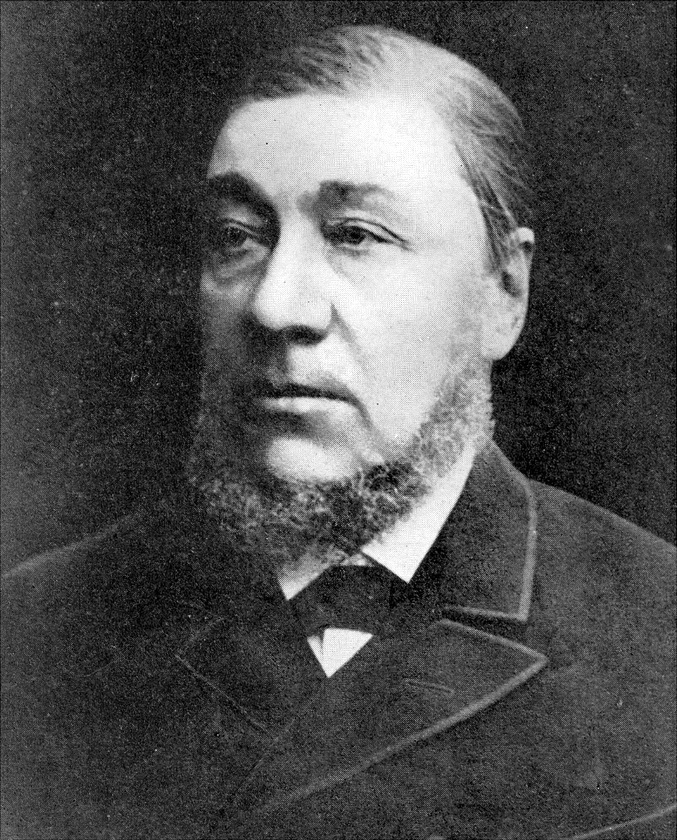

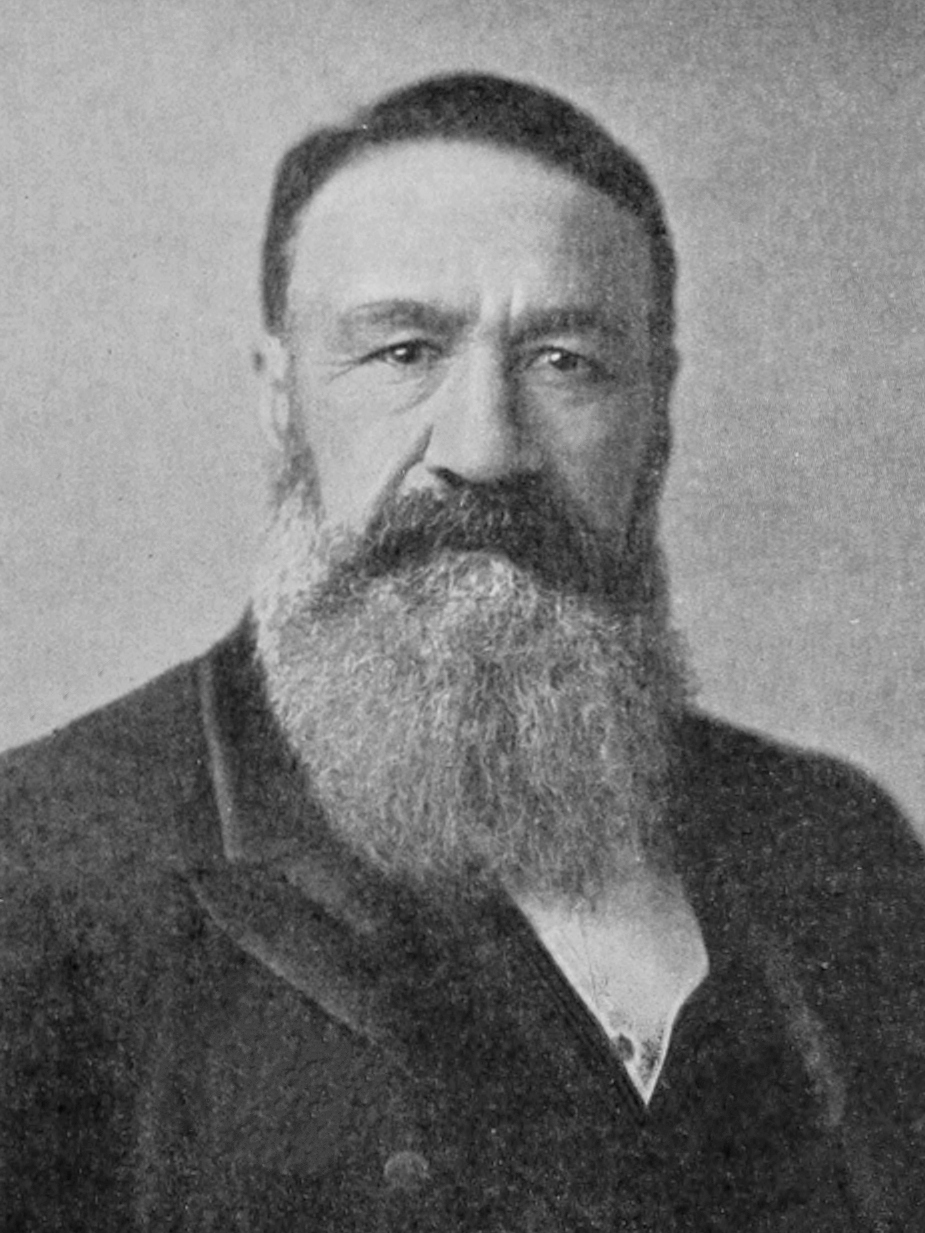
Nominee	Paul Kruger	Piet Joubert
Popular vote	3,431	1,171
Percentage	74.55%	25.45%
President before election
Triumvirate
Elected President
Paul Kruger

Presidential elections were held in the South African Republic on 16 April 1883. The election was held after the country's triumvirate leadership, consisting of Paul Kruger, Piet Joubert and Marthinus Wessel Pretorius, was abolished. The result was a victory for Kruger, who was sworn in on 9 May.

== Results ==
Candidate	Votes	%
Paul Kruger	3,431	74.55
Piet Joubert	1,171	25.45
Total	4,602	100.00
Source: Encyclopædia Britannica
