= Battle of Willow Grange =

Skirmish of the Second Boer War on November 23, 1899

Coordinates: 29°06′15.5″S 29°55′39.0″E

- Part of the Second Boer War
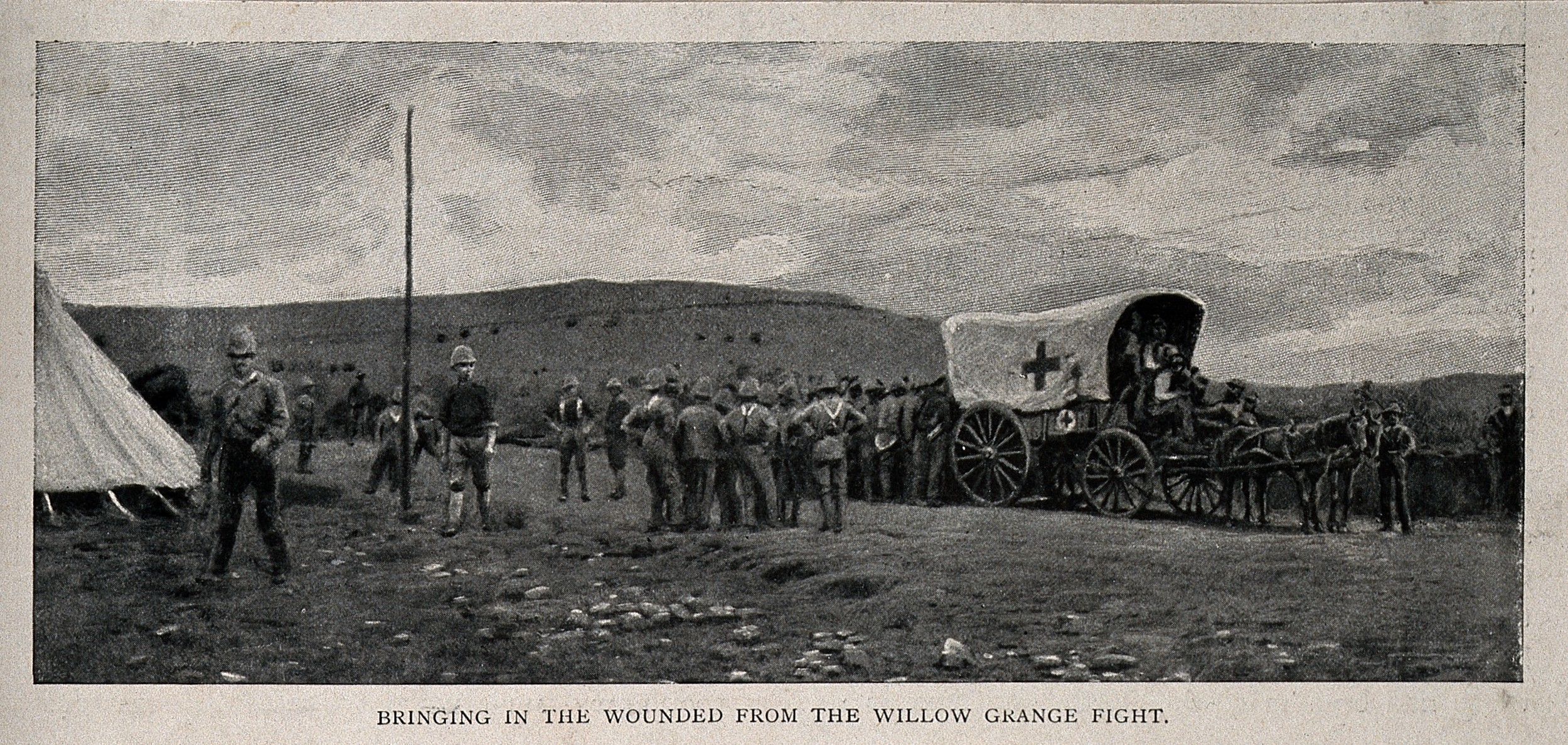
- Hospital Wagon bringing in the wounded from the fight
Date	23 November 1899
Location	Willow Grange, Natal
Result	Boer Victory

Belligerents
United Kingdom	South African Republic (Transvaal)

Commanders and leaders
(United Kingdom of Great Britain and Ireland) Walter Kitchener	(South African Republic) Piet Joubert

Strength
3,000	2,000

Casualties and losses
115 killed, 49 wounded	2 killed, 2 wounded

The Battle of Willow Grange, which took place on 23 November 1899 at Willow Grange, south of Estcourt, saw the Boer forces under General Piet Joubert defeat the British forces. The battle was fought in adverse weather conditions; lightning struck, killing one civilian and knocking two others unconscious, and also killed six horses. Additionally, one British soldier was struck by lightning. This was the furthers Boer advance in the war, and afterwards, General Joubert would retreat, as reinforcements led by General Buller had arrived in Mooi River.

== Background ==
The Boers had been advancing from Ladysmith since 1 November, and on 3 November, took the town of Colenso. From there, they continued to advance south, and split their forces into two, one heading towards Frere, and the other heading towards Weenen. At this point, the Natal Field Force was split into two, with the main body of troops besieged at Ladysmith, and a force of around 2,000 stationed at Estcourt, waiting for reinforcement from General Buller. On 15 November, the Boers ambushed a British armored train, resulting in the capture of Winston Churchill. From there, they continued to advance south, bypassing Estcourt, and stationing themselves on the hills overlooking the railway line at Willow Grange. By 21 November, the British had seen the Boer position, and began preparations to dislodge them.

== Battle ==
On 22 November, the British moved out from Estcourt under the command of Col. Walter Kitchener. They marched to the Boer position, and waited to attack at night. At midnight on 23 November, the British began their attack, however a lighting storm started, making the conditions adverse for both sides.

== Casualties ==
The British forces lost 115 soldiers, with 49 wounded, while the Boer forces had two soldiers killed and two wounded.
