= Tlokwe Ruins =

Historic site in South Africa

- Location within Gauteng
- 26°29′S 27°29′E
- Nearest city: Fochville

The Tlokwe Ruins are the remains of Sotho-Tswana settlements on the hills surrounding Fochville in Gauteng, South Africa. They were inhabited until the inhabitants were driven away by Mzilikazi in the 1820s.

The Sotho-Tswana people lived in this area for roughly 300 years before the 1815-1840 Difaqane and the 1815-1816 volcanic winter. They farmed sorghum, maize and cattle in the fertile valleys and had a thriving community. During the Difaqane they accepted refugees from the south and eventually, caving in to both population and environmental pressures, moved toward the Brits area.
