= 1888 Transvaal presidential election =

← 1883	1888	1893 →
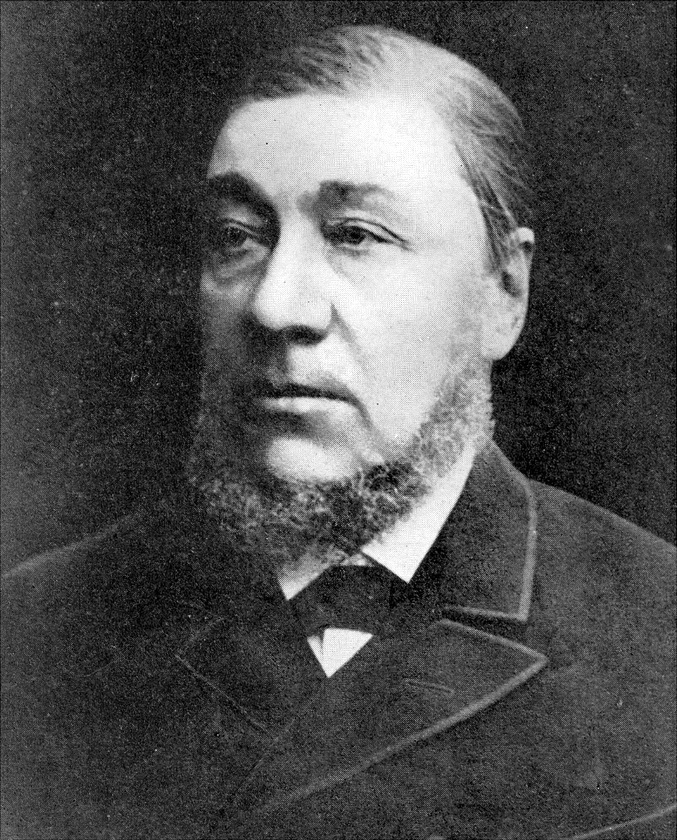

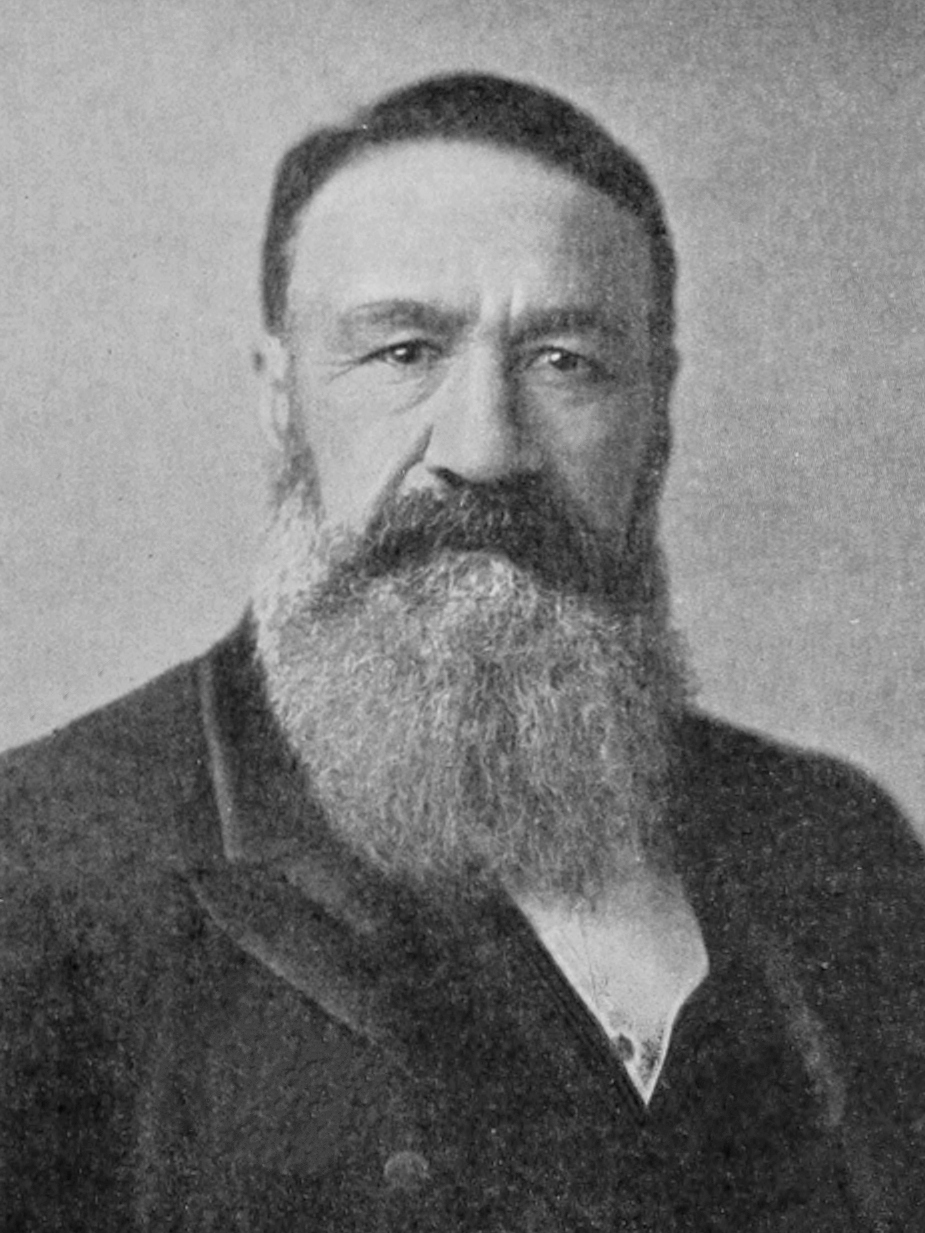
Nominee	Paul Kruger	Piet Joubert
Popular vote	4,483	834
Percentage	84.31%	15.69%
President before election
Paul Kruger
Elected President
Paul Kruger

Presidential elections were held in the South African Republic in 1888. The result was a victory for Paul Kruger, who defeated Piet Joubert by a wide margin.

== Results ==
Candidate	Votes	%
Paul Kruger	4,483	84.31
Piet Joubert	834	15.69
Total	5,317	100.00
Source: De Souza
