= Piet Joubert =

Boer politician and general (1834–1900)

Petrus Jacobus Joubert
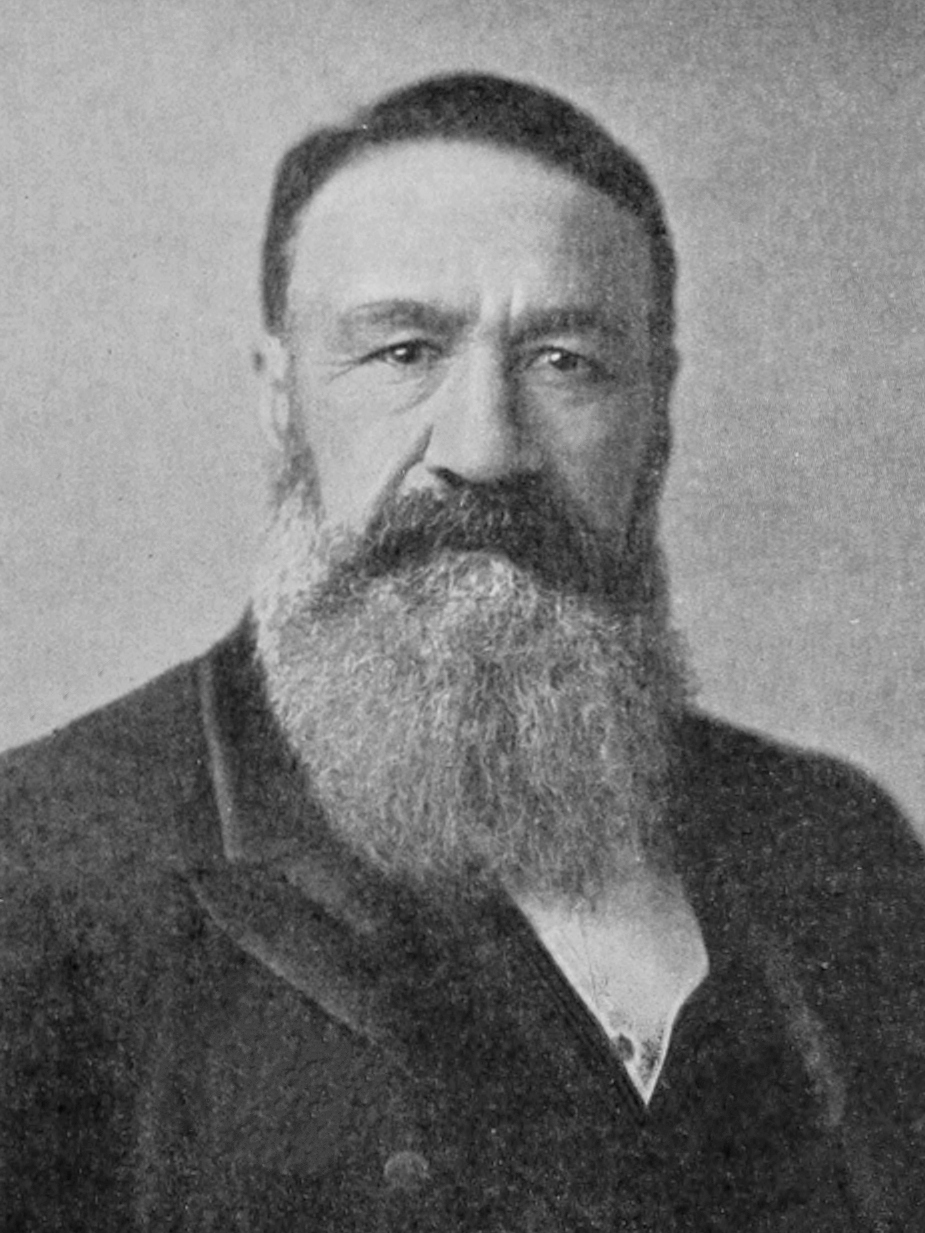
- Commandant General P. J. Joubert

Member of the Triumvirate
- In office 8 August 1881 – 9 May 1883 Serving with M.W. Pretorius and Paul Kruger
- Preceded by: The Viscount Wolseley aAs Governor of the Transvaal)
- Succeeded by: Paul Kruger (as President of the South African Republic)

Member of the Volksraad
- Constituency: Wakkerstroom

Personal details
- Born: Petrus Jacobus Joubert; 20 January 1831 Farm Cango, Oudtshoorn, British Cape Colony
- Died: 28 March 1900 (aged 69) Pretoria, South African Republic
- Cause of death: Peritonitis
- Occupation: Soldier, politician

Military service
- Allegiance: South African Republic
- Rank: Commandant-general
- Battles/wars: First Boer War; Battle of Laing's Nek; Battle of Schuinshoogte; Battle of Majuba Hill; Malaboch War; Second Boer War; Battle of Ladysmith; Northern Natal Offensive; Battle of Willow Grange; Siege of Ladysmith

Petrus Jacobus Joubert (20 January 1831 – 28 March 1900), better known as Piet Joubert, was a South African politician who served as the commandant–general of the South African Republic from 1880 to 1900. He also served as Vice-President to Paul Kruger from May 1883 to October 1884 and from May 1896 until his death. He served in First Boer War, Second Boer War, and the Malaboch War.

== Early life ==
Petrus Jacobus Joubert was born in the district of Prince Albert, British Cape Colony, a descendant of a French Huguenot who fled to South Africa soon after the revocation of the Edict of Nantes by Louis XIV. Left an orphan at an early age, Joubert migrated to the Transvaal, where he settled in the Wakkerstroom district near Laing's Nek and the north-east corner of the Colony of Natal. There he not only farmed with great success, but turned his attention to the study of the law.

== Political career ==
The esteem in which his shrewdness in both farming and legal affairs was held led to his election to the Volksraad as member for Wakkerstroom early in the sixties, Marthinus Pretorius being then in his second term of office as president. In 1870 Joubert was again elected, and the use to which he put his slender stock of legal knowledge secured him the appointment of attorney-general of the republic. In 1875 he acted as president during the absence of T. F. Burgers in Europe. He served as the Chairman of Volksraad from 1873 on.

== First Boer War ==
During the first British annexation of the Transvaal, Joubert earned for himself the reputation of a consistent irreconcilable by refusing to hold office under the government, as Paul Kruger and other prominent Boers were doing. Instead of accepting the lucrative post offered him, he took a leading part in creating and directing the agitation which led to the First Boer War (1880–1881), eventually becoming, as commandant-general of the Boer forces, a member of the triumvirate that administered the provisional Boer government set up in December 1880 at Heidelberg.

He was in command of the Boer forces at Laings Nek, Ingogo, and Majuba Hill, subsequently conducting the earlier peace negotiations that led to the conclusion of the Pretoria Convention.

== Later political career ==
In 1883 he was a candidate in the Transvaal presidential election, but received only 1,171 votes as against 3,431 cast for Kruger. After losing to Kruger again in the 1888 elections, he ran against Kruger for a third time in the 1893 elections, standing as the representative of the comparatively progressive section of the Boers, who wished in some measure to redress the grievances of the Uitlander population which had grown up on the Rand. The poll (though there is good reason for believing that the voting lists had been manipulated by Kruger's agents) was declared to have resulted in 7911 votes being cast for Kruger and 7246 for Joubert. After a protest Joubert acquiesced to Kruger's continued presidency.

He stood again in 1898, but the Jameson raid had occurred meantime and the voting was 12,858 for Kruger and 2,001 for Joubert. Joubert's position had then become much weakened by accusations of treachery and of sympathy with the Uitlander agitation. He was a South African Freemason.

He was elected twice as the Vice President, first time in May 1883. However, he resigned in October 1884 due to differences with Paul Kruger with respect to the policy in British Bechuanaland. Joubert was elected second time as Vice President after the death of Nicolaas Smit in May 1896 and he served until his own death on 28 March 1900.

== Second Boer War ==
He took little part in the negotiations that culminated in the ultimatum sent to the UK by Kruger in 1899, and though he immediately assumed nominal command of the operations on the outbreak of hostilities, he gave up to others the chief share in the direction of the war, through his inability or neglect to impose upon them his own will. His cautious nature, which had in early life gained him the sobriquet of Slim Piet (Clever Piet), joined to a lack of determination and assertiveness that characterized his whole career, led him to act mainly on the defensive; and the strategically offensive movements of the Boer forces, such as Elandslaagte and Willow Grange, appear to have been neither planned nor executed by him.

Deneys Reitz found Joubert to be "unequal to the burden" of command, citing amongst other incidents how he declined to exploit the British retreat at the Battle of Lombard's Kop during the siege of Ladysmith. According to Reitz, Joubert quoted an old Dutch saying: "When God holds out a finger, don't take the whole hand".

== Death ==
On 28 November 1899, during a raid south of the Tugela river in Natal, Joubert was thrown from his horse and suffered internal injuries. As the war went on, physical weakness led to Joubert's virtual retirement, and, though two days earlier he was still reported as being in supreme command, he died at Pretoria from peritonitis on 28 March 1900. Sir George White, the defender of Ladysmith, summed up Jouberts character when he called him "a soldier and a gentleman, and a brave and honourable opponent".

== Honours ==
The town of Pietersburg (now named Polokwane) in the northern region of the then Transvaal Republic (current Limpopo province) was named after Piet Joubert. Rudyard Kipling wrote a poem upon his death, Piet Joubert, wherein he absolved him from complicity in instigating the war, and held his colleagues to account (excerpt):

With those that bred, with those that loosed the strife,
He had no part whose hands were clear of gain;
But subtle, strong, and stubborn, gave his life
To a lost cause, and knew the gift was vain.

== See also ==
- Fritz Joubert Duquesne
