= Dimachae =

Dimachae (Ancient Greek: διμάχαι, from δίς dis, "two, double, twice" and μάχη mache "fight") were Macedonian horse-soldiers, who also fought on foot when occasion required, similar to Mounted infantry like Dragoons in modern times. Their armour was heavier than that of the ordinary horse-soldier, and lighter than that of the regular heavy-armed foot-soldier. A servant accompanied each soldier in order to take care of his horse when he alighted to fight on foot. This species of troops is said to have been first introduced by Alexander the Great. The Celtiberians fielded a similar unit.
