= Daniel Jacobus Erasmus =

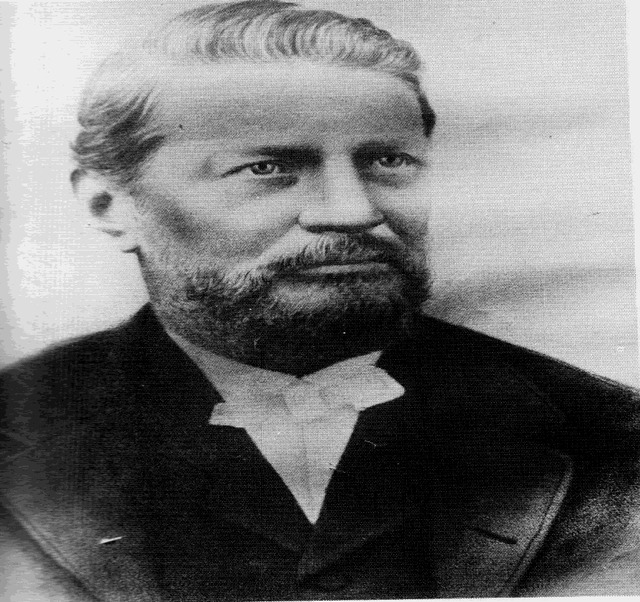
- Acting State President DJ Erasmus

President of the Executive Council of the South African Republic
- In office 22 November 1871 – 1 July 1872
- Preceded by: Marthinus Wessel Pretorius
- Succeeded by: Thomas François Burgers

Personal details
- Born: Daniel Jacobus Erasmus; 5 April 1830 Somerset East, Cape Colony
- Died: 30 April 1913 (aged 83) Bethal, South African Republic

Military service
- Allegiance: South African Republic

Daniel Jacobus Erasmus (nickname 'van Straten'/'van Straat', Somerset East, Cape Colony, 1830 - Bethal District, Transvaal, 1913) was a South African Boer commander and politician. He was a member of the Transvaal Volksraad and served as the acting president of Transvaal between 1871 and 1872. His plan to unite the South African Republic and the Orange Free State failed. In the Second Boer War (1899 - 1902) he was one of the commanders in charge of the defense of Pretoria.

== Family history ==
The history of the Erasmus family in South Africa began when Pieter Erasmus arrived in Cape Town in ca. 1691. He settled into a farm called "De Groenenbergh", located in Drakenstein. Pieter married Maria Elisabeth Jooste in ca. 1697. The couple had eight or nine children. Pieter roamed a great deal to look for cultivable land, a trait that his descendant, Daniel Jacobus Erasmus (not the same person who acted as State President), inherited. It was Daniel Jacobus Erasmus and his family who were among the first to occupy the land that in time became modern-day Pretoria.

In 1841, the 56-year-old Daniel "Swartkoppies" Jacobus Erasmus arrived with his family in the area that is now Centurion, South Africa. The area in Centurion including the Midvaal area was originally occupied by the Mogale clan and still has an active land claim over it. This land was seized and they were forcibly removed. A later retelling of history says they sold the land. Like his ancestor Pieter, Daniel moved into a farm, which he named Zwartkop/Swartkoppies after his nickname. But unlike his pioneering ancestor Daniel didn't find the farm site on his own. The place was recommended to him by his eldest son Daniel Elardus Erasmus. Elardus had happened into the area during an elephant hunt in 1831. He had found the area congenial for farming: there were great grazing grounds, pristine rivers and the absence of malaria. Taking his son's advice, Daniel acquired a large piece of land and settled down. Daniel Elardus Erasmus settled on the farm Doornpoort in the area that is now known as Irene and other members of the family acquired other farms around the Pretoria area.

== Young years ==
'van Straat' Erasmus was born on April 5, 1830 in the later Bedford, South Africa district in the Eastern Cape to Lourens Johannes Erasmus (born January 16, 1800) and Johanna Elisabeth van Straten (born January 3, 1807) who were Voortrekkers and fought the Zulus in Natal. Lourens Erasmus moved from Natal to eastern Transvaal before 1842 to settle on the Steelpoort River and was Volksraad member and field cornet for Ohrigstad. He then moved to the upper part of the Elands River near the later Premier Mine.

== Career ==
His son Daniel Jacobus Erasmus fought for the government in the Transvaal civil war (1862-1864) against Stephanus Schoeman. The Transvaal Volksraad elected Daniel Erasmus to its executive council on June 21, 1870. After the Keate Award in October 1871 (the British seizure of the Kimberley diamond fields by Robert W. Keate, then Lieutenant-Governor of the British Colony of Natal), Transvaal president Marthinus Wessel Pretorius resigned and the Volksraad chose Erasmus as acting state president on November 21, 1871.

=== Acting President 1871-1872 ===
As president Erasmus protested against the Keate Award and the southwestern boundaries, sent a commission under Piet Joubert to settle relations with the Swazi people, and introduced obligatory printed passes for Bantu individuals wishing to leave the Transvaal. He proposed treaties of trade and friendship with the new German emperor William I and with Orange Free State, drafted with its president Johannes Brand, and also a secret offensive and defensive alliance with the Orange Free State. Only the trade and friendship treaty with the Orange Free State was ratified by both states in May and August 1871. However, Erasmus' plan to unite the South African Republic and the Orange Free State failed. Brand was invited to accept the candidature for the Transvaal presidency by a delegation presenting 2,886 Transvaal signatures in support. But Brand declined and proposed Reverend Thomas François Burgers of Hanover instead who was duly elected, in spite of the opposition by Erasmus and Paul Kruger. Erasmus stayed on the Transvaal executive council but resigned soon after Burgers assumed office on July 1, 1872.

=== Middelburg ===
In 1883 he was commander of the Middelburg Commando in the war against the native Mapog (father of Nyabêla), and represented Middelburg in the Transvaal Volksraad from 1884 to 1886. He was a member of the commission establishing the boundary between the Transvaal and Portuguese East Africa. In the Second Boer War (1899 - 1902) he was one of the commanders in charge of the defense of Pretoria.

== Private life ==
Erasmus married twice, first to Margaretha Maria Steenkamp (died 1874) and later to Hebra (Helena) Margaretha Smuts, who together gave him some eight children. The eldest son, Louw Erasmus, was killed during the Second Boer War in the Battle of Bakenlaagte on October 30, 1901.
