= Malaboch War =

Brief African war between Boers and Bahananwa

Date	April 1894 - July 1894
Location	Blouberg, South Africa 23°05′0″S 28°51′0″E
Result	South African Republic (ZAR) Victory

Belligerents
South African Republic	Bahananwa (Xananwa)

Commanders and leaders
(South African Republic) Commandant-General Piet Joubert (South African Republic) Commando Danie Theron	Chief Malaboch

Strength
1,760 (about 2,400 in total)	~1,000

Casualties and losses
Unknown	Unknown
- Location within South Africa

The Malaboch War (Afrikaans: Malaboch Oorlog) (1894) was between Chief Malaboch (Mmaleboho, Mmaleboxo) of the Hananwa people and the South African Republic (ZAR) Government led by Commandant-General Piet Joubert. Malboch refused to pay taxes to the Transvaal after it was given back to the Boers in 1881 by the British, which resulted in a military drive against him by the South African Republic (ZAR).

== Background ==
The Malaboch war broke out when Chief Malaboch refused to leave his kingdom in Blouberg after being asked to leave by the government of South African Republic in April 1894. Piet Joubert led the Transvaal forces to an overwhelming victory leading to the surrender of the Bahananwa.
