= Daniel Theron =

Boer military officer and lawyer (1872–1900)

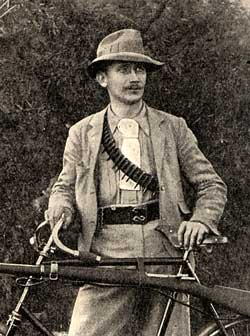
- Theron as commandant of the Wielrijders Rapportgangers Corps, 1899
- Born: 9 May 1872; Tulbagh, Cape Colony
- Died: 5 September 1900 (aged 28); Gatsrand, South African Republic
- Military career
- Allegiance: Transvaal
- Service years: 1894 – 1900
- Rank: Captain
- Nickname: Danie
- Units: Wielrijders Rapportgangers Corps; Theron Reconnaissance Corps
- Conflicts: Malaboch War; Second Boer War †; Battle of Paardeberg; Battle of Spion Kop

Captain Daniël Johannes Stephanus Theron (9 May 1872 – 5 September 1900) was a South African Boer military officer, teacher and lawyer best known for his service during the Second Boer War. Born in Tulbagh, Cape Colony, he was raised in Bethlehem, South African Republic. Originally intending on becoming a schoolteacher, Theron instead became a lawyer and notary with his own law firm in Krugersdorp. After the outbreak of the Second Boer War in 1899, he joined the Boer commandos where he was responsible for the formation of a bicycle infantry formation.

During the conflict, Theron was placed in command of Theron's Reconnaissance Corps (TVK), a reconnaissance unit named after him. He fought at the battles of Paardeberg and Spion Kop, where in response to his actions British commander Frederick Roberts, 1st Earl Roberts described Theron as "the hardest thorn in the flesh of the British advance" and placed a bounty of on his head. In 1900, Theron was killed in action in a skirmish against men of Marshall's Horse.

== Early life ==
Theron was the ninth of fifteen children of Charlise Helena Margaretha (née Krige) and Willem Wouter Theron, of French Huguenot ancestry. He began his career as a school teacher but later earned a law degree and started his own practice. Before the Second Anglo-Boer War, Theron was a commando in the 1894 Malaboch War, and he trained scouts for reconnaissance until 1899. By his contemporaries, Theron was said to be slight, wiry, with a dark complexion, and short-tempered. He was a South African Freemason.

== Second Anglo-Boer War ==
Theron became a Boer commandant and was put in charge of organizing and leading the Boer reconnaissance scouts, the Therons Verkenningskorps (TVK) (Theron's Reconnaissance Corps). To save horses for combat, he developed the use of bicycles for despatch and reconnaissance. His 105 recruits were equipped with various items including revolvers, binoculars and sometimes light carbines. The TVK would watch British movements and study their tactics during battles.

Reconnaissance missions became Theron's speciality. He was able to move through terrain without being detected. As the war progressed, Theron and his men were moved closer to the Western front. Boer forces, under the command of Piet Cronje, were constantly skirmishing with British forces, and the TVK gained a reputation for destroying railway bridges. Lord Roberts labelled Theron "the chief thorn in the side of the British". A bounty was put on his head with £1,000 offered for his capture.

Theron's most notable single action was at the Battle of Paardeberg where, on 25 February 1900, Gen. Piet Cronje and several thousand troops were surrounded by British forces. Outnumbered and losing the battle, Theron, acting as a messenger for the other primary Boer commander, snuck through British lines to convey a plan for a breakout operation - and then snuck back through the lines to deliver Cronje's reply. The TVK brought many Boer civilians and soldiers across the river safely into Boer territory, but in spite of Theron's efforts the planned operation failed and most of the Boer forces surrendered.

He was, without doubt, one of the finest scouts the Boer nation produced. He repeatedly entered our lines and obtained most valuable information. Again and again he cut off our scouts and patrols, raided our stock, and did all manner of splendid military service for his people.

— Frederick Russell Burnham, Chief of Scouts for the British Army in the Second Boer War (1900).

After the British occupied parts of the Orange Free State in March 1900, Theron and the TVK became well known for the guerrilla campaign they conducted against the Imperial forces. The TVK attacked trains and railyards, ambushed and captured British soldiers and officers, blew up bridges, and freed captured Boer fighters from British prisons. On two occasions, while scouting in the veld in no-man's land, Theron came upon the British Army Chief of Scouts, the American Frederick Russell Burnham. Both times the two men exchanged fire, but only at a distance.

In July 1900, the British dispatched a force of 4,000 troops to find and eliminate the TVK. After one skirmish with this force on 19 July, Theron managed to evade his pursuers and continue raiding, but the TVK was always on the run.

=== Death ===
While scouting alone on a koppie at Gatsrand, about 6 kilometres (3.7 mi) north of present-day Fochville, he encountered seven members of Marshall's Horse and was killed in action. According to the source, Daniel almost ran into the cavalry platoon, but he reacted and opened fire so swiftly that he nearly eliminated the entire squad of seven, killing three and maiming four. However, his gunfire drew attention to the escorting artillery, and the field guns opened a barrage on the koppie that killed him. General de Wet remarked "Men as lovable or as valiant there might be, but where shall I find a man who combined so many virtues and good qualities in one person?"

On 15 September 1900, the men of the TVK exhumed the body of their Commandant and reburied him in the family cemetery of the Pienaar family near Fochville. On 10 March 1903, Theron's last will was carried out and his body was once again exhumed to be reburied next to that of his late fiancée Hannie Neethling on her father's farm Eikenhof on the Klip (Rock) River.

== Legacy ==
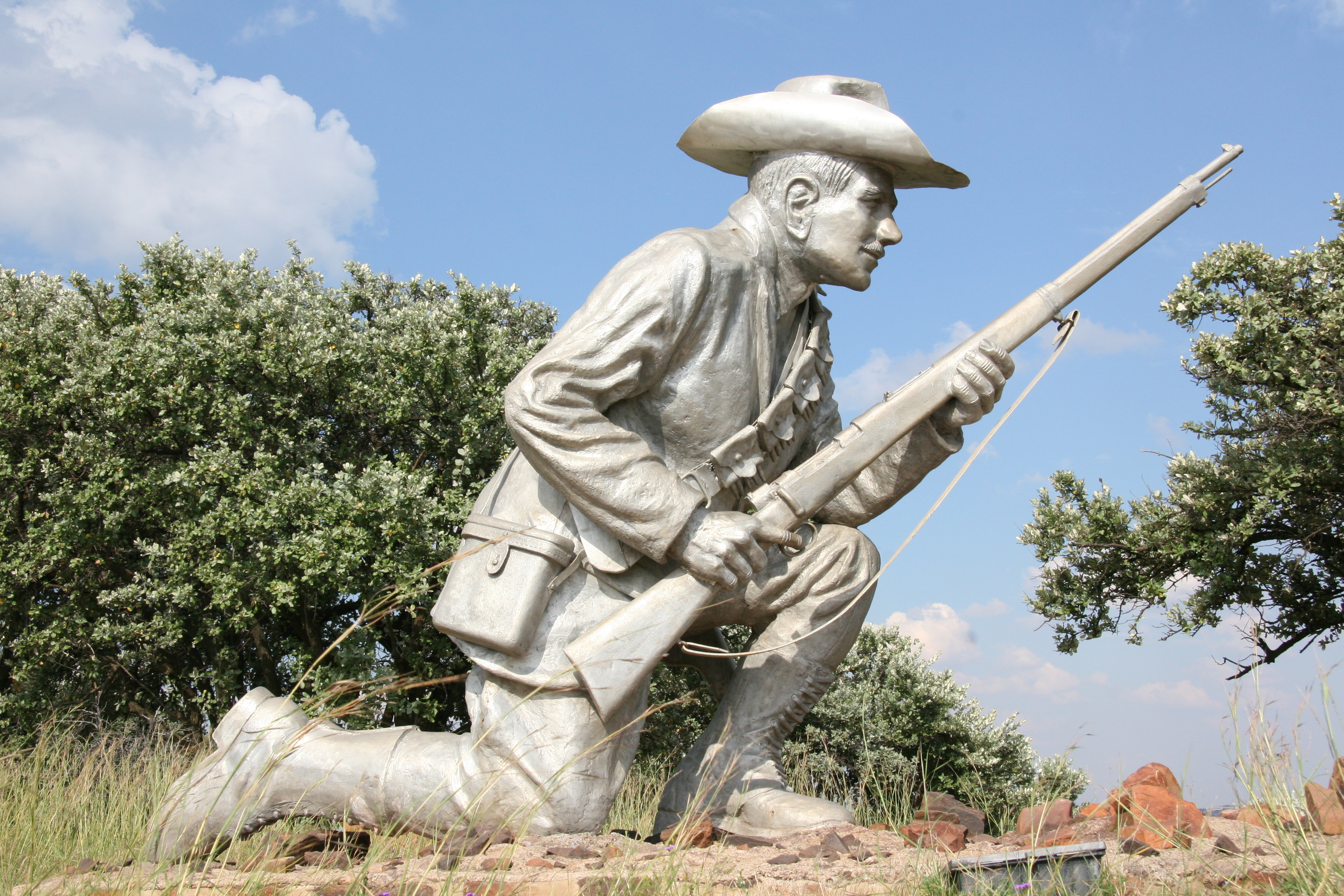
Refurbished statue of Daniel Theron at Fort Schanskop, Pretoria, South Africa

On 28 December 1907, Generals Louis Botha and Jan Smuts unveiled the Danie Theron Monument near Potchefstroom.

On 9 September 1950, a monument was unveiled at the location where Danie Theron died (near the N12 road between Johannesburg, South Africa and Potchefstroom). The monument has the following symbolism:

- the main body consists of 50 concrete rings, which represents the 50 years since September 1900 when Danie Theron died; and
- a copper flame at the top of the structure represents the flame which burned in the hearts of Theron and his nation, in search of their freedom and independence.

The monument was built by L. Fokkens (Pty) Ltd. according to plans of the architect Mr. Hillebrands (from Krugersdorp). Funds for the monument were collected by the Voortrekkers organisation.

A new Danie Theron Monument was erected near the Union Building in Pretoria, South Africa on 6 March 2002, by the former South African President Nelson Mandela. On one of the very rare occasions where Mr. Mandela spoke Afrikaans in public, he said he valued the fighting spirit of Danie Theron, his honesty, bravery and his determination to do the right thing for his nation and his beliefs. Mr. Mandela said that the modern South Africa needs more Danie Therons in order to meet the challenges that lie ahead.

One of the primary schools in Carletonville was named in honour of this Boer hero, i.e. Laer Gedenkskool Danie Theron. A smaller replica of the monument (found on the hill near Fochville) was also erected on the school grounds, near the main entrance.

A Commando Combat School was established at Kimberley, South Africa on 1 November 1967 and in 1968 it was renamed the Danie Theron Combat School. South Africa's school of military intelligence is also named after Danie Theron.

The Danie Theron Medal was instituted by South Africa in 1970. It is awarded for diligent service in the Territorial Reserve (officers only until 1975). The ribbon is green with 3 yellow stripes.

His great-great-niece, Charlize Theron, is an Academy Award-winning actress.
