= 1898 Transvaal presidential election =

- 3 January–4 February 1898
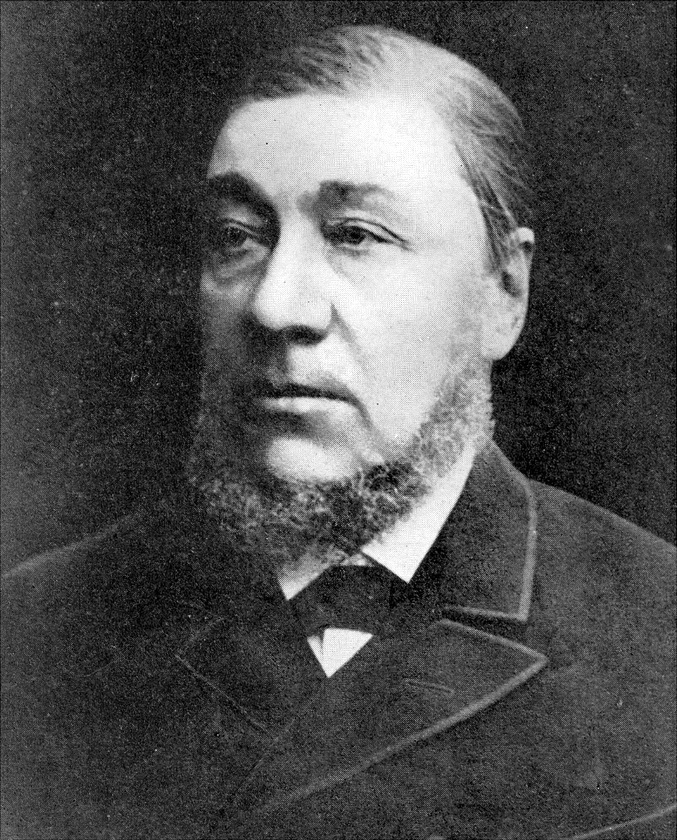

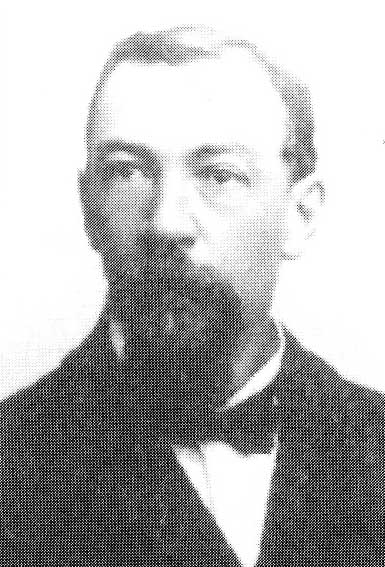

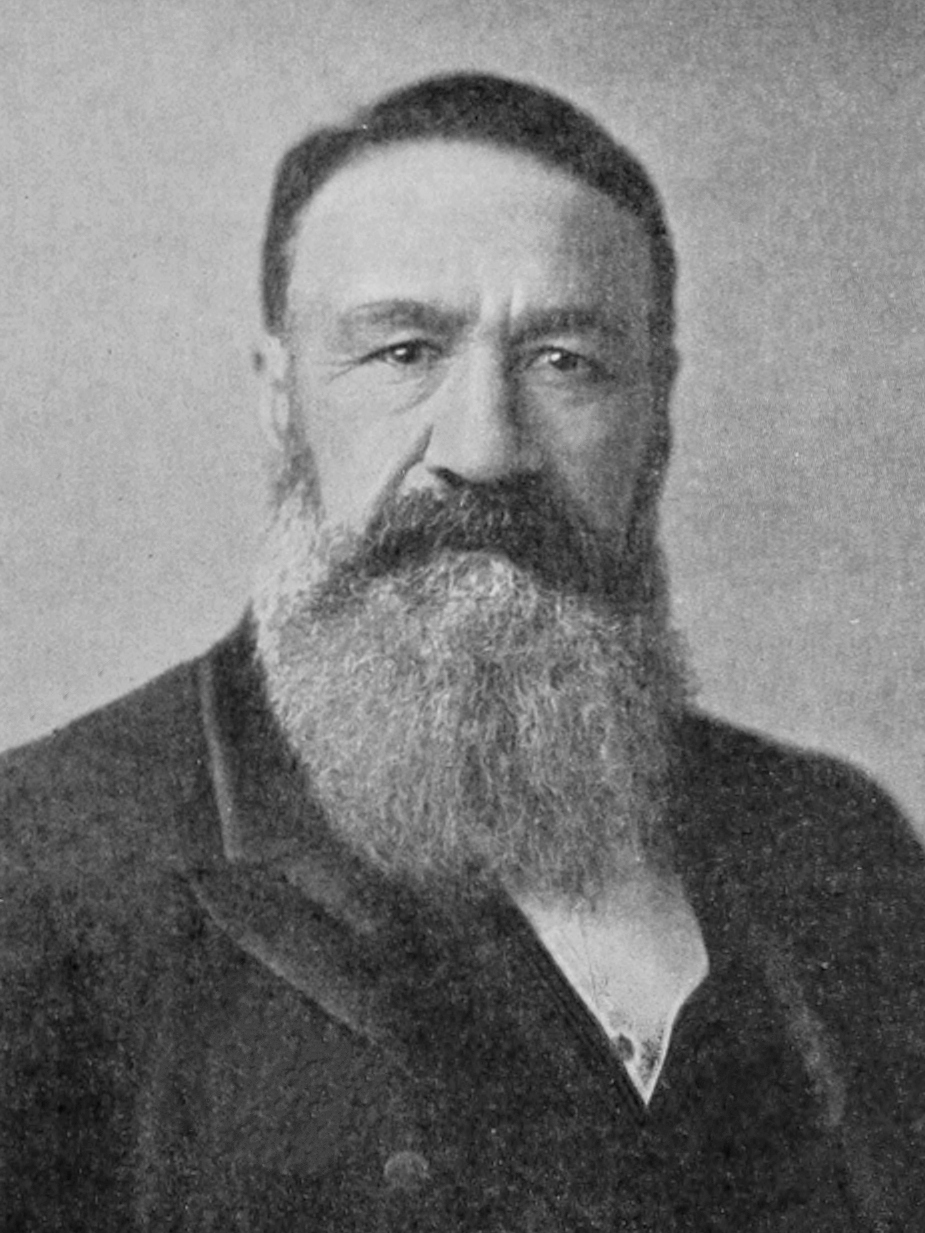
Nominee	Paul Kruger	Schalk Willem Burger	Piet Joubert
Popular vote	12,858	3,753	2,001
Percentage	69.08%	20.16%	10.75%
President before election
Paul Kruger
Elected President
Paul Kruger

Presidential elections were held in the South African Republic between 3 January and 4 February 1898. The result was a victory for incumbent Paul Kruger.

== Background ==
The incumbent president Paul Kruger was involved in a constitutional battle with Chief Justice John Gilbert Kotzé. After trying to unsuccessfully remove Kotzé though legislation, he waited until after the election to dismiss him.

== Candidates ==
Kruger ran for re-election alongside two challengers.

A distinguished member of the Volksraad and commandant of the Lydenburg Commando, Schalk Willem Burger was popular with the British and the capitalists of Johannesburg. This was due to the South African Industrial Report of 1897, produced by a committee under his leadership, which called for the lowering of tariffs, among other suggestions. Despite the conclusions of the report, Burger was an ardent patriot; however, the conclusions of the report and support from anti-ZAR newspapers led some voters to distrust him.

Vice-President and Commandant-General Piet Joubert had previously run against Kruger three times without success. He had narrowly lost against him in 1893, losing by around 900 votes, with allegations of electoral manipulation in favour of Kruger and reports of voter turnout being greater than 100%.

Claims were made that former Cape Colony Prime Minister Cecil Rhodes colluded against Kruger during the election campaign.

== Results ==
Candidate	Votes	%
Paul Kruger	12,858	69.08
Schalk Willem Burger	3,753	20.16
Piet Joubert	2,001	10.75
Total	18,612	100.00
Source: Annual Register

== Aftermath ==
After his re-election Kruger removed Kotzé from office.
