= Marshall's Horse =

- Active: 1899 - 30 October 1902
- Country: South Africa
- Branch: British Army
- Type: Horse Regiment
- Nickname: de Lisle's Pets

Commanders
- Major: George Marshall
- Lt Col: Robert Edwin Corbett

Marshall's Horse was a South African cavalry unit formed in 1899 at the start of the Second Boer War to provide military support for the British campaign. The unit was created from the Uitenhage Rifles and 1st City (Grahamstown) Volunteers. They formed in Grahamstown, initially comprising 244 members before rising to 500 in late 1899. The unit's first commanding officer was Major George Marshall CMG.

== Chronology of Events: 1899 ==
In 1899, William Philip Schreiner, Prime Minister of the Cape Colony, was engaged in a power struggle with its governor, Alfred Milner, regarding the extent to which South African colonial units should be deployed from their recruiting areas to support the wider British campaign. Consequently, Marshall's Horse were stationed in Grahamstown and patrolled the surrounding railway network until the last months of 1899 when Schreiner was forced to concede.

== 1900 ==
In early 1900, under Ridley's 4th Mounted Infantry Brigade, the Unit joined the British advance from the Modder River to Bloemfontein. This march included the Battle of Poplar Grove on 7 March in which Lieutenant Freislich was killed. A few weeks later, the Unit participated in an action at Thaba Nchu under General Ian Hamilton an event related in Winston Churchill's Ian Hamilton's March. Churchill observed "...our loses in this smart action were about twenty killed and wounded, among whom were no less than 5 officers" of Marshall's Horse. They also fought at Israel's Poort on 25 April 1900. Captain Gethin (pictured below) was killed that day. Marshall himself was wounded, to be replaced as Commanding Officer by Captain Corbett (Somersetshire Light Infantry). Lord Roberts mentioned their performance in his dispatches.

In the march on Pretoria, "Marshall's Horse frequently took a prominent share of the work. On 5 June at Schippen's Farm, for example, they had 1 killed and 5 wounded. They were engaged at Doornkop, south-west of Johannesburg, on 29 May, and in the Battle of Diamond Hill, east of Pretoria, on 11th, 12th, and 13 June, and had slight casualties in both actions. In the latter part of August and during September Marshall's Horse was employed about Krugersdorp and in the Gatsrand, and frequently had fighting and rather heavy casualties." On 5 September 1900, "around 5 kilometres north of Fochville" the Unit was engaged by Danie Theron. Four men were killed and three wounded while Theron is believed to have been killed by British artillery supporting Marshall's Horse. From October to December they were with Barton in Frederickstad, and on 18 October a foraging party was attacked, 2 men being killed and 4 wounded. The Unit took part in fierce fighting under Barton from 20 to 25 October, resulting in the local defeat of the enemy. Marshall's Horse had Lieutenant Mullins and 2 men wounded. On 17 October 1900, as part of Major General Barton's column, six members of Marshall's Horse were cut off by Boers whilst collecting supplies near Frederickstad. For their campaigning in 1900 the men of Marshall's Horse gained the nickname "de Lisle's Pets".

== 1901 ==
In early 1901 Marshall's Horse returned to Cape Colony following renewed enemy attacks in that region. This included fighting in the Zuurberg Mountains during which Lieutenant Cliff Turpin was killed and six men wounded at Dorignspoort on 24 March. On 1 April 1901 The Melbourne Argus reported the incident as follows: "A disaster has befallen Marshall's Horse...a patrol of the corps was surrounded by an overwhelming Boer force...After the officer in charge had been killed and five men wounded, the others surrendered. The prisoners were deprived of their horses and arms by the Boers, and were released." On 20 May 1901, Sergeant Claxton John Mason was killed in action in Steynsburg, Cape Colony. Later in the year the Unit formed detachments in the Transvaal and Gatsrand respectively.

== 1902 ==
In 1902 Marshall's Horse deployed to the west of Cape Colony. On 30 October 1902 the Unit was absorbed into the Cape Police.

Officers of Marshall's Horse, 1899. Back row of three: Lieut D G Tennant; Capt H B Capstick; Lieut F A Woodcock. Middle row, left: Lieut B L E Jay; Lieut J D Forbes. Middle row, right: Lieut S H Godwin; Lieut F H Nek; Capt H Gethin (killed in action). Front row of 6: Lieut G H Hull; Capt E G Booth; Hon Major H T Tamplin; Capt G Marshall (Officer Commanding); Capt & Adjt F A Saunders, Capt J R MacAndrew.

== Casualties ==
According to a memorial on the wall of St John the Baptist Church, Newport, Monmouthshire, 60 members of Marshall's Horse died during the Second Boer War. 30 in 1900, 14 in 1901 and 16 in 1902.

== Bibliography ==
- Churchill, Sir Winston (1989). Ian Hamilton's March, London: Cooper.
- Conan Doyle, Arthur (1902). The Great Boer War, London: Smith, Elder and Co.
- Parkhouse, Valerie (2015). Memorializing the Anglo-Boer War of 1899-1902: Militarization of the Landscape: Monuments and Memorials in Britain, Croydon, Troubador.
- Shearing, Hilary (2004). The Cape Rebel of the South African War, 1899–1902, PhD Thesis, Stellenbosch.
- Sphere, The (25 Jan 1902). Marshall's Horse, London, London Illustrated Newspapers.
- Stirling, John (1907). The Colonials in South Africa: 1899–1902, Edinburgh, Blackwood.
- Schoeman, Chris (2011). Brothers in Arms, Cape Town, Zebra.
