= Thomas François Burgers =

South African politician (1834–1881)

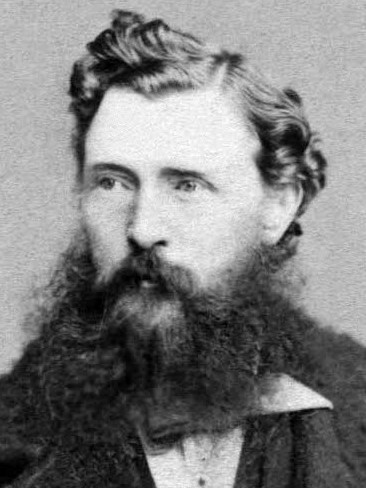

4th State President of the South African Republic
- In office 1 July 1872 – 12 April 1877
- Preceded by: Daniel Jacobus Erasmus
- Succeeded by: None (British annexation)

Personal details
- Born: 15 April 1834 Langefontein, Graaff-Reinet, Cape Colony
- Died: 9 December 1881 (aged 47) Richmond, Cape Colony
- Resting place: Heroes' Acre, Pretoria, Gauteng, South Africa
- Spouse: Mary Bryson (died 1881)
- Education: Utrecht University
- Occupation: Christian minister

Thomas François Burgers (15 April 1834 – 9 December 1881) was a Boer politician and minister who served as the 4th president of the South African Republic from 1872 to 1877. He was the youngest child of Barend and Elizabeth Burger of the farm Langefontein in the Camdeboo district of Graaff Reinet, Cape Colony.

== Early life ==
Burgers was born on 15 April 1834 in Langefontein, Graaff-Reinet.

After studying theology at the University of Utrecht in the Netherlands, Burgers became the parson of Hanover, South Africa, in 1859. He had been influenced by Professor C. W. Opzoomer in the Netherlands and embraced his rationalist, liberal ideas.

== Career ==
Burgers quickly became involved in a stormy controversy with the Dutch Reformed synod over his alleged liberalism and disbelief in the literal truth of the Bible. He was critical of traditional culture and strongly emphasised knowledge and rationalism. In 1862, his unorthodox doctrine brought on him an accusation of heresy, and in 1864, he was found guilty by the Synod and suspended. The Supreme Court overturned the decision, and in 1865, he was readmitted to the ministry. Some of his liberal theological ideas and his diverting viewpoints can be found in the sketches he wrote about daily life in Hanover.

The burghers of the South African Republic urged Burgers to stand for the presidency, and he was elected by the considerable majority of 2,964 to William Robinson’s 388 in 1872.

The South African Republic's first coins, the Burgerspond, were introduced by Burgers in 1874, responding to a demand for coinage from the populace dating back to 1853. Burgers sent a portrait of himself to his UK consul-general, who commissioned the coins to be struck at Heaton's Mint in Birmingham, England. Some people in the South African Republic objected to the issue of the Burgerspond, because the portrayal of the president on coins likened him to a dictator.

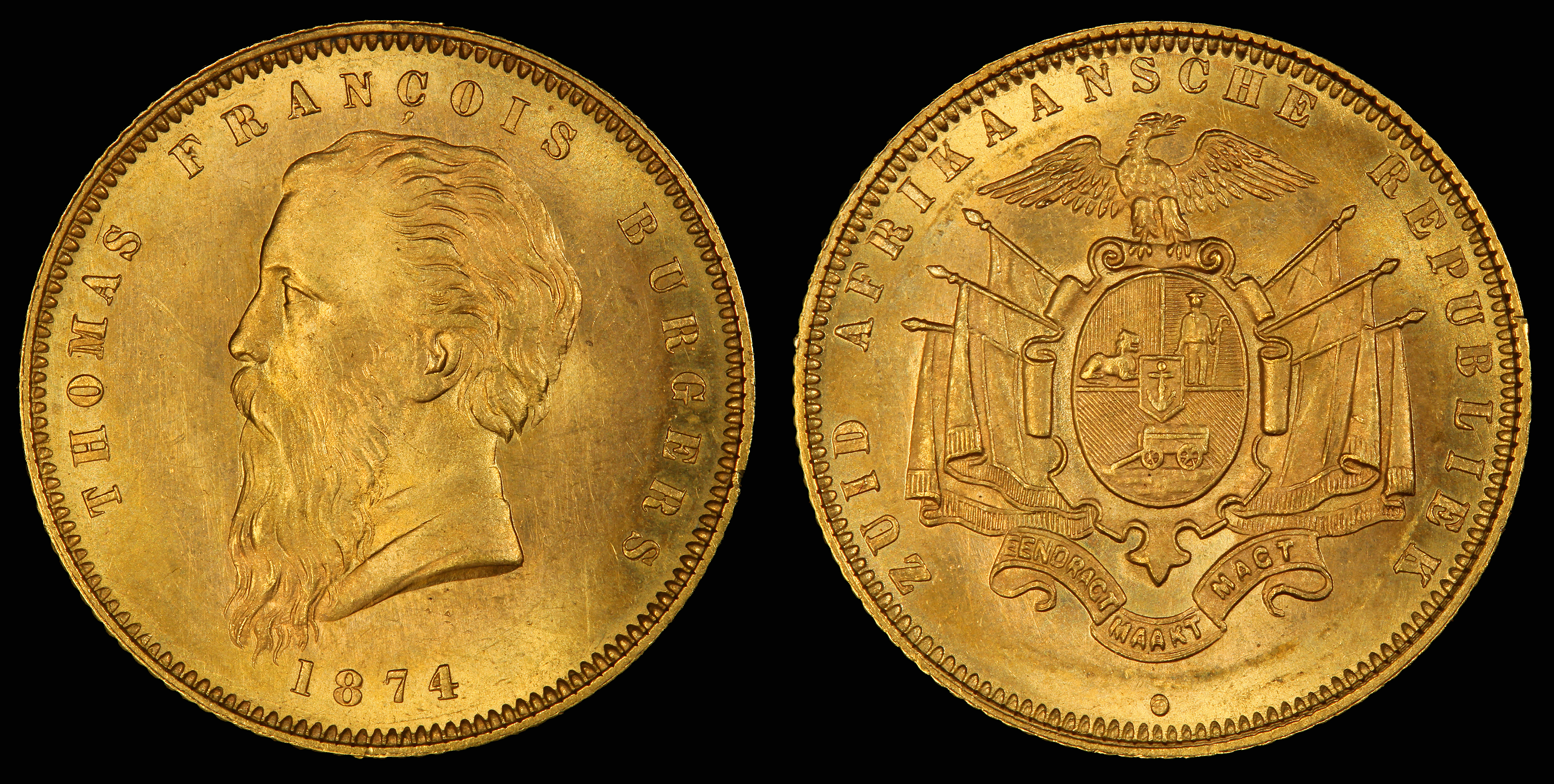
Burgers on a burgerspond

The 1905 New International Encyclopedia described Burgers's policies as president as "characterized by brilliant but impracticable schemes, aiming chiefly at territorial expansion." One of his plans, inspired by the neighbouring Cape Prime Minister John Molteno's massive railway programme, was to build a railway linking the Transvaal to the sea. In 1875, he traveled to Europe to raise funds, but his plans were thwarted by the Pedi chief Sekhukhune, whose lands lay in the path of the proposed railway.

By 1877, Burgers was very unpopular, and his government was insolvent. Britain, keen on expanding their empire, stepped in and annexed the Transvaal.

== Personal life and death ==
He married Mary Bryson (1836–1929).

Burgers retired from political life, settled in the Cape Colony again, and died in 1881, leaving his family destitute.

Coming to the family's aid, Burgers's former private secretary, Th.M. Tromp, published the sketches Burgers had written about his experiences as minister in Hanover. The proceeds of the book, in Dutch and published in the Netherlands, were used to alleviate his family's financial problems. He was a South African Freemason.

His body was disinterred in 1895 to be reburied in the Pretoria cemetery now known as the Heroes' Acre.

== See also ==
- Coins of the South African pound

== Bibliography ==
- Burgers, Th.F. (1882). Toneelen uit ons dorp. Den Haag: Henri J. Stemberg.
- Burgers, Th.F. (2008). Wium van Zyl (ed.). Tonele uit ons dorp. Kaapstad: Africana Uitgewers.
- Burgers, Thomas Francois (1979). M S Appelgryn (ed.). Staatspresident 1872-1877. Pretoria en Kaapstad: H.A.U.M.
