= Kitchener's Horse =

Colonial British Army unit during the Boar War

Kitchener's Horse were a colonial unit of the British Army during the Boer War of 1899–1902.
