= Stanford Norman McLeod Nairne =

Stanford Norman McLeod Nairne (Jamaica, 1 January 1841 – Bronkhorstspruit, 20 December 1880) was an officer and Adjutant of the 94th Regiment of Foot who died of wounds received during the first action of the First Boer War . He was called 'The Swart Captain' because of his mixed race, and he was mourned by both black and white people at his death.

== Early life ==
He was the son of Police Inspector Alexander Darnley Nairne (1805–1880) and his wife Anna Sarah both of Kingston Jamaica. Alexander Darnley Nairne was the son of Scotsman Daniel Nairne (born about 1750 Nairnshire, Scotland; died 1816 in Clarendon Parish, Jamaica) and Sarah Williams, a Free Black Woman who was born in Jamaica.

== Career ==
Stanford Nairne was commissioned as Ensign in the 94th Regiment of Foot in 1862. He was promoted to Lieutenant in 1869.

He married Amelia Samson (1840–1927) on 4 June 1863 at Melcombe Regis, Dorset, England. She is the daughter of Dr Alexander Samuel Samson of Weymouth Dorset. She accompanied her husband to India where he was serving with the 94th Regiment of Foot during the 1860s, and their only child (to live beyond infancy) was born there on 17 Sept 1865 at Umballa/Ambala, Bengal, India. They named her Beatrice Inez Jerome Cafe McLeod Nairne (1865–1943.)

=== Zulu War of 1879 ===
The 94th Regiment was stationed in Aldershot military base in Southern England in 1879. On 26 February seven companies of the 94th left Southampton for South Africa on the ship SS China. The total strength of the regiment on board was 28 officers and 897 other ranks including Commanding Officer Lt. Col S. Malthus and Captain S. N. M. Nairne. They took four weeks to cross the Atlantic, arriving at Simon's Bay near Cape Town on 25 March, and then reached Durban on 2 April after a further journey of 35 days.

They set up their camp just outside Durban and three days later on 6 April the 94th received orders to commence their march to the front. They marched into Pietermaritzburg on 8 April and left on 11 April and arrived at Greytown on 14 April 1879.

After marching more than a hundred miles north they encamped on the right bank of the White Mfolozi on 2 July 1879, within striking distance of Ulundi. They crossed the river and formed a large hollow rectangle before advancing across the Mahlabatini Plain and so took part in the Battle of Ulundi on 4 July. This was the final battle of the Anglo-Zulu War which resulted in a defeat for the Zulu army. The 94th marched with 20 officers and 593 other ranks. Their commanding officer was Lt. Col S. Malthus. His senior officers were Majors Murray and Anstruther, and five captains, including Captain Nairne who took charge of F Company.

The 94th Regiment then left Zululand, clad in tattered rags and marched into the Transvaal where all eight companies of the regiment took part in the successful attack on Sekhukhune's stronghold on 28 November 1879.

=== First Boer War of 1880 ===
In 1880 the 94th were widely distributed throughout the Transvaal, and one of the garrisons was established at Lydenburg (consisting of A and F Companies.) Capt Nairne was as usual in command of F Company. It was during the re-concentration of the companies in December 1880, in response to outbreaks of civil disorder by the Boers that A and F companies were ordered to march from Leydenberg to Pretoria. They were attacked at Bronkhorstspruit in what proved to be the opening clash of the First Boer War.

The 94th lost one officer (Lieutenant Herbert Augustine Christopher Harrison) and 53 men killed in the carnage of the attack. Another four officers and 88 men received wounds of which three officers (Lt.Col. Philip Robert Anstruther, Captain Stanford Norman McLeod Nairne and Captain James MacSwiney) and 18 men later died. One officer and 105 men became prisoners of the Boers. Details of the ensuing siege of the British garrison at Lydenberg by the Boers are recorded by Mary Long the wife of the Lieutenant who was left in charge of the garrison at Lydenberg in her book Peace and War in the Transvaal. Lt Long (with 50 men) was left in charge of stores at Lydenberg while the 94th marched from Lydenberg to Bronkhorstspruit where they were ambushed.

Captain Nairne was originally buried with his fellow officers in a walled enclosure at the site of the battle. The gravestones were later moved to their present site near the battlefield which is a few km south of Bronkhorstspruit on the road to Delmas.
