= Siege of Marabastad =

- Part of the First Boer War
Date	11 January 1881 – 2 April 1881
Location	Marabastad Fort, British-occupied Transvaal (Transvaal Colony)
Result	Boer victory; Marabastad is captured

Belligerents
Britain	South African Republic

Commanders and leaders
(United Kingdom of Great Britain and Ireland) Cap. E.S. Brook (United Kingdom of Great Britain and Ireland) Cap. Thompson (United Kingdom of Great Britain and Ireland) Lt. F.G.W. Jones (United Kingdom of Great Britain and Ireland) Lt. Gleniston	(South African Republic) Commandant Barend Vorster

Strength
50–60 men of the 94th Regiment; 30 European volunteers 43–50 men from the Transvaal Mounted Police; Total: 123–140 soldiers	100 men

Casualties and losses
5 killed 8 wounded	Unknown

The siege of Marabastad was a siege of Fort Marabastad, in present day Limpopo, South Africa, carried out by the Boer Republic of Transvaal, starting on 11 January 1881, and ending with British surrender on 2 April 1881. It took place during the First Boer War, during which Boer forces besieged several British garrisons across the country.

== Background ==
In early 1880, British forces in Transvaal decided to build a fort in the village, due to its remoteness from other British South African forts, with it being 165 miles (266 km) from Pretoria. Marabastad and the Zoutpansberg district had a population of 300,000–400,000 natives, along with an additional 175,000 in Waterberg. A fort was needed to control the large native population. In February 1880, two detachments of the 94th Regiment, under Captain Campbell, reached Marabastad, the first British forces to reach this part of South Africa. Within three months, the fort had been built.

On 29 November 1880, Captain Campbell was ordered to march to Pretoria. Along with a company of 60 men, Campbell left for the city, leaving behind a company of 60 men in Marabastad. Campbell left Captain E.S. Brooks in command, along with Lieutenant F.G.W. Jones and Surgeon Harding, A.M.D.

== Preparations for the siege ==
Following the British defeat at Bronkhorstspruit on 20 December, Lieutenant Jones received orders to prepare for siege. Captain Brook immediately began preparations. He expanded his command, recruiting 30 English volunteers. They were joined by 50 South African Natives from the Transvaal Mounted Police, commanded by Captain Thompson and Lieutenant Gleniston, which had marched forty miles south from Wood-Bush.

In December, a trench of 25 square yards was dug around the fort. Supplies of food and ammunition were stored and corn seized from the natives.

== Siege ==
In January, the Boers approached Marabastad. They were divided into two laagers - one at Sand Spruit and one at Botha's Farm. On 11 January, Commandant Barend Vorster requested Captain Brook to stop taking corn from the village, effectively beginning the siege. On 19 January, a British patrol of 15 Transvaal Mounted Police under Thompson and ten volunteers were sent to scout the Boers at Sand Spruit. They were unexpectedly attacked and defeated by a larger force, leaving one policeman dead and two wounded, along with two volunteers wounded. The Boers also suffered several men injured. The patrol quickly retreated to the fort, with the two policemen being taken prisoner. Following this engagement, Vorster requested Captain Brook to surrender, but also told Brook that he would not attack the British as long as no more reconnaissance took place.
