= Walter Long (lieutenant) =

Lieutenant Walter Hillyar Colquhoun Long
- Born: 20 October 1858; London, United Kingdom
- Died: 18 February 1892 (aged 33); London, United Kingdom
- Military career
- Allegiance: United Kingdom
- Branch: British Army
- Rank: Second lieutenant
- Units: 6th Dragoons; 94th Foot
- Conflicts: First Boer War: Siege of Lydenburg

Walter Hillyar Colquhoun Long (20 October 1858 – 18 February 1892) was a British Army officer who fought in the First Boer War.

He was first commissioned into the 2nd Somerset Militia as a sub-lieutenant in March 1877, but in October of that year he was ranked as lieutenant, backdated to March. In October 1878 he was transferred to the 6th Dragoons with the rank of second lieutenant, and in March 1880 he was transferred again to the 94th Regiment of Foot. As part of the 94th Regiment, at the age of 24 he played a crucial part in the defence of Lydenburg during a three month siege in 1881.

He was the son of the landowner and politician Walter Long. After he was court-martialled and criticised for his conduct of the defence of Lydenburg, in February 1892 he took his life at the Grosvenor Hotel, Buckingham Palace Road, Westminster; he was described as "formerly of Paris".
