= Siege of Lydenburg =

Coordinates: 25.096°S 30.446°E

- Part of First Boer War
Date	6 January 1881 – 30 March 1881
Location	Lydenburg, British-occupied Transvaal (Transvaal Colony)
Result	Boer victory; Lydenburg is captured

Belligerents
United Kingdom	South African Republic

Commanders and leaders
(United Kingdom of Great Britain and Ireland) 2Lt. Walter Long	(South African Republic) Commandant Dietrich Muller (South African Republic) Commandant Johannes Petrus Steyn

Units involved
94th Regiment of Foot; Royal Engineers	Unknown

Strength
50–55 men (94th Regiment); 7–8 men (Royal Engineers); 8–10 men (Army Service Corps) Total: 60–70 men	6 January 1881: 200–250 men Following 6 January: 500–600 men

Casualties and losses
3-4 killed 19 wounded	unknown

The siege of Lydenburg was a siege carried out by South African Republican forces on British-occupied Lydenburg, between January and March 1881 during the First Boer War. Despite fierce British resistance, the Boers reclaimed the town following the British defeat at the end of the war. The siege lasted 84 days.

== Background ==
Lydenburg had fallen under the control of the full-strength 94th Regiment. On 5 December 1880, most of the regiment was withdrawn, under Lieutenant-Colonel Anstruther. Fewer than 100 British soldiers were left to maintain British occupation over the town under the command of Second Lieutenant Walter Long, son of the British politician with the same name. On 20 December 1880, six officers and 246 men of the 94th Regiment, along with 12 men of the Army Service Corps and 4 men of the Army Hospital Corps, were attacked by 250 Boer commandos at Bronkhorstspruit whilst marching from Lydenburg to Pretoria. They suffered 156 casualties. This began the First Boer War.

== Preparations ==
Following the outbreak of the war, Long received orders from Pretoria to defend Lydenburg. Long acted by building a fort and constructing stone walls around it to improve defences. The fort, known as Fort Mary, consisted of eight thatched huts connected by stone walls. Fort Mary provided cover for British forces and would allow Long to successfully fight off the Boers for three months. The British stored 200,000 rounds of ammunition, left behind by the main force of the 94th Regiment under Anstruther, in preparation for a Boer siege. The British had at their disposal three months' supply of meat, eight months' supply flour for bread making, and supplies of groceries and vegetables, in order to survive the siege.

== Siege ==
On 23 December 1880, Dietrich Muller entered Lydenburg and informed Long that his government had demanded the immediate surrender of Lydenburg. Long refused to capitulate, and the Boers prepared to besiege. Commandos took positions two miles away from the road to Middelburg on 3 January 1881 and then advanced on Lydenburg on the 6th. Over two hundred burghers breached the town and proclaimed their allegiance to the South African Republic, again requesting Long to surrender. Long refused, and the Boer contingent grew to about five hundred men. As the Boers advanced through Lydenburg, they neared Fort Mary, and opened fire at 230 metres. The garrison was not harmed, despite sporadic firing for three hours. Two days later, on 8 December, a cannon was brought to bear, which also failed to impress the fort or inflict any casualties on Long's men. However, a second cannon brought later damaged Fort Mary's defences.

On 23 January 1881, the garrison discovered that its water supply was running low. Water was temporarily rationed until rainfall on 8 February brought relief.

On 4 March 1881, Boers successfully set fire to the thatched roofs of Fort Mary. British forces managed to put out the fire in twenty minutes but whilst doing so, they came under heavy Boer fire.

On 10 March, two Boers entered Lydenburg with a letter from Alfred Aylward, offering favourable terms of surrender to the British. Aylward stated Long should surrender due to the small size of his command and as there were no British troops in South Africa, close to Lydenburg, available to relieve the siege. Long replied that he would not surrender as long as he had men at his disposal or until he was told otherwise.

On 23 March, Boers again entered Lydenburg, informing Long of the death of Major-General George Colley at Majuba Hill, and requesting British surrender. Still, the siege continued until 30 March 1881, when Lieutenant Baker, from the 60th regiment, agreed to peace terms with the Boers. The siege lasted for 84 days.

== Aftermath ==
Following the capture of Lydenburg and other British forts in Transvaal, the South African Republic regained independence and control over its territories. British forces would again enter Lydenburg during the Second Boer War.

== External sources ==
- John Laband: The Transvaal Rebellion: The First Boer War, 1880-1881 (ISBN 978-0-582-77261-8)
- Charles Norris-Newman: With the Boers in the Transvaal and Orange Free State 1880-81 (ISBN 978-0-949973-18-4)
- Francis Hugh De Souza: A Question Of Treason (ISBN 978-0-620-32030-6)
- Lady Bellairs: The Transvaal war, 1880-81 (ISBN 978-1-163-12516-8)
- Ian Castle: Majuba 1881: The Hill of Destiny (ISBN 978-1-85532-503-6)
- M. Gough Palmer: The Besieged Towns of the First Boer War, 1880-1881
- First Anglo-Boer War 1880-1881
