= Flawn (surname) =

Flawn or Flaun
- Language: English

Origin
- Language: Old French / Medieval English
- Meaning: Custard or pancake

Flawn is an occupational surname for a maker of pancakes or custard from an old French word ″flaon″. The Normans introduced the word into medieval English as ″flawn″ or ″flaun″. The first record of the surname is from 1327 in the Cambridgeshire Subsidy Roll is of Elena Fflaun. Variant spellings of the surname include Flawne, Flanne, Flaune, Flan and Flanner.

Notable people with the surname include:

- Peter T. Flawn, Professor of Geological Sciences and Director of Economic Geology at the University of Texas
- Thomas Flawn, English recipient of the Victoria Cross
