= Francois Gerhardus Joubert =

Boer general (1827–1903)

Francois Gerhardus Joubert (1827–1903) was a Boer general. He was born in 1827 in the Cape Colony. He followed Andries Pretorius to the Transvaal and was elected to the People's Assembly. He became a leader during the First Boer War on 17 December 1880 and was the commander during the action at Bronkhorstspruit during which the British commander Colonel Anstruther died. He died in 1903.
