= Francis Fitzpatrick (VC) =

Irish recipient of the Victoria Cross

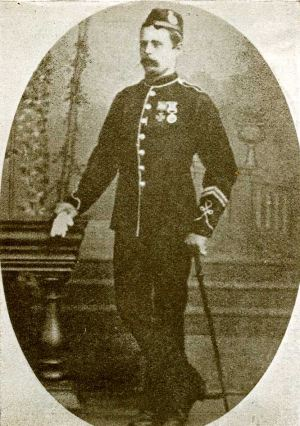
- Born: 1859; Tullycorbet, County Monaghan
- Died: 10 July 1933 (aged c74); Glasgow, Scotland
- Burial place: Saint Kentigerns Cemetery, Glasgow, Scotland
- Military career
- Allegiance: United Kingdom
- Branch: British Army
- Rank: Private
- Units: 94th Regiment of Foot
- Wars: Campaign against Sekukuni
- Awards: Victoria Cross

Francis Fitzpatrick VC (born in Tullycorbet, County Monaghan in 1859 – 10 July 1933) was an Irish recipient of the Victoria Cross, the highest and most prestigious award for gallantry in the face of the enemy that can be awarded to British and Commonwealth forces.

== Military career ==
He was about 20 years old, and a Private in the 94th Regiment of Foot (later The Connaught Rangers), British Army during the campaign against Sekukuni when the following deed took place for which he was awarded the VC.

On 28 November 1879 during an attack on Sekukuni's Town, South Africa, Private Fitzpatrick and another private (Thomas Flawn) with six men of the Native Contingent, were with a lieutenant of the 1st Dragoon Guards when he was badly wounded. The natives carried the wounded officer at first, but when the party was pursued by about 30 of the enemy they deserted and the lieutenant would have been killed but for the gallantry of the two privates - one carrying him and the other covering the retreat and firing on the enemy.

== Later life ==
Fitzpatrick died in Glasgow, Scotland, on 10 July 1933. He was buried at St Kentigern's Cemetery, Glasgow

== The medal ==
His Victoria Cross is displayed at the National Army Museum (Chelsea, England).
