= Archibald Maclaine (British Army officer) =

Scottish soldier

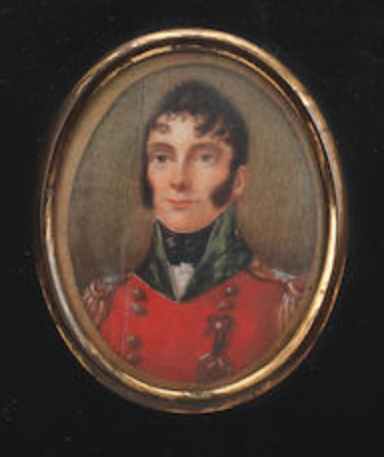
Sir Archibald Maclaine, in uniform when commander of the 52nd Foot

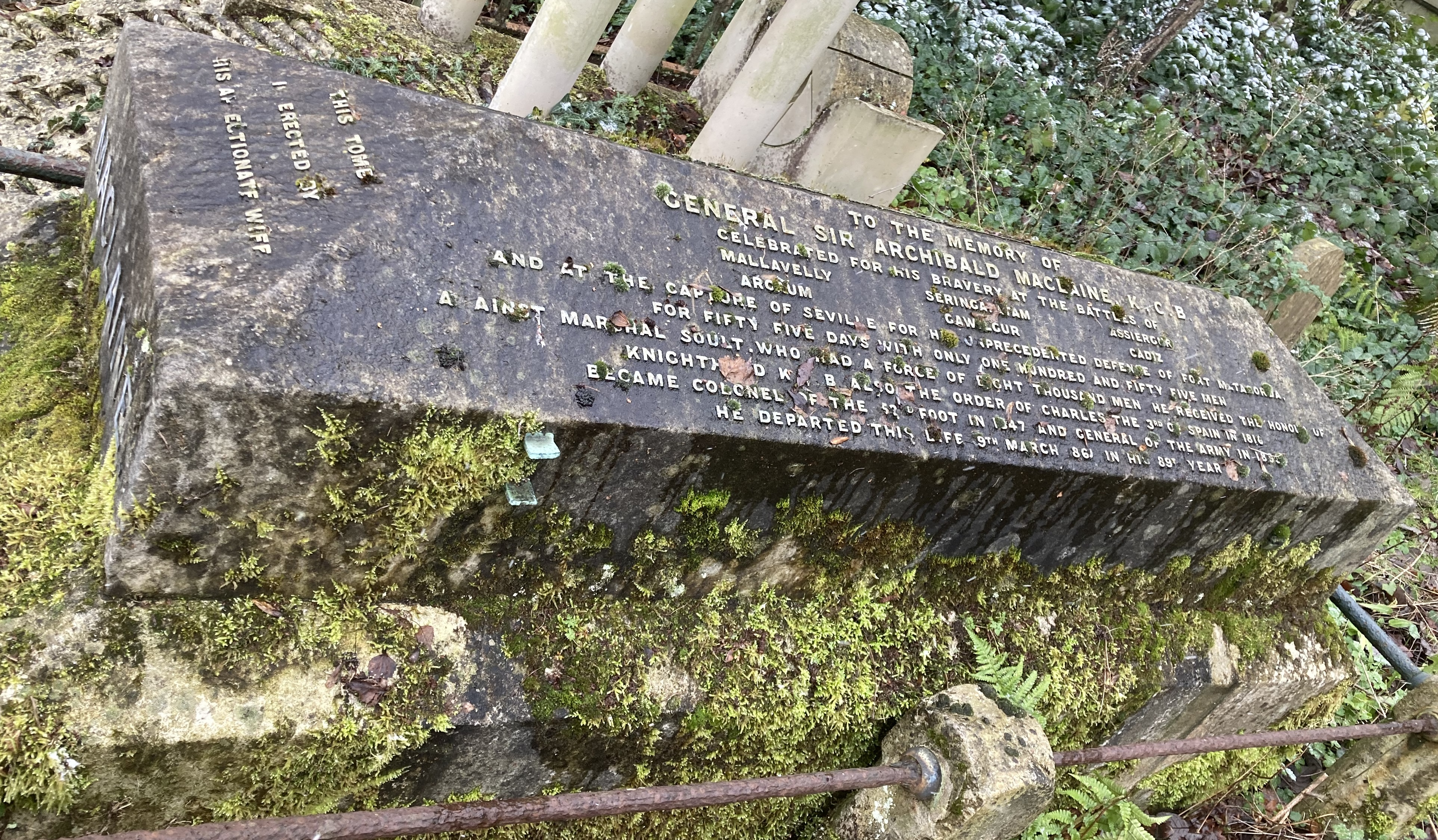
Grave of General Sir Archibald Maclaine in Highgate Cemetery (west side)

Archibald McLaine (13 January 1777, Isle of Mull – 9 March 1861, London) was a Scottish soldier who served in the British Army.

Early in his military career he was a Captain in the 94th Regiment of Foot. During the Siege of Cádiz he led a detachment of 155 men who held back Marshal Soult with a force of 8,000 men. Maclaine was knighted for this exploit and promoted to Major. After serving in the 87th Regiment of Foot, he joined the 7th West India Regiment with the rank of lieutenant-Colonel.

From 1847 until his death in 1861 he commanded the 52nd Regiment of Foot. He is buried in Highgate Cemetery, London.
