= Battle of Bronkhorstspruit =

1880 battle of the First Boer War

- Part of First Boer War
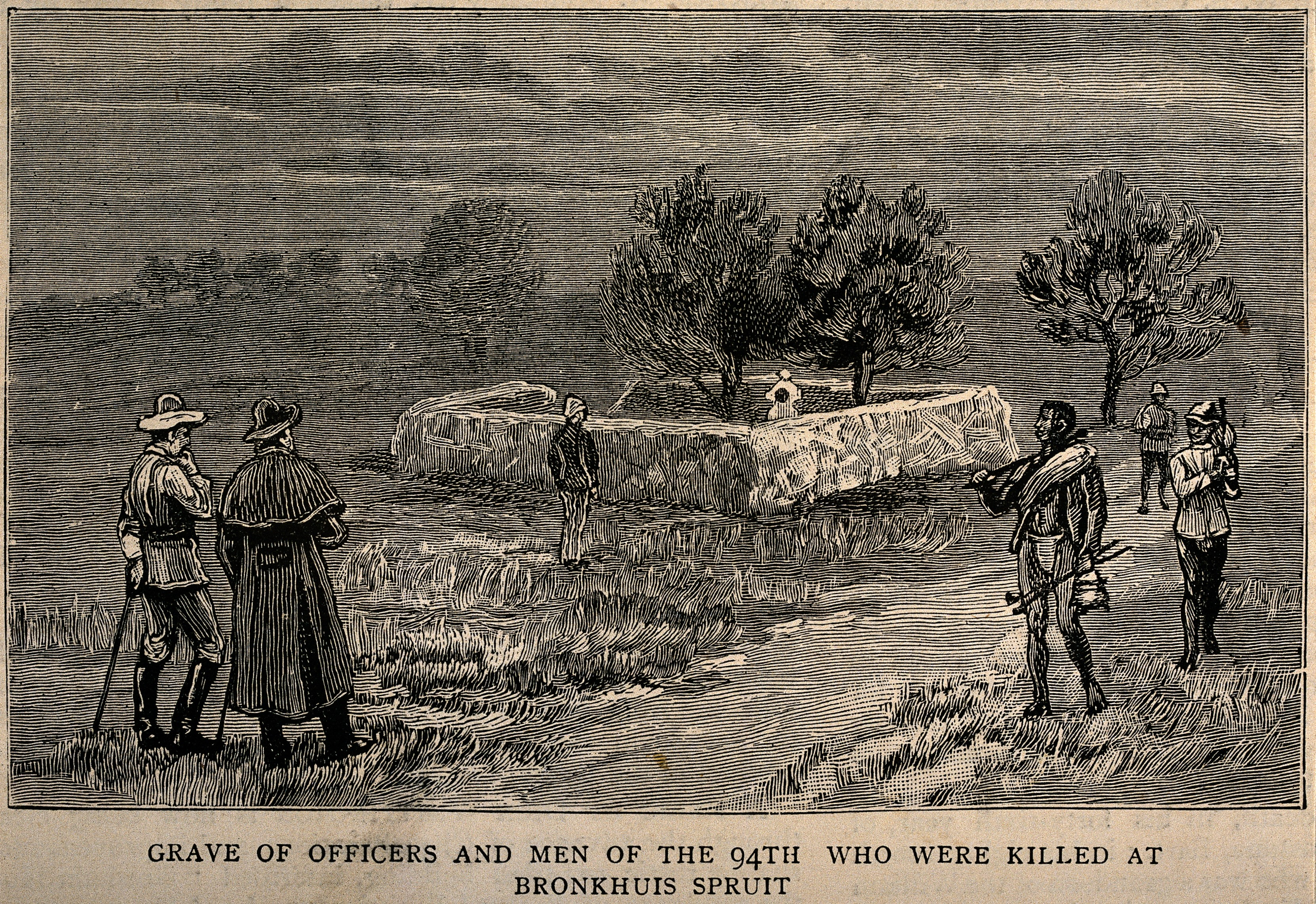
- A 1901 engraving of the grave of the British soldiers killed at Bronkhorstspruit
Date	20 December 1880
Location	Bronkhorstspruit (river), Transvaal 25°50′25″S 28°44′31″E
Result	Boer victory

Belligerents
United Kingdom	South African Republic (Boers)

Commanders and leaders
Philip Robert Anstruther (DOW)	Francois Gerhardus Joubert

Strength
245–270	250–300

Casualties and losses
157 casualties	5–7 casualties

The Battle of Bronkhorstspruit was the first major engagement of the First Boer War. It took place by the Bronkhorstspruit river, near the town of Bronkhorstspruit, Transvaal, on 20 December 1880. Threatened by the growing numbers of militant Boers in the Pretoria region, the British recalled the 94th Regiment of Foot, which had several companies garrisoned in towns and villages across the wider area. The regiment's commanding officer, Lieutenant Colonel Philip Robert Anstruther, led a 34-wagon column consisting of roughly 250 men on a 188-mile (303 km) journey from Lydenburg back to Pretoria. A similar-sized Boer commando force, led by Francois Gerhardus Joubert, was ordered to intercept and stop the British.

Despite several warnings of the threat of attack, the British travelled largely unprepared for combat, and the many wagons accompanying them slowed their progress significantly. On 20 December, 24 days after receiving the order to return, Anstruther's column was confronted by the Boers, who demanded under truce that the British stop their march. Anstruther refused, and the Boers attacked while the British soldiers were still preparing. The British suffered heavy casualties and surrendered after about 15 minutes; the survivors were captured. Anstruther was badly wounded and died of his injuries a few days later.

== Background ==
Southern Africa was first settled by Europeans in the mid-17th century when the Dutch set up a provision station at the Cape of Good Hope. Over the subsequent decades, more settlers followed and moved further inland. These settlers, known as Free Burghers, developed an independence that became a distinctive feature of their descendants, the Boers. In the early 19th century, the British captured the Dutch Cape Colony as it provided a strategic advantage during the Napoleonic Wars. The British imposed their 1833 slavery ban—which made the purchase or ownership of slaves illegal, and emancipated slaves across the British Empire—on the Cape Colony, at significant financial cost to the Boers. Along with the monetary loss, the Boers were increasingly baffled and angered by the British sentimentality towards the native African population. In contrast with the Boers' deeply held religious beliefs regarding the African natives' inferiority, the British supposedly treated them as equal to white European settlers at least when it came to disputes, and would deny the Boers from taking punitive action against raiding tribes.

During the late 1830s, no longer willing to live under British rule, thousands of Boers moved north and east in the Great Trek, abandoning the British Cape Colony and crossing the Orange River into lands unclaimed by European settlers. These voortrekkers (pioneers) battled native tribes such as the Matabele and Zulu, and established several independent Boer republics. One of these, the Republiek Natalia (Natalia Republic), was short-lived: it was established in 1838 and annexed by the British Empire in 1843, driving the Boers on yet further. The British again pressed their own claims, annexing the area between the Orange and Vaal rivers as the Orange River Sovereignty in 1848. Four years later, they signed the Sand River Convention, granting independence to Boers north of the Vaal, an area the British called the Transvaal, and recognising the establishment of the Zuid-Afrikaansche Republiek (South African Republic) there.

Successive British governments debated colonial policy over the next couple of decades, but despite repeated calls from administrators for the forced merger and federalisation of the southern African states under British control, a hands-off, anti-expansion policy remained in place. The discovery of diamonds in 1867 and gold in 1873 changed this thinking; rather than viewing South Africa as too complex and costly, the British saw the potential for an economic boom. Along with other socio-political factors, this led to the annexation of Griqualand West in 1873, and the South African Republic in 1877.

The Transvaal region had a population of 36000 to 45000 Boers, mostly spread around the countryside on farms, and around 5000 British settlers. (Note: The white population of the Transvaal was heavily outnumbered by the native African population, which numbered between 700000 and 800000.) Pretoria, the capital, had a population of roughly 2250. The majority of the Boer population opposed the annexation, and considered the British to be an occupying force. The Boers sent political delegations to London in 1877 and 1878, but on both occasions their pleas to reverse the annexation were rejected. By the end of 1879, British defeats of the Zulu and Bapedi, both of which had previously raided in the region, eliminated them as significant threats to the Boers. As a result, the majority of the Boer population no longer saw the need for the protective presence of British troops and administrators in the Transvaal. Demonstrations were held against what was seen as an unjustifiable and unnecessary occupation. By March 1880 the election of a new Liberal government in London, known to oppose the annexation, had quieted unrest in the Transvaal. However, Prime Minister William Ewart Gladstone, concerned with Irish and other issues, informed the Boer leaders that the British Empire would not relinquish the Transvaal. As a result, the Boer leadership began to prepare for an insurrection.

== Prelude ==
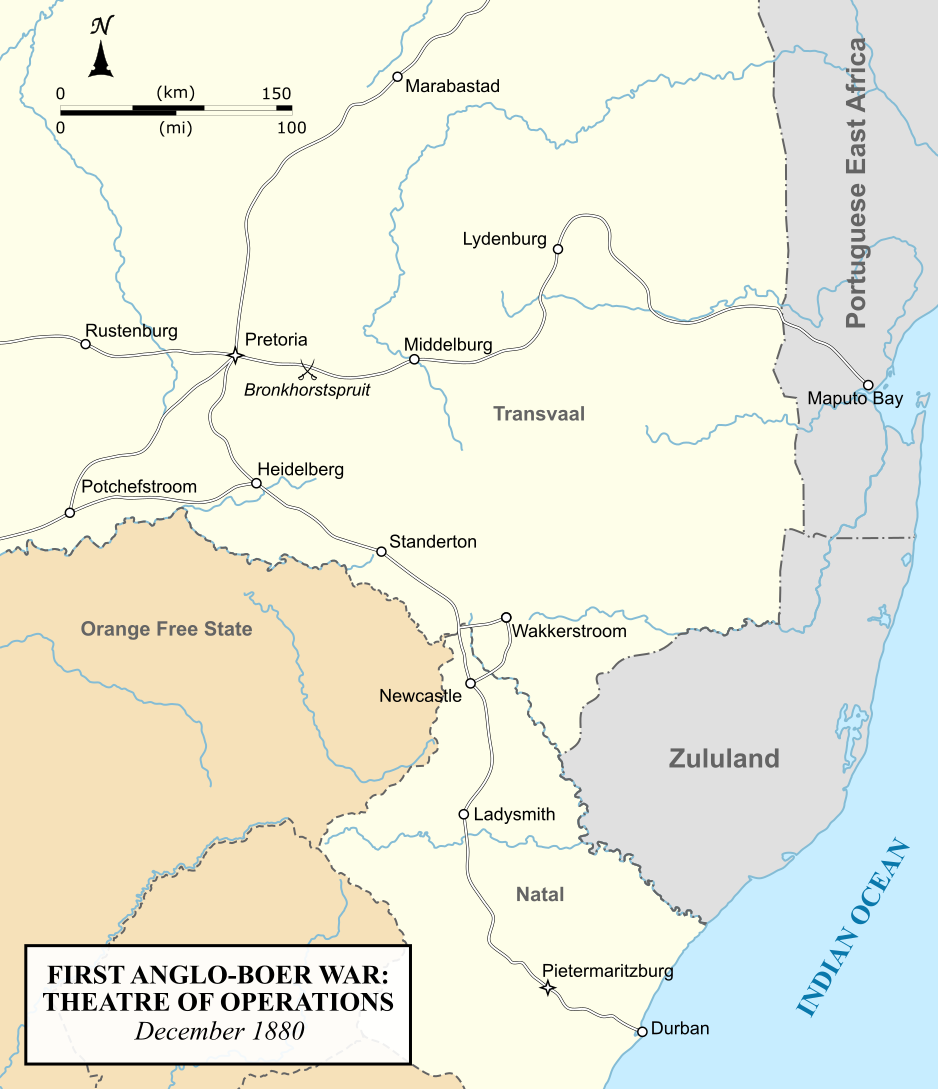
Map of the British colonies of Natal and Transvaal, showing the location of Bronkhorstspruit and principal towns in the region

Map showing the movement of the two forces before the battle

In November 1880, following the directive of the British colonial administrator, Colonel Owen Lanyon, a local magistrate in Potchefstroom (roughly 95 miles (153 km) south-west of Pretoria) seized a wagon from a Boer, Piet Bezuindenhout, for alleged non-payment of taxes, and put it up for auction. An armed party of a hundred Boers, led by Piet Cronjé, arrived in support of Bezuindenhout and reclaimed the wagon. This led Lanyon to mobilise men from the Pretoria garrison to arrest the Boers, but when it became clear that he did not have sufficient men to deal with the growing threat of a general uprising, he decided to recall men from outlying garrisons, to concentrate his strength in Pretoria while he waited for reinforcements from Natal. In all, he had around 1,800 regular troops spread around the Transvaal region to protect British interests, primarily composed of the 94th Regiment of Foot and the 2nd Battalion, 21st Regiment (Royal Scots Fusiliers). Roughly 700 of these were centred in Pretoria, the rest being stationed in the smaller towns of Rustenburg, Lydenburg, Marabastad, Standerton and Wakkerstroom.

=== British troop movement from Lydenburg ===
On 27 November, the commanding officer of the 94th Regiment—Lieutenant Colonel Philip Robert Anstruther, who commanded the garrison at Lydenburg—received orders to withdraw his men to reinforce Pretoria. The garrison comprised the headquarters and two companies of the 94th Regiment, roughly 300–330 men. Similar orders were sent to the other regimental companies garrisoned at Marabastad and Wakkerstroom. The soldiers based in Marabastad left that village on 30 November and arrived in Pretoria on 10 December. Anstruther meanwhile delayed his departure, waiting for more wagons to be acquired. Rather than set off with the regulation-standard number of wagons (roughly 10 to 12), Anstruther waited until he had 34, to carry personal items, rations and all the quartermaster's stores. This delayed his departure on the 188-mile (303 km) journey to 5 December. He left roughly 60 men to hold Lydenburg, taking approximately 245–270 soldiers, two wives, a widow and two children back to Pretoria. The British were also accompanied by around 60 native Africans to drive the wagons and look after the oxen.

Anstruther's large wagon train made travelling slow; the British averaged 9 miles (14 km) per day, but delays caused by swollen river crossings and muddy trails meant they sometimes covered as little as 3 miles (5 km). They reached Middelburg, less than halfway through their journey, on 15 December, and remained there the following day to allow their oxen to rest. A further delay ensued the following day; the column reached the Olifants River but was unable to cross due to the high water levels. During this wait, Anstruther received a communication from Colonel William Bellairs warning him of the possibility of a surprise attack as the Boers were taking up arms in the area. Anstruther had also been warned by apparently friendly Boers that insurgents were trying to turn local sympathies against his progress. The modern historian John Laband describes Anstruther as "bluff, good-natured and unfussed, with an amiable contempt for the Boers whose ability to take strong, concerted action he discounted."

The British crossed the Olifants on 19 December and continued to Honey's farm, 6 miles (10 km) east of a small river known as the Bronkhorstspruit. Despite the warnings they had received, when they set off the next morning, the soldiers were only carrying 30 rounds of ammunition per man, rather than the regulation 70; only four scouts were posted, two ahead and two behind the main body; and the 40 men of the band were playing, leaving them unarmed.

=== Boer commando ===
While Anstruther's column marched from Lydenburg, thousands of Boers were gathering around Pretoria, and on 13 December they elected leaders and declared independence from British rule, reestablishing the South African Republic. Francois Gerhardus Joubert (who was the uncle of Piet Joubert, one of the triumvirate of Boer leaders) was ordered by the Boer leadership to stop Anstruther from reaching Pretoria. He left Heidelberg on 18 December and rendezvoused with two other forces en route. They camped halfway between Pretoria and Bronkhorstspruit overnight on 19 December and the next morning planned their attack. Nicolaas Smit, who had combat experience from the Pedi wars, suggested flexibility rather than a set ambush, and so they continued east towards Middelburg to intercept the British column. Francois Joubert mobilised the Boer militia in Middelburg; a commando from there travelled parallel to the British, but hidden from them, though at one stage British officers noticed an unusually large number of riding horses at a Boer farm, but thought nothing of it.

== Opposing forces ==
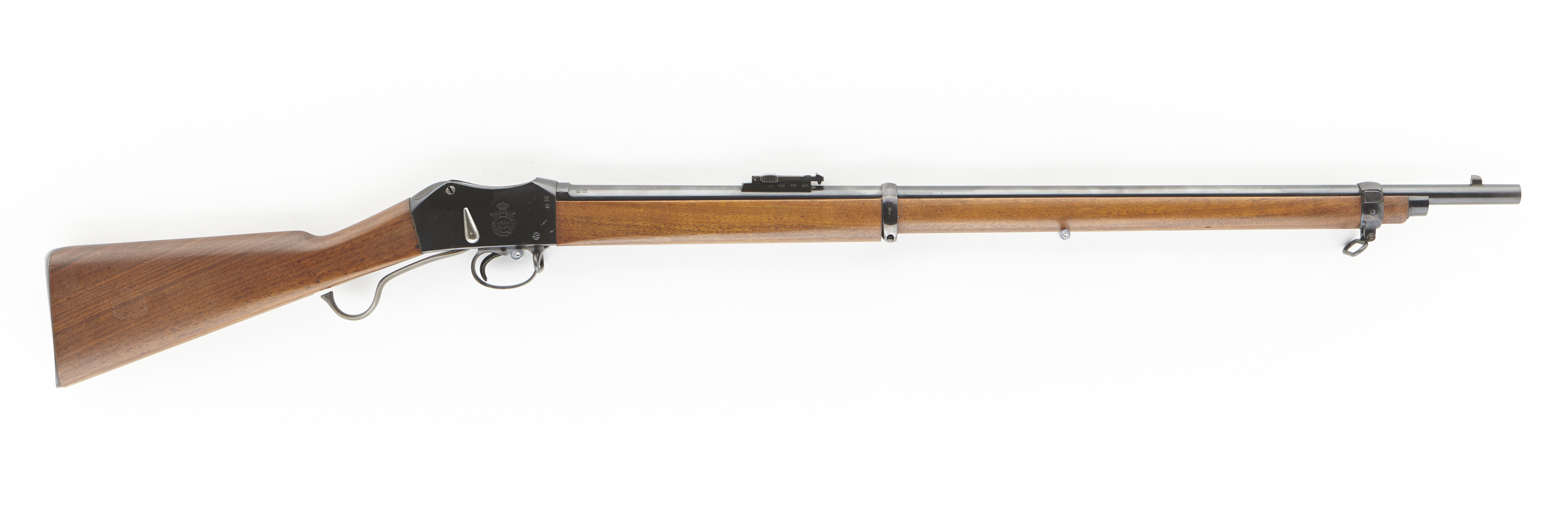
A Martini–Henry Mk III, the standard weapon of the British infantry during the First Boer War

The British infantry were armed with the Martini–Henry Mk III rifle, firing .577 / .450-inch (14.7 / 11.4 mm) ammunition, and fitted with a 25.25-inch-long (641 mm) bayonet. They wore the traditional red coat of the British Army, with blue trousers. A few months after the battle of Bronkhorstspruit, a question was raised in the British parliament, which criticised the uniforms for being "conspicuous", and therefore allowed "the Boers to shoot them down without danger to themselves". Hugh Childers, the Secretary of State for War, said in response that there was no need to change the uniforms, though the red coat was phased out over the subsequent eighteen years. The exact composition of the British column at Bronkhorstspruit is unclear; Laband lists 6 officers and 246 men in the 94th Regiment, along with 2 officers and 4 or 5 men from the Army Service Corps, a surgeon of the Army Medical Department, and 3 men from the Army Hospital Corps. Another historian, G. R. Duxbury, gives slightly different numbers for the 94th Regiment—6 officers and 230 men—but broadly agrees on the other figures. According to the British historian Ian Castle, after having fought in the Anglo-Zulu War of 1879, a series of battles against Sekhukhune, and then experiencing "tedious periods of garrison duty in isolated posts", the 94th Regiment was low on morale, and facing increasing levels of desertion.

The Boers had no standing army, nor any formal command structure. Instead, every Boer male (known as a burgher) between the ages of 16 and 60 was required to be ready for unpaid military service. They had no uniforms and had to provide their own horse, tack, rifle and 30 rounds of ammunition. Each town raised its own militia unit, known as a commando, which depending on the population of the area could vary in number widely, from 60 to 4000. Many Boers were keen hunters and typically learned to shoot as children. They used a variety of rifles, but the most common was the .500 / .450-inch (12.7 / 11.4 mm) calibre Westley Richards, a falling-block, breech-loading rifle. The South African historian Felix Machanik said that, although common wisdom held that the British had the superior firearms and firepower, he believed the Boers held an advantage, "because they were second to none in handling and firing their weapons and they fired and re-loaded with such rapidity that the British were often misled into thinking that there were three or four times as many as there actually were." They typically fought as mounted infantry, and employed guerrilla tactics, using the mobility provided by the horses to mount surprise attacks on their opponents and allow them a quick retreat if needed. The Boer commando at Bronkhorstspruit is estimated by modern historians to have contained 200–300 men, though contemporary British reports often exaggerated that figure; an article appearing in The Daily Telegraph in March 1881 for example, reported the force to number between 1200 and 1500.

== Battle ==
The two Boer forces rendezvoused during the morning of the 20th and waited for the British column. Once their scouts reported that the column had been sighted, they moved into a valley to the south of the road the British were travelling along and spread out into a skirmish line. They were hidden from the road by a shallow ridge, but there was only sparse cover provided by thin thorn bushes. Around midday, one of the advance British scouts, riding around 400 yards (400 m) ahead of Anstruther and the column, thought he spotted a group of Boers moving to a farmhouse off the road. Anstruther looked through his own binoculars and dismissed the scout's concern, suggesting it had probably just been some cattle. The column resumed its travel until it was about 1 mile (1.6 km) from the Bronkhorstspruit river, when the sight of around 150 Boers arrayed on their left flank caused the band to stop playing. Anstruther rode back to the column, where he ordered a halt, for the wagons to close up, and for his soldiers to prepare. While he did so, a Boer rider, Paul de Beer, approached under a flag of truce, and Anstruther with two of his officers walked out to meet him. The messenger, who spoke English, presented Anstruther with a letter from the Boer leaders in Heidelberg, instructing him to "stop where you are" and stating that any further movement towards Pretoria would be interpreted as a "declaration of war, the responsibility whereof we put on your shoulders." Laband records that de Beer told Anstruther he had five minutes to respond; Duxbury suggests it was only two minutes. Anstruther replied that his orders were to continue to Pretoria, and that was what he was going to do, but that he did not want a confrontation. De Beer pressed Anstruther directly, twice asking if he wanted war or peace, to which Anstruther repeated that he intended to continue his journey.

While this discussion had been happening, the 200–300 Boers had closed to within 160–220 yards (150–200 m) of the British column. De Beer rode back to the Boer commando, but before he could locate Joubert, one of the other Boer leaders, Smit, ordered the attack. The main body of the Boers galloped towards the road and jumped to the ground. They spread themselves out behind any cover available and opened fire. The close-range attack was highly effective; the British were generally in close formation and had not taken cover behind the wagons. The Boers targeted the officers and NCOs first, and sustained rifle fire pinned the British down. As many of the column were either unarmed, such as the band, or carrying insufficient ammunition, this left them unable to effectively respond to the attack. The return shots that they did fire typically went high, over the heads of the Boers, which contemporary reports on both sides attributed to the British having their sights set to the wrong distance. Within 15 minutes, all the British officers were either killed or seriously wounded, including Anstruther, who received five wounds to the legs. Seeing that their situation was lost, Anstruther ordered his men to surrender to prevent further loss of life.

Both Laband and Duxbury settle on 157 British casualties; Laband gives 5 officers and 63 men killed, 4 officers and 85 men wounded; Duxbury suggests 77 killed and a further 80 wounded. The Boers, in comparison, suffered only light casualties; 1 or 2 killed and 4 or 5 others wounded. There is no record of casualty figures for the native African wagoneers; Duxbury supposes that some of them must have been killed and injured, but says that the only mention of them is from a single Boer report, "which says that they ran off as fast as they could."

== Aftermath ==
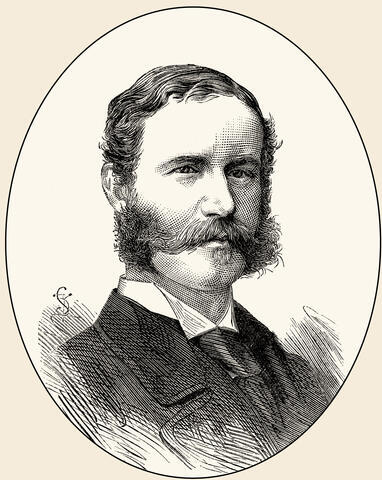
Portrait of the British lieutenant colonel Philip Robert Anstruther

The Boers looted as much as they could from the British; weapons, ammunition, clothing, wagons and horses, but left tents, blankets and rations for the British to establish a camp for their wounded. Twenty of the unwounded British soldiers were allowed to remain to tend to the wounded, and two were allowed to travel to Pretoria to bring back British medical assistance. One of these, Conductor Egerton, smuggled the British colours from the battle; they had been hidden on one of the stretchers under the wounded Mrs Fox, and he then wrapped them around his body to get them to Pretoria. The rest of the unwounded soldiers were taken to Heidelberg as prisoners. The three British women present, Mrs Fox, Mrs Maistré and Mrs Smith, were all subsequently awarded the Royal Red Cross for tending to the wounded during the battle. Having had one of his legs amputated, Anstruther died from his wounds on 26 December. In January, those who had not recovered were evacuated to Pretoria for further care, and around 30 of those who had recovered were taken as additional prisoners by the Boers. Most of the prisoners were later released on parole, under the condition that they left the South African Republic (Transvaal).

The battle of Bronkhorstspruit was the first military action of the First Boer War, and was a morale-boosting victory for the Boers. In contrast, for the British, who had been dismissive of the military effectiveness of the Boers before the battle, it was a humbling experience. To deflect from the scale of the loss, senior British officers both criticised the Boers for advancing on the British column under a white flag, and placed the blame on Anstruther, citing his "neglect" and "absence of caution". Despite this, Major-General Sir George Pomeroy Colley, the British Army's commander-in-chief in Transvaal and Natal, acknowledged in a despatch to the British government that: "This will materially alter situation, as encouraging Boers, who will now also feel themselves committed."

The Boers besieged several towns over the next month, and engaged in three significant battles during January and February 1881; at Laing's Nek, Schuinshoogte (Ingogo) and Majuba Hill. The Boers won each, and after the death of Colley in the last, the British government signed the Pretoria Convention, granting Transvaal self-government under British suzerainty, effectively reinstating the South African Republic. Tensions between the British and the Boers never faded and, in 1899, conflict broke out again with the start of the Second Boer War.

== Notes, citations and sources ==
=== Sources ===
==== Books and journals ====
- Barthorp, Michael (1991). The Anglo-Boer Wars: the British and the Afrikaners, 1815–1902. Poole, England: Blandford Press. ISBN 0-7137-2131-6.
- Burnett, Andrew (2022). The Dutch Rediscover the Dutch-Africans (1847–1900). European Expansion and Indigenous Response. Vol. 39. Leiden; Boston: Brill. doi:10.1163/9789004521254. ISBN 978-90-04-52125-4.
- Castle, Ian (1996). Majuba 1881: The Hill of Destiny. Campaign. Oxford, England: Osprey Publishing. ISBN 1-85532-503-9.
- Duxbury, G. R. (December 1980). "The Battle of Bronkhorstspruit 20 December 1880". Military History Journal. 5 (2). South African Military History Society. ISSN 0026-4016.
- Fremont-Barnes, Gregory (2003). The Boer War: 1899–1902. Essential Histories. Oxford, England: Osprey Publishing. ISBN 1-84176-396-9.
- Laband, John (2005). The Transvaal Rebellion: The First Boer War, 1880–1881. Harlow, England: Pearson Education. ISBN 0-582-77261-3.
- Laband, John (2021). "The First Anglo-Boer War, 1880–1881". In Miller, Stephen M. (ed.). Queen Victoria's Wars: British Military Campaigns, 1857–1902. Cambridge, England: Cambridge University Press. pp. 167–186. ISBN 978-1-108-49012-2.
- Lehmann, Joseph (1985) [1972]. The First Boer War. London: Buchan & Enright. ISBN 0-907675-53-0.
- Machanik, Felix (December 1980). "Firearms and Firepower: First War of Independence, 1880–1881". Military History Journal. 5 (2). South African Military History Society. ISSN 0026-4016.
- Raugh, Harold E. (2004). The Victorians at War, 1815–1914: An Encyclopedia of British Military History. Santa Barbara, California: ABC-CLIO. ISBN 978-1-57607-925-6.
- Saks, David (December 2006). "Tragic Failure: The last campaign of Maj-Gen George Pomeroy Colley". Military History Journal. 13 (6). South African Military History Society. ISSN 0026-4016.
- Spiers, Edward M. (2004). The Victorian soldier in Africa. Studies in Imperialism. Manchester, England: Manchester University Press. ISBN 0-7190-6121-0. JSTOR j.ctt155jj67.
- von der Heyde, Nicki (2017). Guide to Sieges of South Africa. Century City, South Africa: Struik Travel & Heritage. ISBN 978-1-77584-203-3.

==== News and webpages ====
- "First Anglo Boer War". South African History Online (SAHO). 1 October 2020.
- "Letters from Pretoria. Our Besieged Garrisons". The Daily Telegraph. London. 3 March 1881. p. 7 – via Newspapers.com.
- "The Disaster in the Transvaal". The Times. London. 25 December 1880. p. 5 – via Gale.
