= Thomas Flawn =

Recipient of the Victoria Cross

- Born: 22 December 1857; Irthlingborough, Northamptonshire
- Died: 19 January 1925 (aged 67); Plumstead, London
- Burial place: Plumstead Cemetery, London
- Military career
- Allegiance: United Kingdom
- Branch: British Army
- Rank: Private
- Units: 25th Regiment of Foot; 94th Regiment of Foot
- Conflicts: Anglo-Zulu War; Sekhukhune Campaign
- Awards: Victoria Cross

Thomas Flawn VC (22 December 1857 – 19 January 1925) was an English recipient of the Victoria Cross, the highest and most prestigious award for gallantry in the face of the enemy that can be awarded to British and Commonwealth forces.

== Details ==
Flawn was 21 years old, and a private in the 94th Regiment of Foot (later the Connaught Rangers), British Army during the campaign against Sekukuni, when the following deed took place for which he was awarded the VC.

On 28 November 1879 during an attack on Sekukuni's Town, South Africa, Private Flawn and another private (Francis Fitzpatrick) with six men of the Native Contingent, were with a lieutenant of the 1st Dragoon Guards when he was badly wounded. The natives carried the wounded officer at first, but when the party was pursued by about 30 of the enemy they deserted and the lieutenant would have been killed but for the gallantry of the two privates – who alternately carried him while the other covered the retreat by firing on the enemy.
