= First Boer War =

1880–1881 war in South Africa

- Part of the Boer Wars
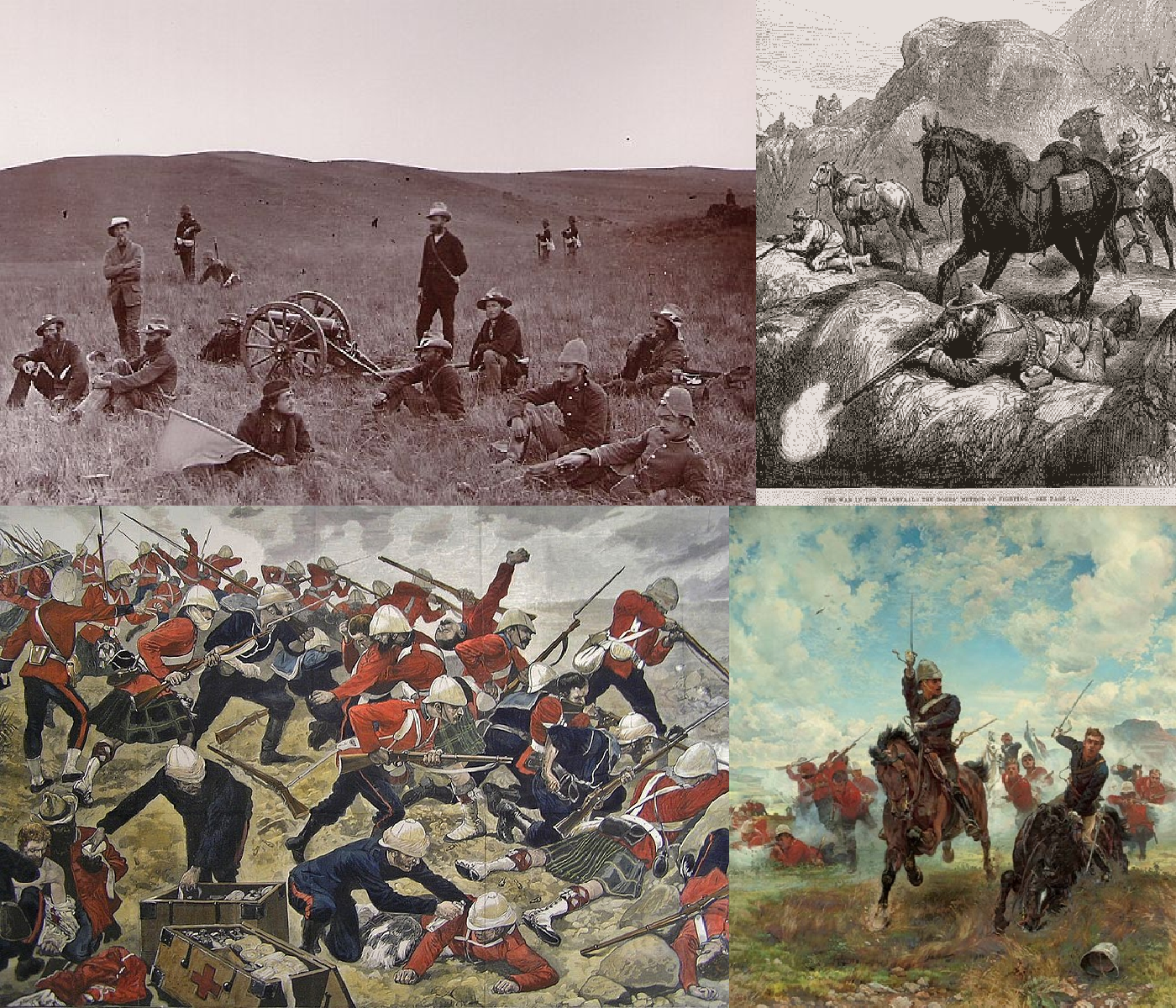
- "Clockwise from left: Aftermath of the Battle of Elandsfontein, The Boers' method of fighting" in The Illustrated London News; British Cavalry charges during the Battle of Laing's Nek"; British in action during the Battle of Majuba Hill
Date	20 December 1880 – 23 March 1881 (3 months and 3 days)
Location	South African Republic
Result	Boer victory

Belligerents
South African Republic	British Empire

Commanders and leaders
Piet Joubert; Frans Joubert; Piet Cronjé	William Gladstone; George Colley †

Strength
3,000 (about 7,000 in total)	1,200 Natal Field Force (1,700 in Transvaal)

Casualties and losses
43 killed 58 wounded	409 killed 359 wounded 63 captured

The First Boer War (Afrikaans: Eerste Vryheidsoorlog, lit. 'First Freedom War'), also known as the Transvaal War, was fought from 16 December 1880 until 23 March 1881 between the United Kingdom and Boers of the Transvaal (as the South African Republic was known while under British administration). The war resulted in a Boer victory and eventual independence of the South African Republic. The war is also known as the First Anglo–Boer War, the Transvaal War or the Transvaal Rebellion.

== Background ==
In the 19th century, Britain at some times attempted to set up a single unified state in southern Africa, and at other times wanted to control less territory. The British Empire's expansion in South Africa was accelerated due to the desire to control trade routes between India via the Cape of Good Hope, the discovery of diamonds in Kimberley in 1867, and the race against other European powers to control as much of Africa as possible.

The British annexation of the Transvaal in 1877 represented one of their biggest incursions into southern Africa, but other expansions also occurred. In 1868 the United Kingdom annexed Basutoland (modern Lesotho in the Drakensberg mountains, surrounded by the Cape Colony, the Orange Free State and Natal), following an appeal from Moshoeshoe, the leader of a mixed group of mostly Sotho-speaking refugees from the Difaqane who sought British protection from both the Boers and the Zulus. In the 1880s, the Tswana country became an object of dispute between the Germans to the west, the Boers to the east, and the British in the Cape Colony to the south. Although the Tswana country had at the time almost no economic value, the "Missionaries Road" passed through it toward territory farther north. (Note: The "Missionaries Road" stretched from Kuruman, through Shoshong, now in Botswana, to Bulawayo and Zimbabwe, and was used by Scottish missionaries in particular to access the interior of Africa.) After the Germans annexed Damaraland and Namaqualand (modern Namibia) in 1884, the British annexed Bechuanaland in two parts in 1885: the Bechuanaland Protectorate (modern Botswana) and British Bechuanaland (later part of the Cape Colony).

Following the Battle of Blaauwberg (1806), Britain had formally acquired the Cape of Good Hope in South Africa from the Dutch in 1814 after the Napoleonic Wars. Certain groups of Dutch-speaking settler farmers (Boers) resented British rule, even though British control brought some economic benefits. Successive waves of migrations of Boer farmers (known as Trekboers which literally means "travelling farmers"), probed first east along the coast away from the Cape toward Natal, and thereafter north toward the interior, eventually establishing the republics that came to be known as the Orange Free State and the Transvaal (literally "across/beyond the Vaal River").

The British did not try to stop the Trekboers from moving away from the Cape. The Trekboers functioned as pioneers, opening up the interior for those who followed, and Britain gradually extended control outwards from the Cape along the coast toward the east, eventually annexing Natal in 1843.

The Trekboers were farmers, gradually extending their range and territory with no overall agenda. The formal abolition of slavery in the British Empire in 1834 led to more organised groups of Boer settlers attempting to escape British rule, some travelling as far north as modern-day Mozambique. This became known as the Great Trek, and those who took part in it are called Voortrekkers.

Indeed, the British subsequently acknowledged two new Boer Republics in a pair of treaties: the Sand River Convention of 1852 recognised the independence of the Transvaal Republic, and the Orange River Convention of 1854 recognised the independence of the Orange Free State. However, British colonial expansion, from the 1830s, featured skirmishes and wars against both Boers and native African tribes for most of the remainder of the century.

The discovery of diamonds in 1867 near the Vaal River, some 550 miles (890 km) northeast of Cape Town, ended the isolation of the Boers in the interior and changed South African history. The discovery triggered a diamond rush that attracted people from all over the world, turning Kimberley into a town of 50,000 within five years and drawing the attention of British imperial interests. In the 1870s the British annexed Griqualand West, site of the Kimberley diamond discoveries.

In 1875 Henry Herbert, 4th Earl of Carnarvon, the British Secretary of State for the Colonies, in an attempt to extend British influence, approached the Orange Free State and the Transvaal Republic and tried to organise a federation of the British and Boer territories modelled on the 1867 federation of the French and English speaking provinces of Canada. However the cultural and historical context differed entirely, and the Boer leaders turned him down. Successive British annexations, and in particular the annexation of West Griqualand, caused a climate of simmering unease in the Boer republics. The president of the Transvaal Republic from 1872 to 1877 was T. F. Burgers. The Transvaal Republic was in serious financial trouble because of problems with tax collection and a war with the Pedi under the leadership of Sekhukhune in the North-East Transvaal. In 1877, the British annexed the Transvaal, which was bankrupt, and under threat from the Zulu.

Sir Theophilus Shepstone was sent by Lord Carnarvon as a special commissioner to the Transvaal. Shepstone did not initially disclose his true intentions to the Transvaal government, but at the end of January 1877 Shepstone admitted to Burgers that Britain was going to annex the Transvaal Republic. Burgers' response was to convince the Transvaal government to act in a more serious manner, but the Transvaal government refused to see the urgency of their predicament. Lord Carnarvon thought that the annexation of the Transvaal would be the first step in creating a confederation under British authority.

On 12 April 1877, a proclamation of the annexation of the Transvaal Republic was made in Church Square, Pretoria, the capital city of the Transvaal. The Transvaal Republic was now known as the British Colony of the Transvaal. A Transvaal government delegation comprising Paul Kruger and E. J. P. Jorrisen went to London in 1877 to present their case on behalf of the Transvaal to Lord Carnarvon, but their efforts were unsuccessful. The Transvaal Volksraad (People's Council) asked Transvaal citizens not to commit acts of violence, as this would create a negative image of the Transvaal in Britain. In April 1880, the Liberal Party was elected as the new government in Britain, and the feeling in the Transvaal was that this would lead to the return of sovereignty to the Transvaal. However, the new British prime minister, W.E. Gladstone, reiterated British control. In October 1880, a newspaper from Paarl in the Cape Colony reported: "Passive resistance is now becoming futile".

== Outbreak of war ==
With the defeat of the Zulus, and the Pedi, the Transvaal Boers were able to give voice to the growing resentment against the 1877 British annexation of the Transvaal and complained that it had been a violation of the Sand River Convention of 1852, and the Bloemfontein Convention of 1854.

Major-General Sir George Pomeroy Colley, after returning briefly to India, finally took over as Governor of Natal, Transvaal and Military Commander in July 1880. Multiple commitments prevented Colley from visiting the Transvaal where he knew many of the senior Boers. Instead he relied on reports from the Administrator, Sir Owen Lanyon, who had no understanding of the Boer mood or capability. Belatedly Lanyon asked for troop reinforcements in December 1880 but was overtaken by events.

The Boers revolted on 16 December 1880 and took action at Bronkhorstspruit against a British column of the 94th Foot who were returning to reinforce Pretoria.

== 1880–1881 war ==
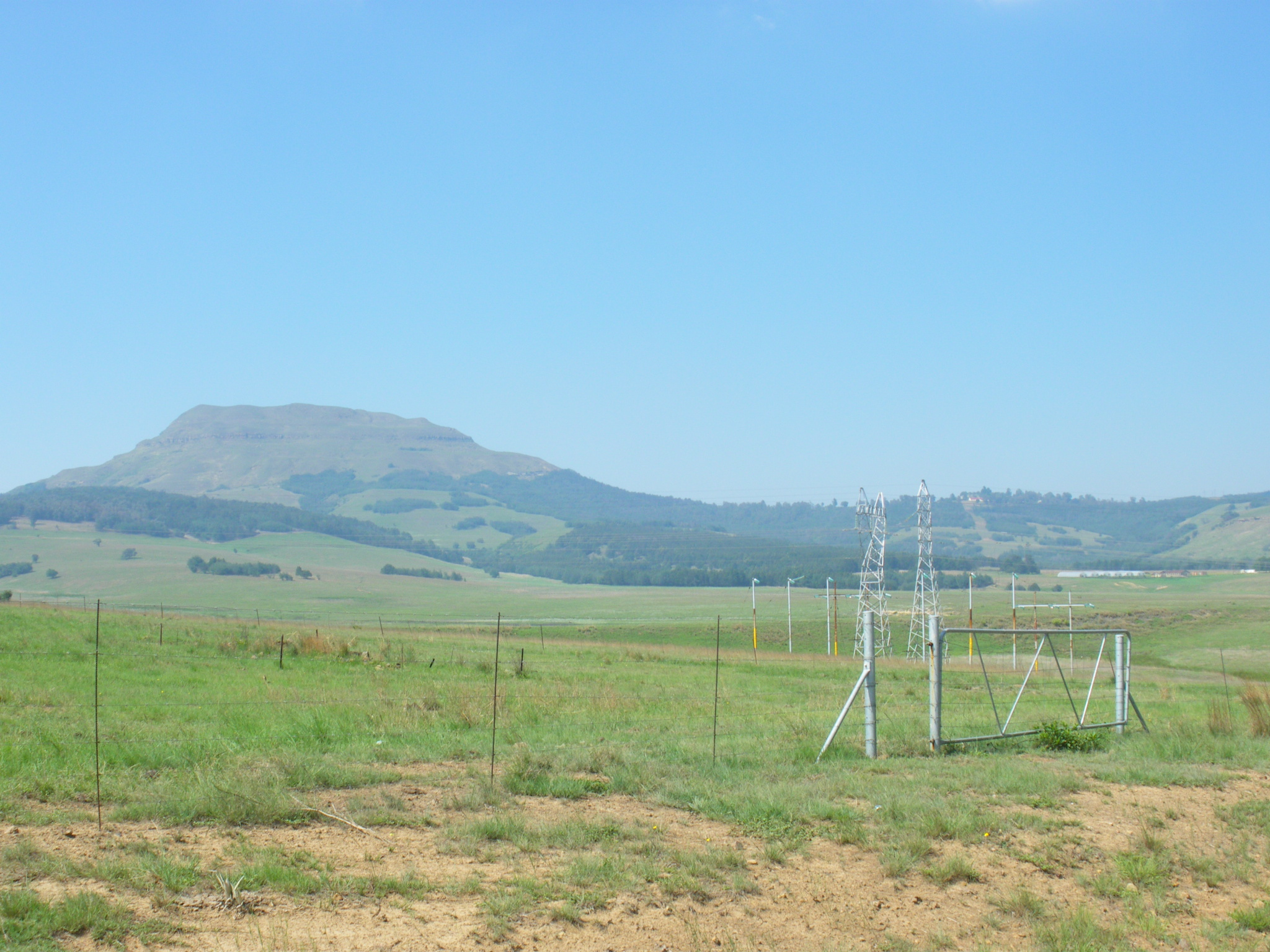
Majuba Hill as seen from Laing's Nek, where two decisive battles were fought between the British and Boer forces in the First Boer War

The trigger for the war came when a Boer named Piet Bezuidenhout (see Gerhardminnebron) refused to pay an illegally inflated tax. Government officials seized his wagon and attempted to auction it off to pay the tax on 11 November 1880, but a hundred armed Boers disrupted the auction, assaulted the presiding sheriff, and reclaimed the wagon. The first shots of the war were fired when this group fought back against government troops who were sent after them.

After the Transvaal formally declared independence from the United Kingdom, the war began on 16 December 1880 with shots fired by Transvaal Boers at Potchefstroom. During this skirmish, the Boer "commando" was led by General Piet Cronjé. This led to the action at Bronkhorstspruit on 20 December 1880, where the Boers ambushed and destroyed a British Army convoy. From 22 December 1880 to 6 January 1881, British Army garrisons all over the Transvaal became besieged.

Although generally called a war, the actual engagements were of a relatively minor nature considering the few men involved on both sides and the short duration of the combat, lasting some ten weeks.

The fiercely independent Boers had no regular army; when danger threatened, all the men in a district would form a militia organised into military units called commandos and would elect officers. Commandos being civilian militia, each man wore what he wished, usually everyday dark-grey, neutral-coloured, or earthtone khaki farming clothes such as a jacket, trousers and slouch hat. Each man brought his own weapon, usually a hunting rifle, and his own horses. The average Boer citizens who made up their commandos were farmers who had spent almost all their working lives in the saddle, and, because they had to depend on both their horses and their rifles for almost all of their meat, they were skilled hunters and expert marksmen.

Most of the Boers had single-shot breech-loading rifle, primarily the .450 Westley Richards, a falling-block, single-action, breech-loading rifle, with accuracy up to 600 yards.

J. Lehmann's The First Boer War, 1972, comments "Employing chiefly the very fine breech-loading Westley Richards - calibre 45; paper cartridge; percussion-cap replaced on the nipple manually - they made it exceedingly dangerous for the British to expose themselves on the skyline". Other rifles included the Martini-Henry and the Snider–Enfield. Only a few had repeaters like the Winchester or the Swiss Vetterli. As hunters they had learned to fire from cover, from a prone position and to make the first shot count, knowing that if they missed, in the time it took to reload, the game would be long gone. At community gatherings, they often held target shooting competitions using targets such as hens' eggs perched on posts over 100 yards away. The Boer commandos made for expert light cavalry, able to use every scrap of cover from which they could pour accurate and destructive fire at the British.

The British infantry uniforms at that date were red jackets, dark blue trousers with red piping on the side, white pith helmets and pipe clayed equipment, a stark contrast to the African landscape. The Highlanders wore the kilt, and khaki uniforms (They had just been involved in the Second Afghan War). The standard infantry weapon was the Martini-Henry single-shot breech-loading rifle with a long sword bayonet. Gunners of the Royal Artillery wore blue jackets. The Boer marksmen could easily snipe at British troops from a distance. The Boers carried no bayonets, leaving them at a substantial disadvantage in close combat, which they avoided as often as possible. Drawing on years of experience of fighting frontier skirmishes with numerous and indigenous African tribes, they relied more on mobility, stealth, marksmanship and initiative while the British emphasised the traditional military values of command, discipline, formation and synchronised firepower. The average British soldier was not trained to be a marksman and got little target practice. What shooting training British soldiers had was mainly as a unit firing in volleys on command.

=== Action at Bronkhorstspruit ===
On 20 December 1880, Lieutenant-Colonel Philip Robert Anstruther and men of the 94th Foot (Connaught Rangers) were on their way to quell the Boer uprising in Pretoria, when they were ambushed by Boer Forces near the Bronkhorstspruit Stream. This mainly Irish regiment was marching westward toward Pretoria, led by Lieutenant-Colonel Anstruther, when halted by a Boer commando group as they approached the Bronkhorstspruit, 38 miles from Pretoria. The Boer leader, Commandant Frans Joubert (brother of General Piet Joubert), demanded that Anstruther and the column turn back, stating that the territory was now again a Boer Republic and therefore any further advance by the British would be deemed an act of war. Anstruther refused and ordered that ammunition be distributed, and the Boers opened fire: about 120 soldiers were killed or wounded within minutes of the first shots, with total losses 56 men dead and 92 wounded. Boer casualties totalled two killed and five wounded. With the majority of his troops dead or wounded, the dying Anstruther ordered surrender.

The Boer uprising caught the six small British forts scattered around the Transvaal by surprise. They housed some 2,000 troops between them, including irregulars with as few as fifty soldiers at Lydenburg in the east which Anstruther had just left. Being isolated, and with so few men, all the forts could do was prepare for a siege and wait to be relieved. By 6 January 1881, Boers had begun to besiege Lydenburg. The other five forts, with a minimum of fifty miles between any two, were at Wakkerstroom and Standerton in the south, Marabastad in the north and Potchefstroom and Rustenburg in the west. Boers begun to besiege Marabastad fort on 29 December 1880.

The three main engagements of the war were all within about sixteen miles of each other, centred on the Battles of Laing's Nek (28 January 1881), Ingogo River (8 February 1881) and the rout at Majuba Hill (27 February 1881). These battles were the result of Colley's attempts to relieve the besieged forts. Although he had requested reinforcements, these would not reach him until mid-February. Colley was, however, convinced that the garrisons would not survive until then. Consequently, at Newcastle, near the Transvaal border, he mustered a relief column (the Natal Field Force) of available men, although this amounted to only 1,200 troops. Colley's force was further weakened in that few were mounted, a serious disadvantage in the terrain and for that type of warfare. Most Boers were mounted and good riders. Nonetheless, Colley's force set out on 24 January 1881 northward for Laing's Nek en route to relieve Wakkerstroom and Standerton, the nearest forts.

=== Laing's Nek ===
In a display of diplomacy before the beginning of the Battle, British commander Sir George Pomeroy Colley sent a message on 23 January 1881 to the Commandant-General of the Boers, Piet Joubert, calling on him to disband his forces or face the full might of Imperial Britain. He wrote "The men who follow you are, many of them ignorant, and know and understood a little of anything outside their own country. But you, who are well educated and have travelled, cannot but be unaware how hopeless is the struggle you have embarked upon, and how little any accidental success gained can affect the ultimate result".

Without waiting for a reply, Colley led his Natal Field Force – consisting of 1,400 men, an 80-strong Naval brigade, artillery and Gatling guns – to a strategic pass in the hills on the Natal-Transvaal border called Laing's Nek. At the battle of Laing's Nek on 28 January 1881, the Natal Field Force under Colley attempted with cavalry and infantry attacks to break through the Boer positions on the Drakensberg mountain range to relieve their garrisons. The British were repelled with heavy losses by the Boers under the command of Joubert. 480 British troops were engaged, suffering 150 casualties. Furthermore, sharpshooting Boers had killed or wounded many senior officers.

=== Schuinshoogte ===
At the Battle of Schuinshoogte (also known as Battle of the Carrots) on 8 February 1881, another British force barely escaped destruction. General Colley had sought refuge with the Natal Field Force at Mount Prospect, three miles to the south, to await reinforcements. However, Colley was soon back in action. On 7 February, a mail escort on its way to Newcastle had been attacked by the Boers and forced back to Mount Prospect. The next day Colley, determined to keep his supplies and communication route open, escorted the mail wagon personally and this time with a larger escort. The Boers attacked the convoy at the Ingogo River crossing, but with a stronger force of some 400 men. The firepower was not matched and the fight continued for several hours, but the Boer marksmen dominated the action until darkness when a storm permitted Colley and the remainder of his troops to retreat back to Mount Prospect. In this engagement, the British lost 139 officers and troops, half the original force that had set out to escort the mail convoy.

Colley had been forced to leave behind many of the wounded to die of exposure. In the space of ten days, he had lost one-quarter of his field force, either dead or wounded. "One or two Pyrrhic victories like this and we shan't have an army left at all", Lieutenant Percival Marling wrote at the time.

On 12 February, Colley received reinforcements consisting of the 92nd (Gordon Highlanders) Regiment of Foot, and the 15th (The King's Hussar's), with the 6th (Inniskilling) Dragoons, the 83rd (County of Dublin) Regiment under the command of Sir Evelyn Wood, on the way.

On 14 February hostilities were suspended, awaiting the outcome of peace negotiations initiated by an offer from Paul Kruger. During this time, Colley's promised reinforcements arrived, with more to follow. The British government in the meantime had offered a Royal commission investigation and possible troop withdrawal and their attitude toward the Boers was conciliatory. Colley was critical of this stance and, while waiting for Kruger's final agreement, decided to attack again with a view to enabling the British government to negotiate from a position of strength. This resulted in the disaster of the Battle of Majuba Hill on 27 February 1881, the greatest defeat for the British. The British, though they had the superior numbers, were slaughtered.

=== Majuba Hill ===
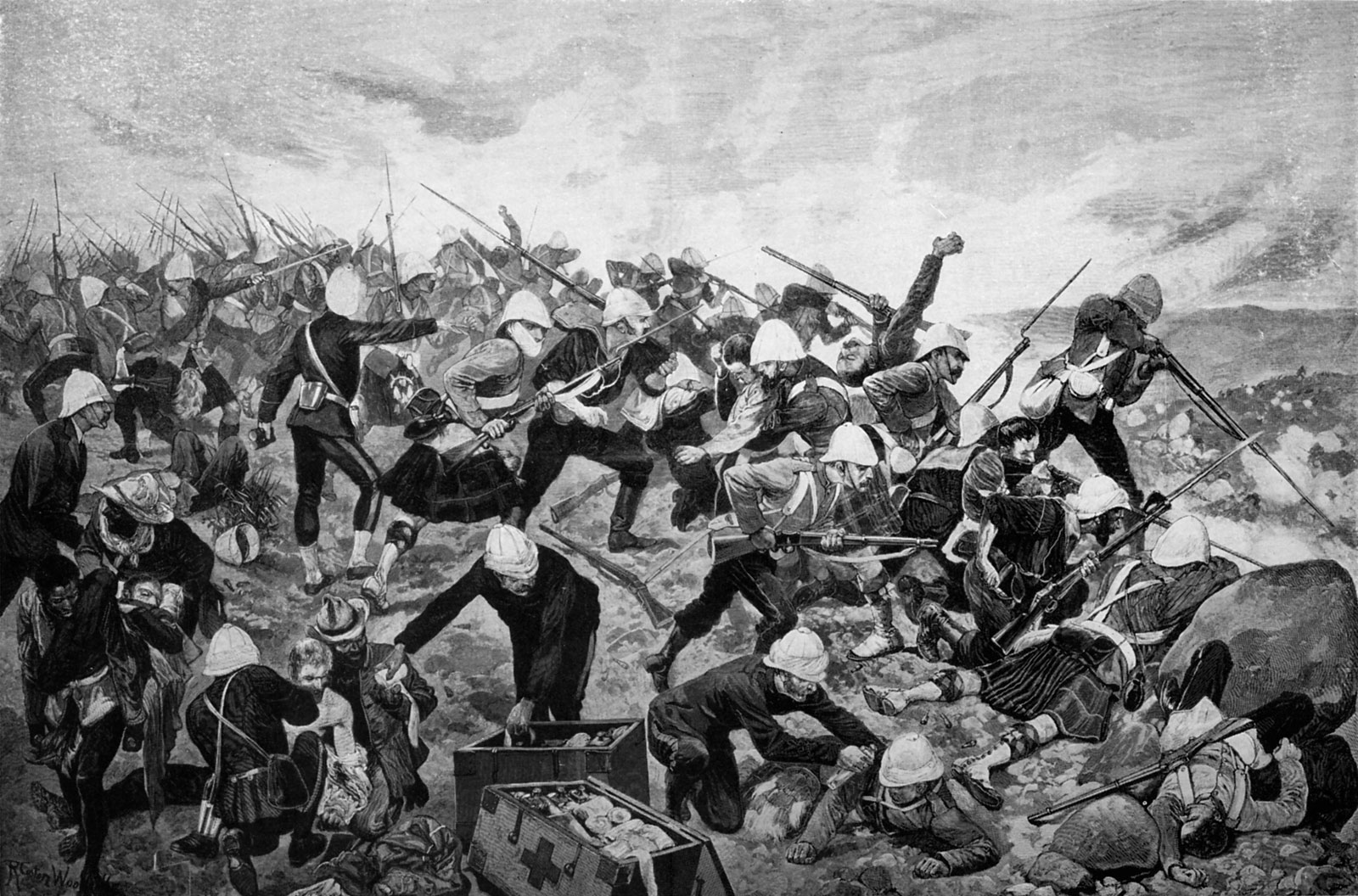
Battle of Majuba

On 26 February 1881, Colley led a night march of some 400 men from the 92nd Highlanders, the 58th Regiment, and the Natal Brigade. They reached the top of Majuba Hill, which overlooked the main Boer position. The troops took no artillery with them. At first light, a group of Highlanders advertised their presence by standing on the skyline, shaking their fists, and yelling at the Boers below. The Boers saw the British occupying the summit and stormed the mountain using dead ground. Shooting accurately and using all available natural cover, the Boers advanced toward the British position. Several Boer groups stormed the hill and drove the British off. As panic took hold, terrified British soldiers sprinted for the rear, then fled down the hillside.

The British suffered heavy losses, with 92 killed, 134 injured, and 59 men taken prisoner. Major-General Colley was among the dead; he was fatally shot in the head when trying to rally his men. Of the Boers, six were wounded, one fatally. Within 30 minutes the British were swept off the summit.

For the British the shame of Majuba was even more intense than that of Isandlwana. Elite units like the 92nd Highlanders had cut and run in the face of Boer irregulars. This defeat had such an impact that during the Second Boer War, one of the British slogans was "Remember Majuba".

Hostilities continued until 6 March 1881, when a truce was declared, on the same terms that Colley had disparaged. The Transvaal forts had endured, contrary to Colley's forecast, with the sieges being generally uneventful, the Boers content to wait for hunger and sickness to take their toll. The forts had suffered only light casualties as an outcome of sporadic engagements, except at Potchefstroom, where twenty-four were killed, and seventeen at Pretoria, in each case resulting from occasional raids on Boer positions.

=== Outcome and impact ===
Although the Boers exploited their advantages to the full, their unconventional tactics, marksmanship and mobility do not fully explain the heavy British losses. Like the Boers, British soldiers were equipped with breech-loading rifles (the Martini-Henry), but they (unlike the Boers) were professionals, and the British Army had previously fought campaigns in difficult terrain and against an elusive enemy, such as the tribesmen of Afghanistan. Historians lay much of the blame at the feet of the British command, in particular Major-General Sir George Pomeroy Colley, although poor intelligence and bad communications also contributed to their losses. At Laing's Nek it seems that Colley not only underestimated the Boer capabilities, but had been misinformed of, and was surprised by, the strength of the Boer forces. The confrontation at Ingogo Nek was perhaps rash, given that reserves were being sent, and Colley had by then experienced the Boer strength and capabilities. Indeed, strategists have speculated as to whether the convoy should have proceeded at all when it was known to be vulnerable to attack, and whether it was necessary for Colley himself to take command of the British guard.

Colley's decision to initiate the attack at Majuba Hill when truce discussions were already underway appears to have been foolhardy, particularly as there was limited strategic value. The Boer positions were also out of rifle range from the summit. Once the Battle of Majuba Hill had begun, Colley's command and understanding of the dire situation seemed to deteriorate as the day went on, as he sent conflicting signals to the British forces at Mount Prospect by heliograph, first requesting reinforcements and then stating that the Boers were retreating. Thus poor leadership, intelligence and communications resulted in the deaths of many British soldiers and Colley himself.

The First Boer War was the first conflict since the American War of Independence in which the British had been decisively defeated and forced to sign a peace treaty under unfavourable terms. The Battle of Laing's Nek would be the last occasion when a British regiment carried its official regimental colours into battle.

== 1881 peace ==
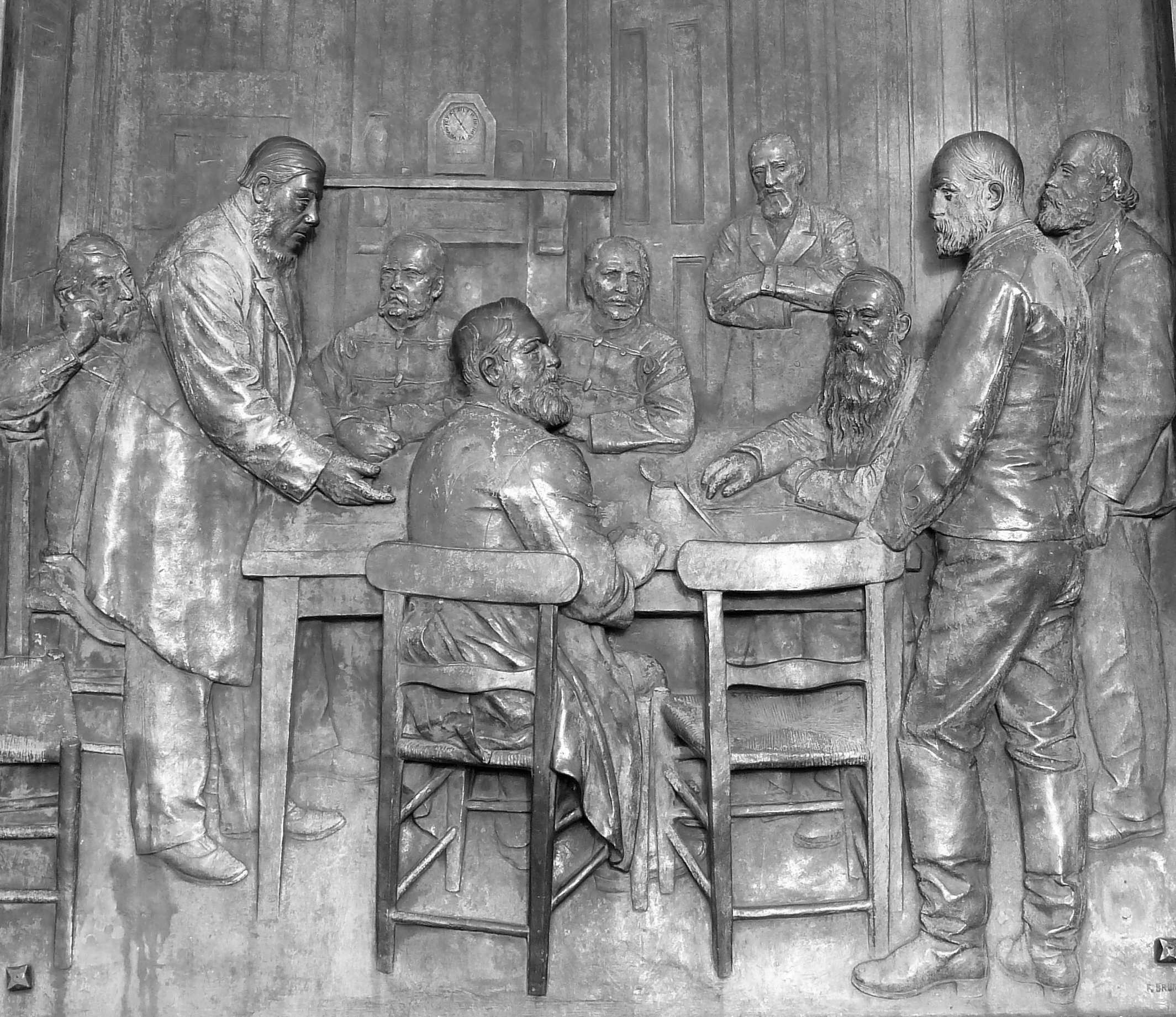
Peace talks between Paul Kruger and Sir Evelyn Wood in O'Neil's Cottage near Amajuba Hill

The British government under Gladstone was conciliatory since it realised that any further action would require substantial troop reinforcements, and it was likely that the war would be costly, messy and protracted. Unwilling to get bogged down in a distant war, the British government ordered a truce.

Sir Evelyn Wood (Colley's replacement) signed an armistice to end the war on 6 March, and subsequently a peace treaty was signed with Kruger at O'Neil's Cottage on 23 March 1881, bringing the war to an official end. In the final peace treaty, the Pretoria Convention, negotiated by a three-man Royal Commission, the British agreed to complete Boer self-government in the Transvaal under British suzerainty. The Boers accepted the Queen's nominal rule and British control over external relations, African affairs, and native districts.

The Pretoria Convention was signed on 3 August 1881 and ratified on 25 October by the Transvaal Volksraad (parliament). The agreement did not reinstate fully the independence of the Transvaal but kept the state under British suzerainty. British troops withdrew and in 1884, the Pretoria Convention was superseded by the London Convention, which provided for full independence and self-government although still with British control of foreign relations.

== Aftermath ==
When in 1886 a second major mineral find was made at an outcrop on a large ridge some 30 miles (48 km) south of the Boer capital at Pretoria, it reignited British imperial interests. The ridge, known locally as the "Witwatersrand" (literally "white water ridge" – a watershed), contained the world's largest deposit of gold-bearing ore. This discovery made the Transvaal, which had been a struggling Boer republic, potentially a political and economic threat to British supremacy in South Africa at a time when Britain was engaged in the scramble for African colonies with France and Germany.

In 1896, Cecil Rhodes, Prime Minister of the Cape Colony, attempted to overthrow the government of Paul Kruger who was then president of the South African Republic or the Transvaal. The raid, known as Jameson Raid, failed.

By 1899, tensions erupted into the Second Boer War, caused partly by the rejection of an ultimatum by the British. The Transvaal ultimatum had demanded that all disputes between the Orange Free State and the Transvaal (allied since 1897) be settled by arbitration and that British troops should leave. The lure of gold made it worth committing the vast resources of the British Empire and incurring the huge costs required to win that war. However, the sharp lessons the British had learned during the First Boer War – which included Boer marksmanship, tactical flexibility and good use of ground – had largely been forgotten when the second war broke out 18 years later. Heavy casualties, as well as many setbacks, were incurred before the British were ultimately victorious.

== See also ==
- Military history of South Africa
- Transvaal civil war, 1854 conflict
- Second Boer War
- South African Wars (1879–1915)
- Anglo-Zulu War
- Jameson Raid
