= 94th Regiment of Foot =

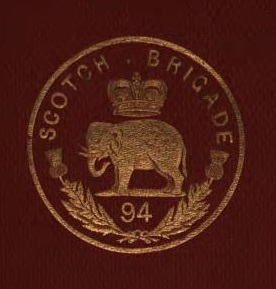
- Badge of the 94th Regiment of Foot
- Active: 1794–1818; 1823–1881
- Country: Great Britain (1794–1800); United Kingdom (1801–1881)
- Branch: British Army
- Type: Line infantry
- Role: Infantry
- Size: One battalion
- Garrison/HQ: Gough Barracks, Armagh
- Engagements: Fourth Anglo-Mysore War; Second Anglo-Maratha War; Napoleonic Wars; Mappila riots Anglo-Zulu War; Basuto Gun War; First Boer War

The 94th Regiment of Foot was a line infantry regiment of the British Army. Raised as the Scotch Brigade in October 1794, it was renumbered as the 94th Regiment of Foot in December 1802 and disbanded in December 1818. The regiment was reformed in December 1823 and served until 1881 when it amalgamated with the 88th Regiment of Foot to form the Connaught Rangers.

== History ==
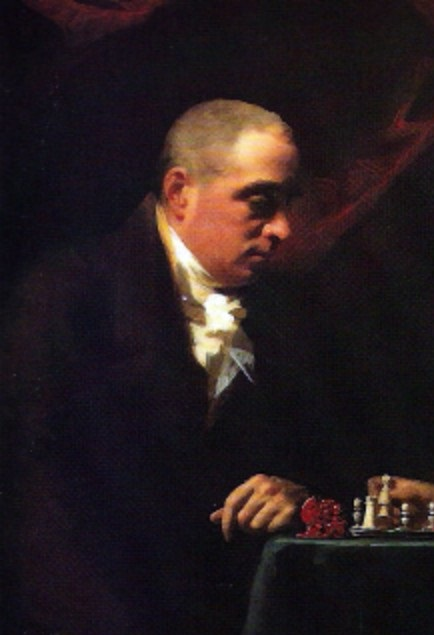
General Francis Dundas, first colonel of the regiment

=== Formation ===
The regiment was raised, from officers who had previously served in the Scots Brigade, by General Francis Dundas as the Scotch Brigade on 9 October 1794. The regiment embarked for Gibraltar in November 1795 and then moved on to South Africa in 1796 before transferring to India in late 1798. The regiment landed at Madras in January 1799 and saw action at the Battle of Mallavelly in March 1799 and the siege of Seringapatam in April 1799 during the Fourth Anglo-Mysore War. It was renumbered as the 94th Regiment of Foot in December 1802. It also took part in the Battle of Argaon in November 1803 and the Capture of Gawilghur in December 1803 during the Second Anglo-Maratha War. At Gawilghur, Captain Campbell led the light company of the regiment up the assault ladders and over the walls of the fort, which had previously been considered impregnable, and then let the rest of the British force in through the main gate. The regiment embarked for home in October 1807.

=== Napoleonic Wars ===
The regiment sailed for Jersey in April 1809 and was then embarked for Portugal in August 1809 for service in the Peninsular War. It landed in Lisbon in February 1810 and arrived to take part in the defence of Fort Matagorda a few days later. Captain Archibald Maclaine led a detachment of 155 men who held back Marshal Soult with a force of 8.000 men. Maclaine was knighted for this exploit and promoted to Major. The regiment then saw action at the Battle of Sabugal in April 1811, the Battle of Fuentes de Oñoro in May 1811 and the siege of Ciudad Rodrigo in January 1812. After that it fought at the siege of Badajoz in March 1812, the Battle of Salamanca in July 1812 and the siege of Burgos in September 1812 as well as the Battle of Vitoria in June 1813. It then pursued the French Army into France and fought at the Battle of Nivelle in November 1813, the Battle of the Nive in December 1813 and the Battle of Orthez in February 1814 as well as the Battle of Toulouse in April 1814. It embarked for Cork in May 1814 and was disbanded in Dublin in December 1818.

=== The Victorian era ===
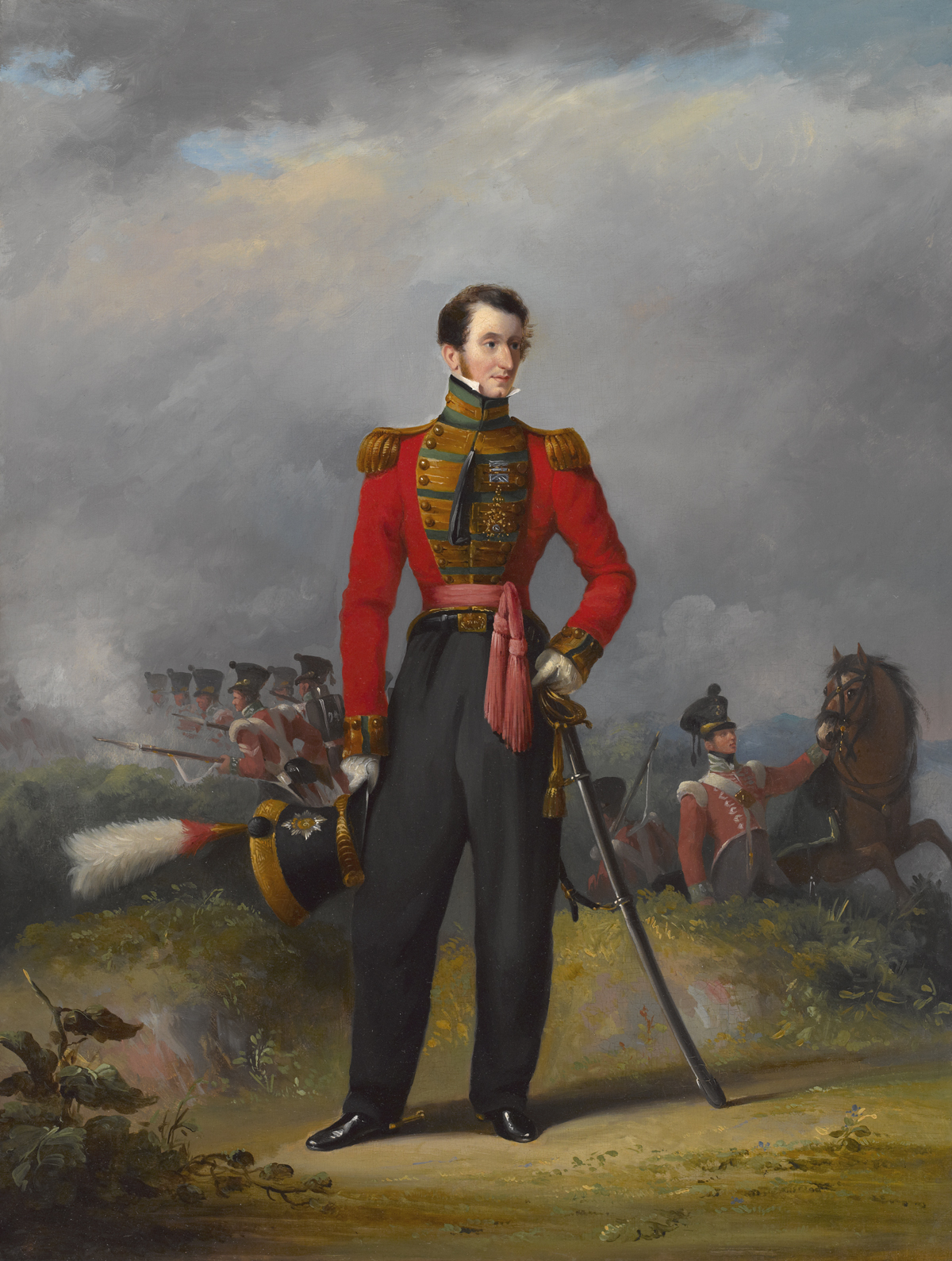
Lieutenant General Sir Thomas Bradford depicted in uniform as colonel of the regiment circa 1825

The regiment was reformed in Glasgow (and subsequently confirmed as the successor of the predecessor formation with full continuity of battle honours), (Note: Confirmation was issued by the War Office in 1875) in response to the threat posed by the French intervention in Spain, in December 1823. Of the initial appointments, two of the officers had previous service in the 94th Regiment of Foot (Major Allan and Captain Bogle). The regiment was posted to Gibraltar in April 1824 and it was presented with its new regimental colours in April 1825 before being sent to Malta in March 1832. It returned to Ireland in November 1834.

The regiment was posted to Ceylon in October 1838, then moved to Cannanore in April 1839 and served in the Madras Presidency for fifteen years during which time it saw some action suppressing the Mappila riots in summer 1849. The regiment embarked for England in March 1854.

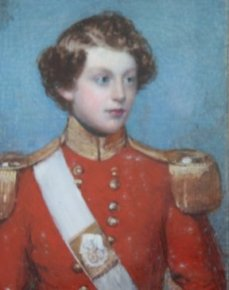
William Plummer Gaskell, an ensign in the regiment in 1854

Some volunteers departed for service in the Crimean War in November 1854 and the service companies left for Gibraltar in September 1855. The main body of the regiment embarked for Karachi in November 1857 and then transferred to Peshawar in the North-West Frontier region in October 1858. The regiment embarked for home again in January 1868.

The regiment embarked for South Africa in spring 1879 and saw action at the Battle of Ulundi in July 1879 during the Anglo-Zulu War. The regiment marched into the Transvaal and took part in the successful attack on Sekukuni's stronghold on 28 November 1879 during the Second Sekhukhune War. Two Victoria Crosses were awarded to members of the regiment for their conduct during this action.

The regiment remained in South Africa with its eight companies widely distributed throughout the Transvaal, garrisons being established in Pretoria (E and G companies), Lydenburg (A and F companies), Wakkerstroom (C company), Marabastad (B company), Standerton (H company) and Newcastle in northern Natal (D company). It was during the re-concentration of the companies, in response to outbreaks of civil disorder by the Boers, that A and F companies were attacked at Battle of Bronkhorstspruit in December 1880 in the opening clash of the First Boer War: the two companies saw 156 of their soldiers killed or wounded, with the rest taken prisoner. The other six companies of the regiment spent the war being besieged by the Boers: C, D and H in Standerton, E and G in Pretoria, B in Marabastad, and a small detachment of 50 men in Lydenburg.

As part of the Cardwell Reforms of the 1870s, where single-battalion regiments were linked together to share a single depot and recruiting district in the United Kingdom, the 94th was linked with the 89th (Princess Victoria's) Regiment of Foot and assigned to district no. 65 at Gough Barracks in Armagh. On 1 July 1881 the Childers Reforms came into effect and the regiment amalgamated with the 88th Regiment of Foot to form the Connaught Rangers.

== Battle honours ==
Battle honours won by the regiment were:

- Fourth Anglo-Mysore War : Seringapatam
- Peninsular War: Peninsular, Ciudad Rodrigo, Badajos, Salamanca, Vitorria, Nivelle, Orthes, Toulouse

== Victoria Crosses ==
- Private Francis Fitzpatrick - The Assault on King Sekhukhune’s Stronghold, 28 November 1879
- Private Thomas Flawn - The Assault on King Sekhukhune’s Stronghold, 28 November 1879

== Colonels of the Regiment ==
Colonels of the Regiment were:

Scotch Brigade

- 1794–1809: Gen. Francis Dundas

94th Regiment of Foot

- 1809–1815: Gen. Sir Rowland Hill, 1st Viscount Hill, GCB, GCH, KC
- 1815–1818: ?
- Regiment disbanded in 1818

94th Regiment of Foot

- Regiment reformed in 1823
- 1823–1829: Gen. Sir Thomas Bradford, GCB, GCH
- 1829–1831: Lt-Gen. Sir John Keane, 1st Baron Keane, GCB, GCH
- 1831–1834: Maj-Gen. Sir James Campbell, KCB, KCH
- 1834–1838: F.M. Sir John Colborne, 1st Baron Seaton, GCB, GCMG, GCH
- 1838–1847: Gen. Sir Thomas McMahon, Bt., GCB
- 1847–1853: Lt-Gen. Sir William Warre, CB
- 1853–1854: Maj-Gen. William Staveley, CB
- 1854: Lt-Gen. Henry Thomas, CB
- 1854–1855: Lt-Gen. Hon. Henry Edward Butler
- 1855–1866: Gen. George Powell Higginson
- 1866–1872: Gen. Sir Edward Walter Forestier-Walker, KCB
- 1872–1879: Gen. Henry Jervis
- 1879: Gen. Richard William Penn Curzon-Howe, 3rd Earl Howe, GCVO, CB
- 1879–1881: Gen. Sir John Thornton Grant, KCB

== Sources ==
- Castle, Ian (2005). Majuba 1881: The Hill of Destiny. Greenwood Press. ISBN 978-0275986414.
- "Historical Record of the Services of the Ninety-Fourth Regiment" in Colburn's United Service Magazine and Naval and Military Journal 1868 Part 3. Hurst and Blackett. 1868. pp. 243–257.
- "Historical Record of the Services of the Ninety-Fourth Regiment" in Colburn's United Service Magazine and Naval and Military Journal 1868 Part 3. Hurst and Blackett. 1868. pp. 562–582.
