= Lydenburg =

- Mashishing
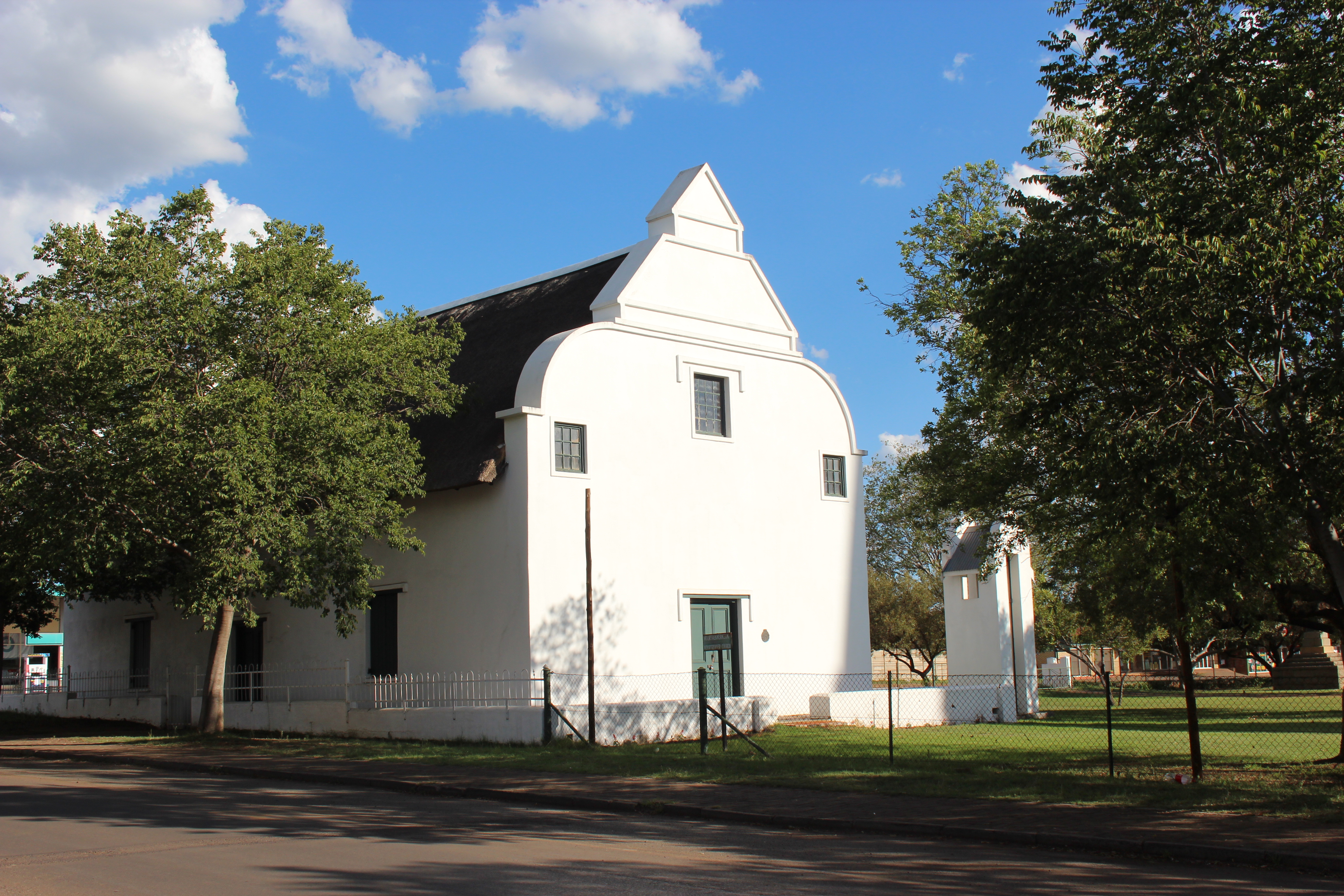
- Dutch Reformed Church, Lydenburg

- Location within Mpumalanga Location within South Africa Location within Africa
- Coordinates: 25°05′45″S 30°27′20″E
- Country: South Africa
- Province: Mpumalanga
- District: Ehlanzeni
- Municipality: Thaba Chweu

Area
  - Total: 17.31 km^{2} (6.68 sq mi)

Population (2011)
  - Total: 37,258
  - Density: 2,152/km^{2} (5,575/sq mi)

Racial makeup (2011)
  - Black African: 75.3%
  - Coloured: 1.4%
  - Indian/Asian: 0.5%
  - White: 22.5%
  - Other: 0.3%

First languages (2011)
  - Northern Sotho: 26.2%
  - Afrikaans: 22.8%
  - Swazi: 18.7%
  - Zulu: 13.1%
  - Other: 19.2%
- Time zone: UTC+2 (SAST)
- Postal code (street): 1120
- PO box: 1120
- Area code: 013

Lydenburg, also known as Mashishing, is a town in Thaba Chweu Local Municipality, on the Mpumalanga highveld, South Africa. It is situated on the Sterkspruit/Dorps River tributary of the Lepelle River at the summit of the Long Tom Pass. It has a long, rich history, ranging from AD 500 to the present. The name is derived from the Dutch Lijdenburg, or "Town of Suffering", and is named for the experiences of the white settlers. In Northern Sotho, Mashishing means "long green grass." Lydenburg has become the centre of the South African fly-fishing industry and is an agricultural, tourism and mining hub.

== History ==
=== Ancient history ===
The area surrounding present day Lydenburg has a long history of human occupation. Rock paintings in surrounding areas point to early Khoe-San hunter-gather groups living on the land.

==== Lydenburg heads ====
Dating back to AD 500, the earliest known forms of African Iron Age sculpture below the equator, known as the Lydenburg heads were found in the area. The seven earthenware sculptures of heads and other pottery from the site are intricately decorated and may have been used for ceremonial or initiation purposes. However, this is speculative as there is little we know today about the people who made these sculptures. Their existence nevertheless points to Lydenburg's remarkable heritage.

=== Pre-colonial history ===
From around the 16th century a group referred to as the Bakoni people occupied the area. There is evidence of Bapedi people, who referred to the area as Mashishing, that lived in the surrounding area from as early as the 1700s.

=== Colonial History ===
==== Founding of Lydenburg ====
Lydenburg was founded in 1849 by a group of Voortrekkers under the leadership of Andries Potgieter when they abandoned their previous settlement Ohrigstad (to the north) due to a malaria epidemic. The town became the capital of the Lydenburg Republic ('De Republiek Lydenburg in Zuid Afrika') in 1856 and later in 1857 joined the Republic of Utrecht but in 1860 both these republics joined the Zuid Afrikaanse Republiek (ZAR). The town became the capital of the Lydenburg District of the South African Republic (ZAR).

Lydenburg became important because it was on the wagon route to the port of Delagoa Bay (now Maputo Bay) which was not under British control. In 1871 construction of the road was started by Abraham Espag under the orders of President Thomas François Burgers. The first wagons arrived in Lydenburg from Delagoa Bay in 1874.

==== Gold rush ====
On 6 February 1873, alluvial gold was discovered and within 3 months the Lydenburg goldfields were proclaimed. The First Boer War broke out between Britain and the Transvaal Republic in 1880. A British garrison under Lieutenant Walter Hillyar Colquhoun Long (uncle of the 1st Viscount Long) occupied Lydenburg to control the goldfields. It was from here that the ill-fated 94th Regiment under the command of Lieutenant-Colonel Philip Robert Anstruther marched to Pretoria. The remainder of the garrison at Lydenburg was besieged from 6 January 1881, following Long's refusal to surrender the garrison on 23 December 1880.

Land such as Boomplaats and Aapiesdoorndraai farms, near the town, was purchased by black South Africans in the early 1900s before the 1913 Land Act severely restricted black land ownership in South Africa. The communities here developed and irrigated the initially arid area into valuable and productive farms.

By 1910 the railway reached Lydenburg. In 1927 Lydenburg became a municipality.

=== Apartheid-era history ===
Forced removals from farms surrounding Lydenburg began in the early 1940s and continued through the 1960s. Residents on the farms, especially through the ICU, ANC and local chiefs, resisted the removals in different ways depending on local circumstances and allegiances. Often violently, the apartheid state removed the families to farms further from the town or to Sekhukhuneland. In 2001, in one of South Africa's first completed land restitution claims, Boomplaats farm was bought from Willem Pretorius and returned by the state to the Dinkwanyane community.

=== Name change ===
In June 2006, it was announced that Arts and Culture minister, Pallo Jordan, had approved the renaming Lydenburg to Mashishing, meaning "long green grass".

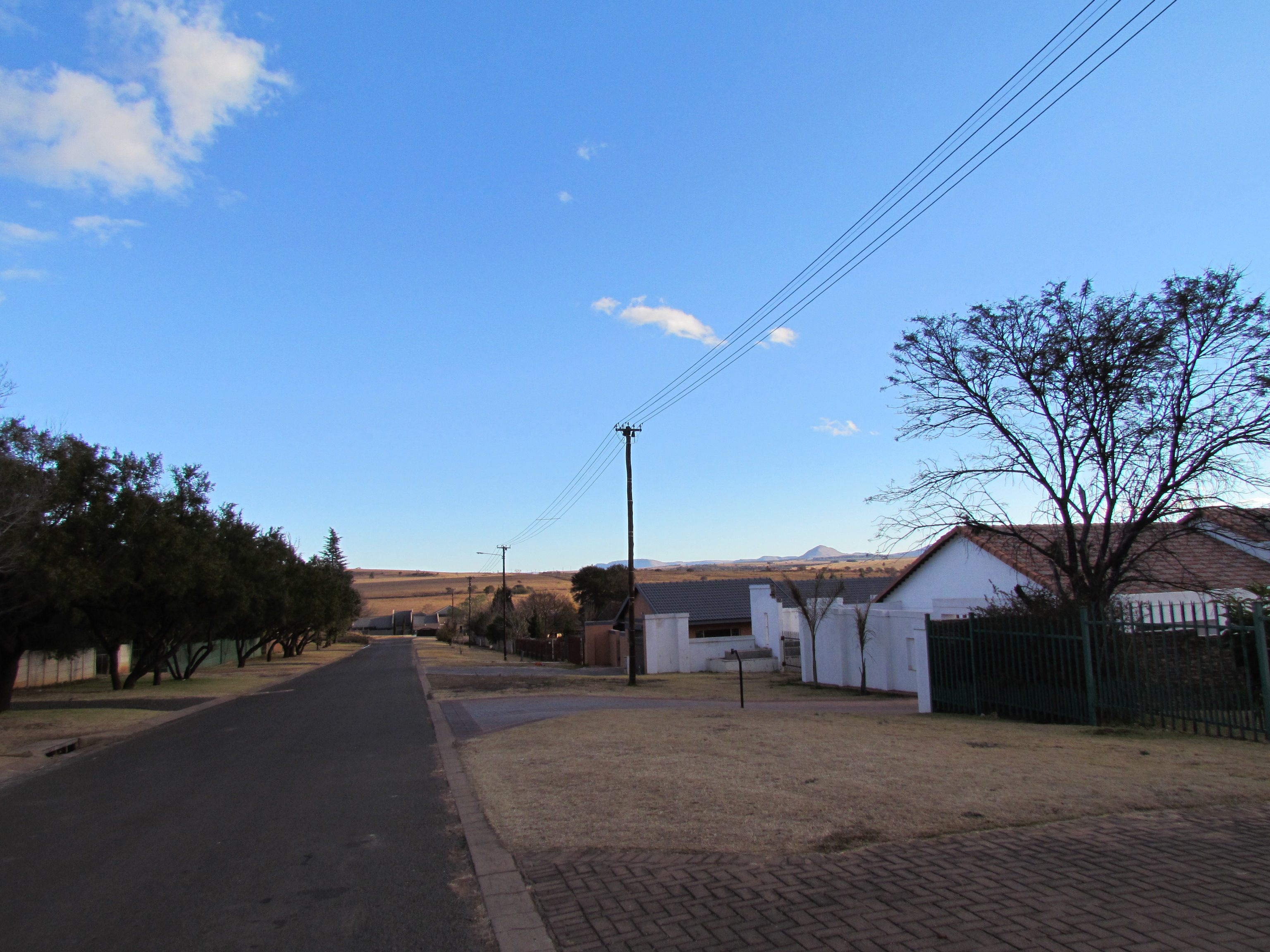
A side street in Lydenburg

== Education ==
- Marambane Primary School
- Lydenburg Primary School
- Höerskool Lydenburg Highschool
- Mashishing Secondary School
- Mashishing Campus Ehlanzeni TVET College
- Lesodi Primary School
- Skhila Secondary School

== Tourist attractions ==
- Lydenburg Museum
- Long Tom Pass
- Sterkspruit Nature Reserve

== See also ==
- Bapedi
- Lydenburg heads
- Mpumalanga
- Sekhukhuneland
- Jock of the Bushveld
