= Eerstegoud =

- Location within Limpopo Location within South Africa
- Coordinates: 23.985°S 29.351°E
- Country: South Africa
- Province: Limpopo
- District: Capricorn
- Municipality: Polokwane
- Time zone: UTC+2 (SAST)
- PO box: 0701

Eerstegoud is a village 14 km south-west of Polokwane. Laid out in 1868, it was first called Marabastad. At the request of the inhabitants the name was changed about 1954 to Eerstegoud, Afrikaans for 'first gold', in memory of the discovery in 1871 of the first gold in the Transvaal at Eersteling by Edward Button.
