= Christiaan Johannes Joubert =

Vice State President of the South African Republic

Personal details
- Born: 1834
- Died: 1911 (aged 76–77)

Military service
- Allegiance: South African Republic

Christiaan Johannes Joubert (1834–1911) was a former member of the executive council and Vice State President of the South African Republic.

He was elected as Vice State President of the South African Republic in 1885 after the death of Cornelis Johannes Bodenstein. He was vice president and acting minister of mines at the time of Witwatersrand Gold Rush which led to establishment of Johannesburg in 1887. Nicolaas Smit was elected vice president in June 1887 to succeed him.

At some time he was member of Volksraad.

Joubert Park, a suburb of Johannesburg, is named after him, as is the recreational Joubert Park in the city's central business district.
