= Robert Elwes (painter) =

English painter (1819–1878)

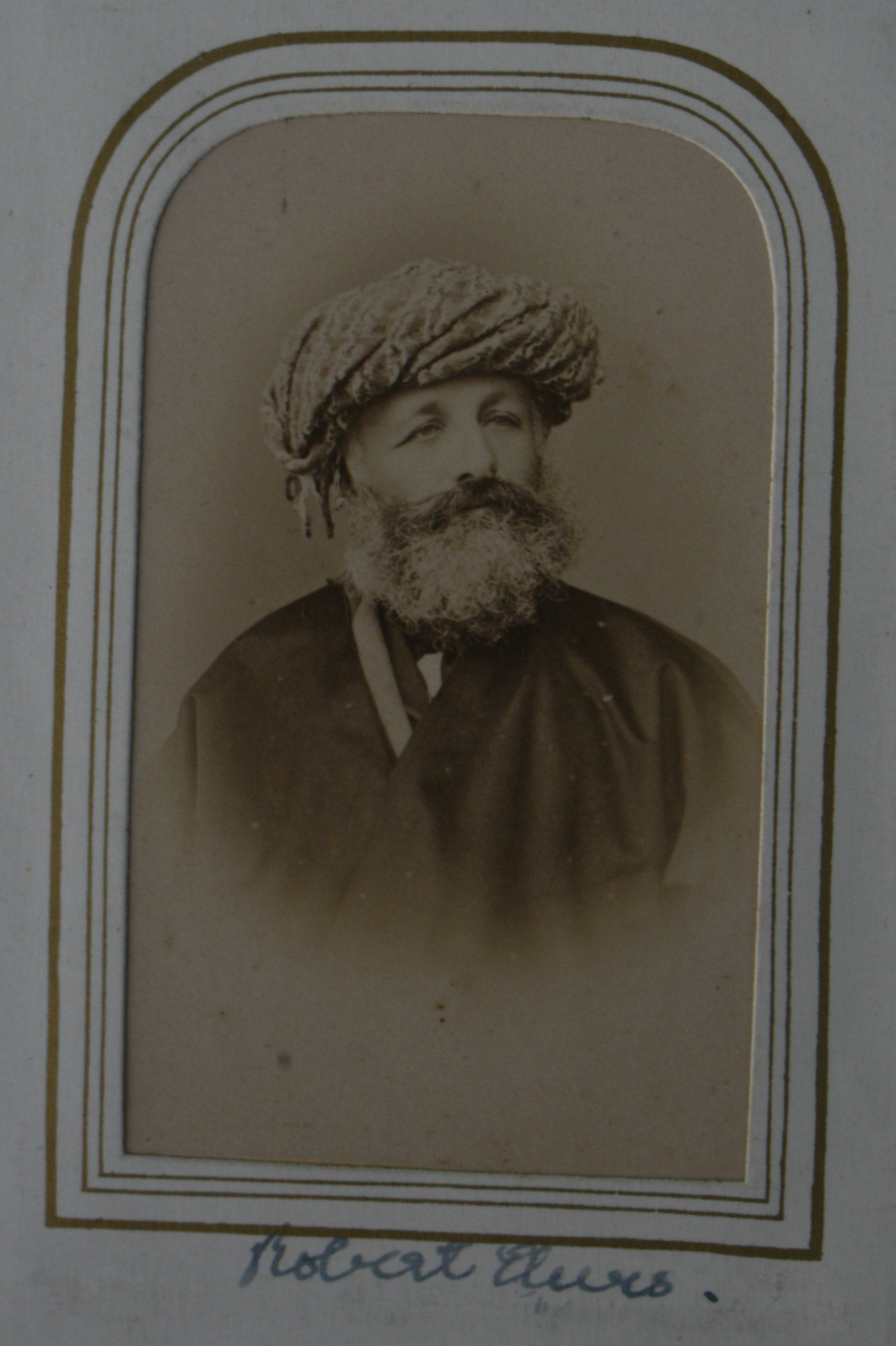
Carte de visite of Robert Elwes of Congham

Robert Elwes (1819–1878) was an English Victorian traveller and painter, and the author of A Sketcher's Tour Round the World illustrated by engravings from his own works which he published from his home at Congham, Norfolk, in 1853.

== Family background ==
Elwes was the second son of Henry Elwes of Colesbourne in Gloucestershire. His mother, Susan Hamond of Westacre, Norfolk, brought as her dowry the estate of Congham, eight miles from King's Lynn. It was here that Elwes and his wife settled, building Congham House in the late 1850s. Today only one wing remains following the disastrous fire of November 1939. The fire has meant the loss of much valuable material relating to the Elwes family, but the surviving work of Elwes, in the form of paintings and journals, provides an insight into the life of this Victorian country gentleman, exceptional not only for the extent of his travels, but also for the meticulousness of his artistic and literary records.

== First world tour ==
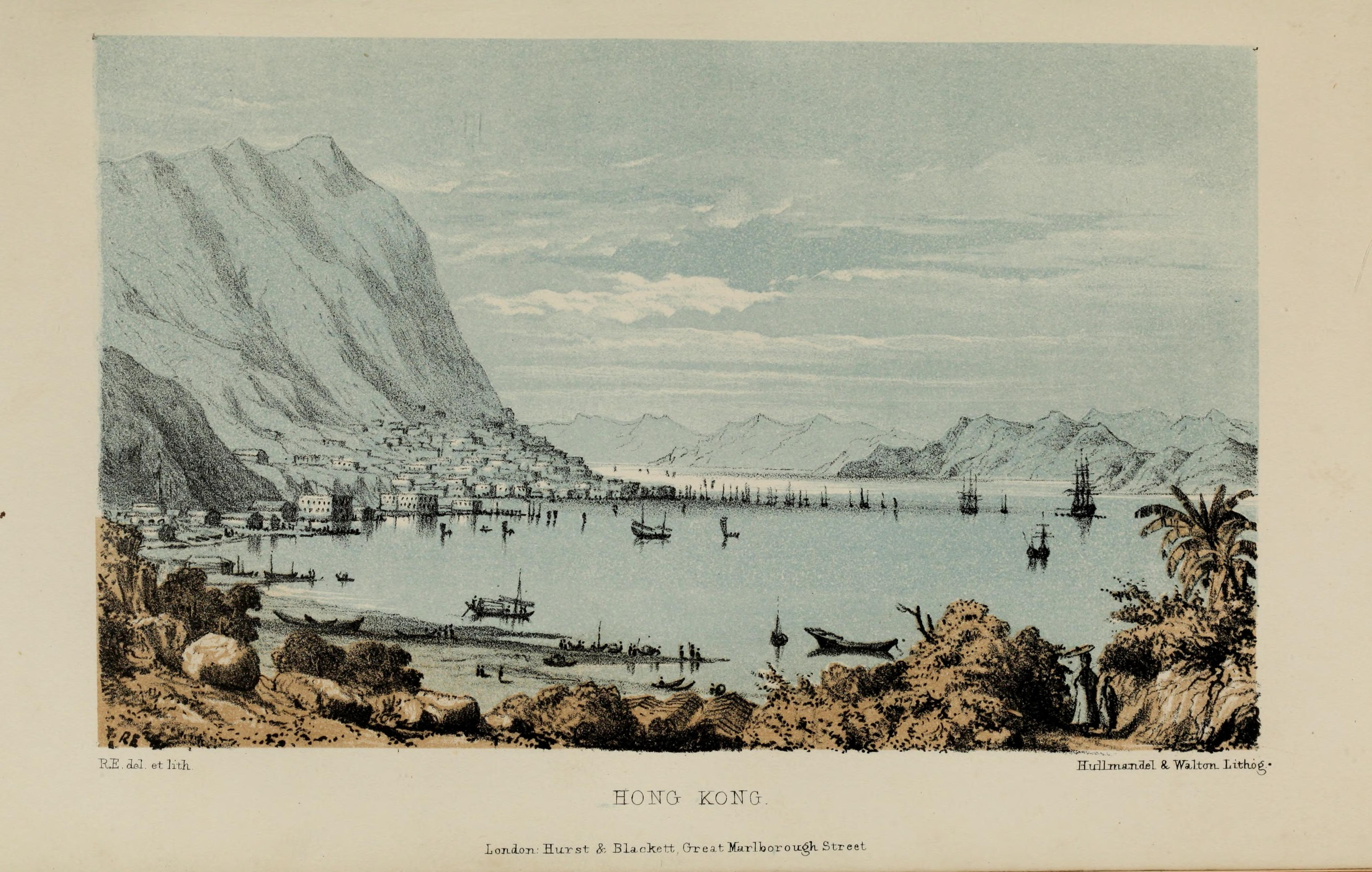
Robert Elwes, Hong Kong

Elwes travelled extensively in his twenties and thirties, but in 1848 he embarked on a journey that was to take him round the world. Robert Elwes, aged 28, left England on 20 March 1848 on board the Eclipse. This voyage around the world took two years and three months, sailing on 10 different ships. He painted and sketched many scenes on his journey. He arrived in Rio de Janeiro, Brazil, having crossed the Atlantic from Tenerife in 30 days. He explored a little of Brazil and then sailed to Buenos Aires, Argentina. He crossed the Pampas on horseback, a journey of 1,000 miles, crossing the Andes by mule and up the Pacific coast to Lima. He sailed across the Pacific to Honolulu and Tahiti and was shipwrecked off Tasmania in September 1849. Rescued by sealers and taken to Hobart with a cargo of 500 sheep, he then travelled overland across Tasmania to Launceston where he sailed (nervously) for Australia.

He continued his voyage, visiting and painting in Manila, Hong Kong, Canton and Shanghai and started towards home on 1 April 1850. His journey took him to Singapore, Penang, Bombay, Aden, the Red Sea and the Suez. From there, he travelled overland to Cairo (the Suez Canal was not built until 1859). His journey across the desert was in a horse-drawn "van" carrying six passengers. He sailed the most direct route home from Alexandria via Malta, Sicily, Naples and Genoa. From Genoa he travelled by "poste" to Milan and Chur and then by steamer down the Rhine to Rotterdam and thence to London where he arrived on 20 June 1850.

== Family life ==
Soon after his return he married Mary Lucas, daughter of the rector of Edith Weston in Rutland. Over the next eighteen years they had ten children, five sons and five daughters. His eldest son Robert Hamond Elwes was the young lieutenant who met a glorious death at the Battle of Laing's Nek, South Africa, in 1881. His last cry of "Floreat Etona!" as he led the charge was immortalized in the Royal Academy painting of that title by Lady Butler. Following the death of the eldest son, the second son Arthur Elwes (1858-1907) inherited the Congham estate. The third son Gervase (1860-1895) was a tea and coffee planter in the Far East. The fourth son Richard (Dick) (1866-1841) ran the Elwes family tea estates at Kituldeniya in Ceylon and the youngest son Hugh (1869-1882) died whilst at school at Hunstanton. Of the five daughters, all of whom were talented watercolour painters, Evelyn (1852-1940) never married, Susan (1853-1934) married Gustavus Talbot who became Member of Parliament for Hemel Hempstead, and Milly (1855-1915) married Sir William ffolkes of neighbouring Hillington. Ysabel (1859-1934) married Henry Birkbeck of Westacre and in the 1930s created a village industry, Westacre Doll's House furniture, which was sold in the Burlington Arcade in London. The youngest daughter, Violet, inherited her father's talent and enthusiasm for travel, painting and sketching as she travelled to visit her brother in Ceylon and thence to Malaya, Burma and Indonesia. Violet Elwes became the first white woman to visit Lombok, Indonesia, all recorded in her sketch books and her diaries.

== Second world tour ==
On the second major tour of which a published account survives, Elwes was accompanied by his wife in 1865 to the West Indies, visiting Panama, Jamaica, Dominica and Trinidad. His journal "W.S.W.: A Voyage in that Direction to the West Indies" was published the following year.

== Art career ==
Elwes belongs to an inveterate band of 19th-century travellers and explorers. He was to reach many of the places on the South American continent which, just sixteen years earlier, Charles Darwin had visited on his inland journeys from HMS Beagle. Sketching as he went, he would note the different varieties of flora and fauna to be found. It was an interest that was to produce a more renowned family representative in the person of Henry John Elwes of Colesbourne, FRS, who led many expeditions to Turkey, India, Asia Minor, Tibet and Nepal in addition to writing with Augustine Henry the multi-volumed Trees of Great Britain and Ireland.

The painter's journeys were conducted at an easy pace, dependent on the frequency of trading ships, coastal cruisers, the availability of pack horses and the hospitality of the local people. His contacts and acquaintanceships were extensive: letters of introduction ensured that he frequently lodged with distinguished company. However, his desire to see for himself the sights of which he had heard and read so much, contributed to some uncomfortable nights and dangerous encounters with bandits and unscrupulous guides.

In his books Elwes sought to record his experiences and observations for the future traveller. In the preface of his West Indies volume he explains his intention as informative, "for...unless a traveler [sic?] studies and reads up a country before he goes there he must often be liable to pass by objects worthy of notice without knowing it till afterwards... The lithographs have been done entirely by myself and I hope they will give some idea of the beauty of the scenery."

Briefly captured illustrations though these lithographs had great accuracy and detail. From his sketches also came the larger watercolours on rough dark paper, distinguished by his characteristic use of blue and sharp white highlights. His work reflected the familiar coastline and countryside around his home, contrasting with the exotic scenes he encountered abroad, from the craggy slopes of the Alps and the Andes, to the distinctive architecture of Moscow and Constantinople.

Elwes seldom signed his pictures; however, he used his cipher "RE" with the R inverted as his signature on sketches and china and "R E" is how he was affectionately referred to by his family.

== Bibliography ==
- Elwes, Robert: "A Sketcher's Tour Round the World", 1853
- 29th King's Lynn Festival: "A Sketcher's Tour", 1979
- Barclay, Sir Roderick: "Travelling at Leisure - A world tour in 1848-1850". Country Life, 22 September 1983
- Elwes, Robert: "WSW - A Voyage in that Direction". Kerby: London, 1866
- Wood, Christopher: "The Dictionary of British Art Vol. IV Victorian Painters 1 The Text", 1971
- Graves, Algernon: "Dictionary of Artists Principal London Exhibitions 1760 - 1893". Kingsmead, 1969
- Birkbeck, H: "The Birkbecks of Norfolk", 1993
