= Helena Lefroy =

Irish botanist (1820–1908)

- Born: Helena Trench; 27 January 1820; Ireland
- Died: 1908 (aged 87–88)
- Known for: Discovery of Euphorbia peplis (purple spurge)
- Scientific career
- Fields: Natural history, botany

Helena Lefroy (1820–1908) was an Irish botanist known for her discovery of the only Euphorbia peplis specimen in Ireland.

== Early life ==
Helena Lefroy was born Helena Trench on 27 January 1820 in Dublin. The Trench family name originated from Thomas Trench, Dean of Kildare. Thomas was born on 10 May 1761. He married Mary Weldon of Rahinderry in the Queens county. Her parents were Reverend F.S. and Lady Helena Trench. When Helena was fourteen the family moved to Kilmorony where she developed an interest in botany and gardening. Her interest in botany came from her mother. By living with her father she became fluent in many languages including French, German and Italian. Her father was the Rector of Athy and from this Helena's strong religious beliefs stemmed. Reverend Trench died on 23 November 1860 and is buried at St. John's graveyard in Athy. She also had a sister Maria Trench who became Maria Wilson after marriage. Maria, like Helena, died in 1908.

== Personal life ==
She married Jeffry Lefroy in 1844 who was a Dean of Dromore. He was the son of the Honorable Thomas Langlois Lefroy, Lord Chief Justice of Ireland. A book of memoirs is available where it shows Thomas writing to and about his son Jeffry as well as Lefroy and their two boys. Her two sons wrote a biography where they talk about their mother and her contributions.

Her husband Jeffry was a co-author of the journal article, The Great Famine: Some Correspondence relating to Social Conditions in the Loughbrickland Area 1840-1850. This book included a number of entries of famine relief correspondence and letters from the time of the famine. From these entries the authors write notes making relevance to what was happening at the time. Her two sons have written a book about Lefroy entitled Helena Lefroy: Some simple recollections of her life and influence. This can be found in the National Library of Ireland. There are memoirs available about her son George Alfred Lefroy who was the Bishop of Calcutta. In these memoirs it mentions how fond he was of his mother.

== Botany ==
Lefroy was known primarily for the discovery of the purple spurge. Purple spurge is a species of Euphorbia; it usually grows on gravelly and sandy beaches. It has traces to western Europe and northern Africa. The plant is a small, prostrate plant with four stems at the base growing between 10–20 cm (3.9–7.9 in) long. She found this in Tramore, Waterford in 1839. Other botanists attempted to visit the area where she discovered it but they failed, which led people to believe it was very rare and now extinct. Rob Randall mentions this plant in his annual report in 1978 where he visits Lundy. He is puzzled by the fact that this plant is found on certain beaches on the island and not others.

== Other Discoveries ==
In The Natural History Review, a quarterly journal of biological science there is a reference to a Miss Trench on page 538 upon which it claims that she discovered Acino vulgare: "Found near Athy by Miss Trench, in 1838; and in July, 1840, in a sandy field at Portmarnock,"

== Search for Euphorbia peplis ==
Through finding Euphorbia peplis, Lefroy inspired others to search for this plant species. Richard Barrington went searching for it in 1870 and 1871, but to no avail. This was followed by Trinity College, Dublin student Henry Chichester Hart in 1882, also without success. This resulted in the plant being classed as extinct.
