= Vice State President of the South African Republic =

Deputy head of state of the South African Republic

- Vise-staatspresident der Zuid-Afrikaansche Republiek
- Arms of the South African Republic

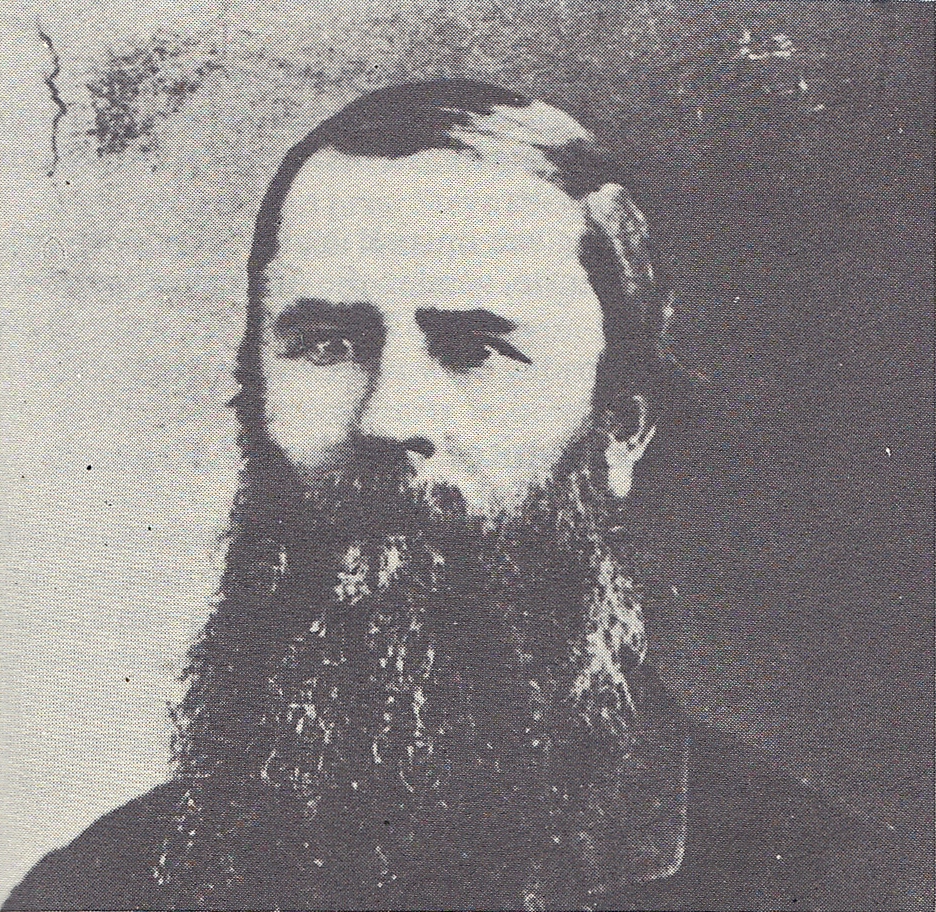
- Longest serving Nicolaas Smit; 20 June 1887 – 4 April 1896
- Style: His Excellency
- Formation: March 1877
- First holder: Paul Kruger
- Final holder: Schalk Willem Burger
- Abolished: 31 May 1902

The Vice State President of the South African Republic (Dutch: Vise-staatspresident der Zuid-Afrikaansche Republiek) was the second highest political position in the South African Republic.

The vice president was chosen by the Volksraad among the members of the Executive Council (Uitvoerende Raad). The vice president was to act if the State President of the South African Republic was indisposed in case of mental or bodily disability, or was outside of the country. The vice president was constitutional successor of the president.

The position was first established in March 1877 before the British annexation in April 1877.

== List of officeholders ==
No.	Portrait	Name (Birth–Death)	Term of office		
No.	Portrait	Name (Birth–Death)	Took office	Left office	Time in office
1		Paul Kruger (1825–1904)	March 1877	12 April 1877	1 month
First Boer War (12 April 1877 – 8 August 1881); First British annexation (Transvaal Colony) (Note: The government of the South African Republic resumed to exercise its functions in accordance with the resolution of the Volksraad of 13 December 1880; Transvaal Territory was granted self-government in accordance with the Pretoria Convention, subject to the suzerainty of the British crown, on 8 August 1881.)
(1)		Paul Kruger (1825–1904) (Note: Kruger was a member of the triumvirate, and also held this additional title.)	13 December 1880	9 May 1883	2 years, 147 days
2		Piet Joubert (1834–1900)	May 1883	October 1884	1 year, 5 months
3		Cornelis Johannes Bodenstein (1826–1885)	November 1884	26 June 1885 ^{†}	7 months
4		Christiaan Johannes Joubert (1834–1911)	1885	1887	2 years
5		Nicolaas Smit (1837–1896)	20 June 1887	4 April 1896 ^{†}	8 years, 289 days
Second Boer War (11 October 1899 – 31 May 1902)
(2)		Piet Joubert (1834–1900)	May 1896	28 March 1900 ^{†}	3 years, 10 months
6		Schalk Willem Burger (1852–1918)	May 1900	31 May 1902	2 years
Post abolished with the Treaty of Vereeniging; Second British annexation (Transvaal Colony)
