= Robert Elwes =

British Army officer (1856–1881)

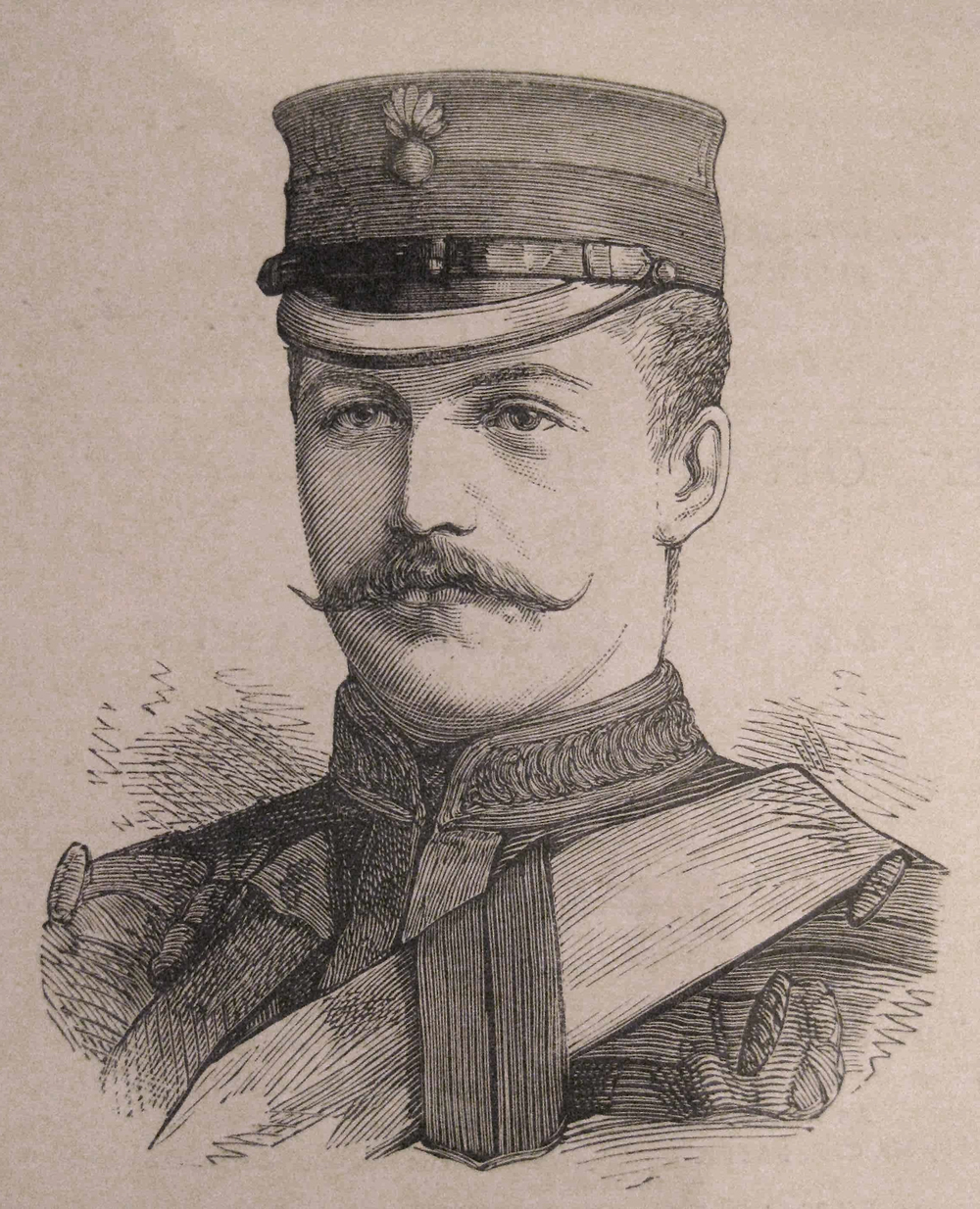
Portrait of Lieut. R. H. Elwes Wood engraving published in The Illustrated London News, 30 April 1881

Lieutenant Robert Hamond Elwes (1856 – 28 January 1881) was a British Army officer who was killed in action during the First Boer War. As a junior officer in the Grenadier Guards regiment, Elwes fought in the Battle of Laing's Nek where he died while leading a cavalry charge against Boer forces. His death was portrayed in Elizabeth Thompson's 1898 painting "Floreat Etona!".

== Family and early life ==
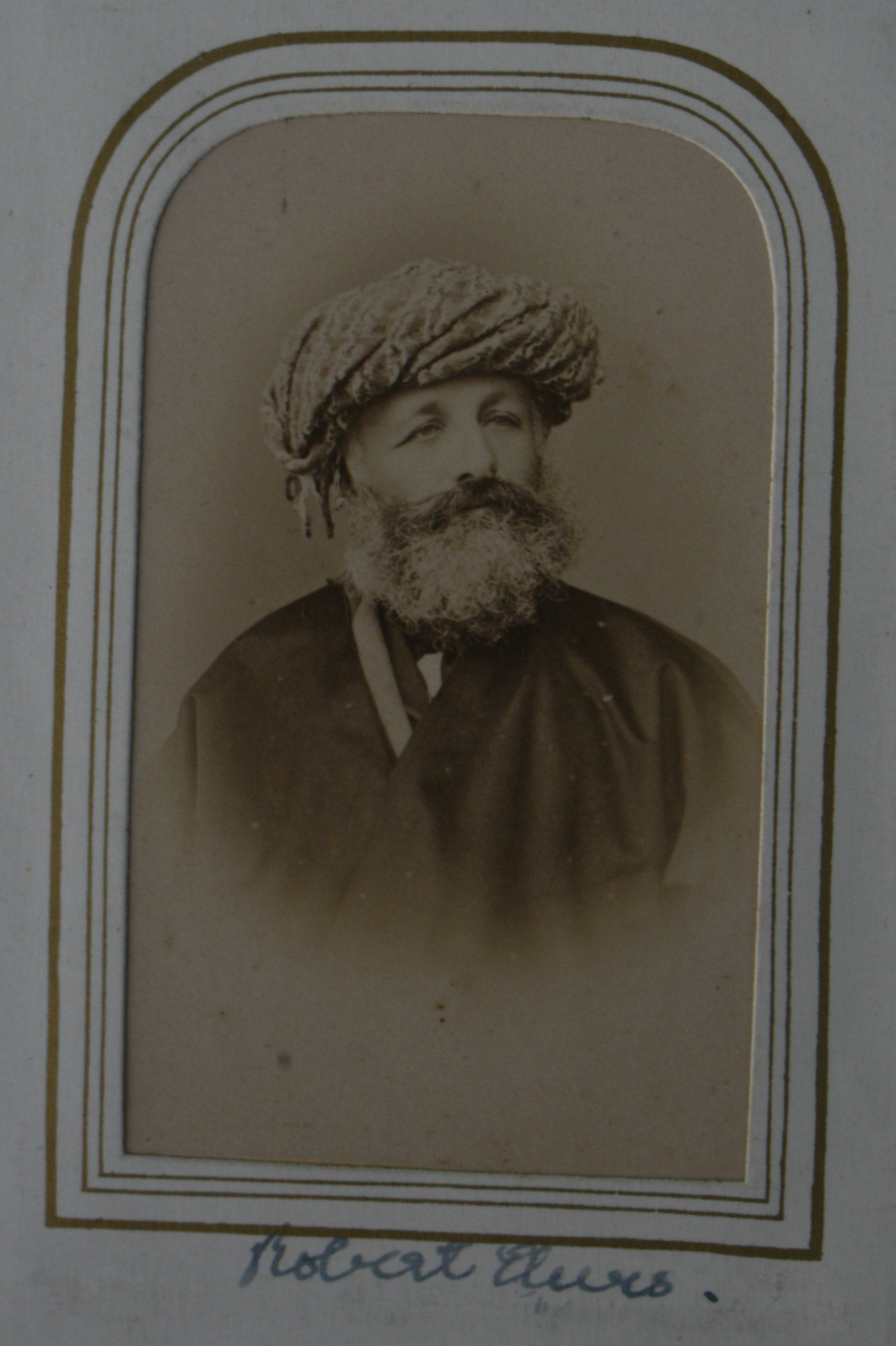
His father: Robert Elwes, of Congham, senior, (1819–1878)

Elwes was born in 1856 to Robert Elwes and Mary Frances Lucas at Congham House, near King's Lynn in Norfolk. He was educated at Eton College. After graduating, he joined the Grenadier Guards where he gained the rank of Lieutenant in November 1879.

== The First Boer War ==
Following the Boer declaration of independence for the Transvaal in 1880 the British suffered a series of disastrous defeats in attempting to regain the territory. At the outbreak of the war Elwes was sent to South Africa where he was seconded from the 3rd Battalion, Grenadier Guards to the 58th Regiment and appointed Aide-de-Camp to Major-General Sir George Pomeroy Colley, the British High Commissioner for South East Africa and Commander-in-Chief of Natal. On 9 January 1881 Elwes dined at Government House at Pietermaritzburg with Colley, his wife, Lady Colley, and other officers and members of the general's staff. Guests included the author H. Rider Haggard. The next day Elwes left Pietermaritzburg with the British Natal Field Force led by Colley, who took them into the Transvaal via Newcastle and Laing's Nek to Pretoria to relieve the garrisons in the besieged towns who were desperately short of food and ammunition.

=== Battle of Laing's Nek ===
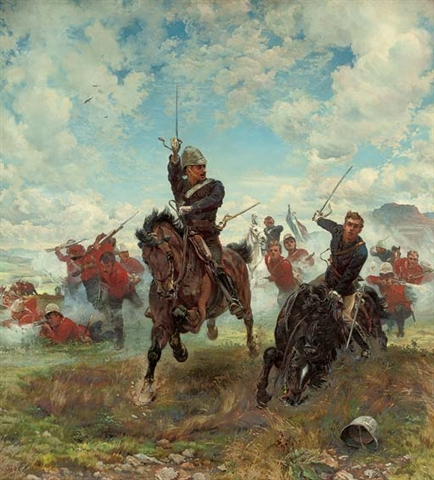
Elizabeth Thompson's "Floreat Etona!".

On the morning of 28 January, Colley tried to force a way through the pass. However, the Boers, under the command of Commandant-General Joubert, had about 2,000 men in the area, with at least 400 fortifying the heights around Laing's Nek. Many commanders drove their men so hard up the steep slope in their rush to get to the enemy that when the decisive charge was actually made, the exhausted infantrymen and cavalry came nowhere near the Boer defences. At around 11:00 a.m., Colonel Deane along with Elwes and other members of General's staff were ordered to lead the 58th up the hill, riding to their certain death against the Boer bullets. A witness of the attack on described the incident:

Poor Elwes fell among the 58th. He shouted to another Eton boy (an Adjutant of the 58th whose horse had been shot), 'Come along Monck! Floreat Etona! We must be in the front rank!' And he was shot immediately".

The event was immortalized in Elizabeth Thompson's painting, "Floreat Etona!" (1898). Among those killed beside Elwes during the charge were Major Poole, and Lieutenants Dolphin and Inman of the General's staff. Elwes was buried at Mount Prospect Cemetery, Natal.
