= Battle of Schuinshoogte =

1881 battle during the First Boer War

Coordinates: 27°36′59.30″S 29°52′40.9″E

- Part of First Boer War
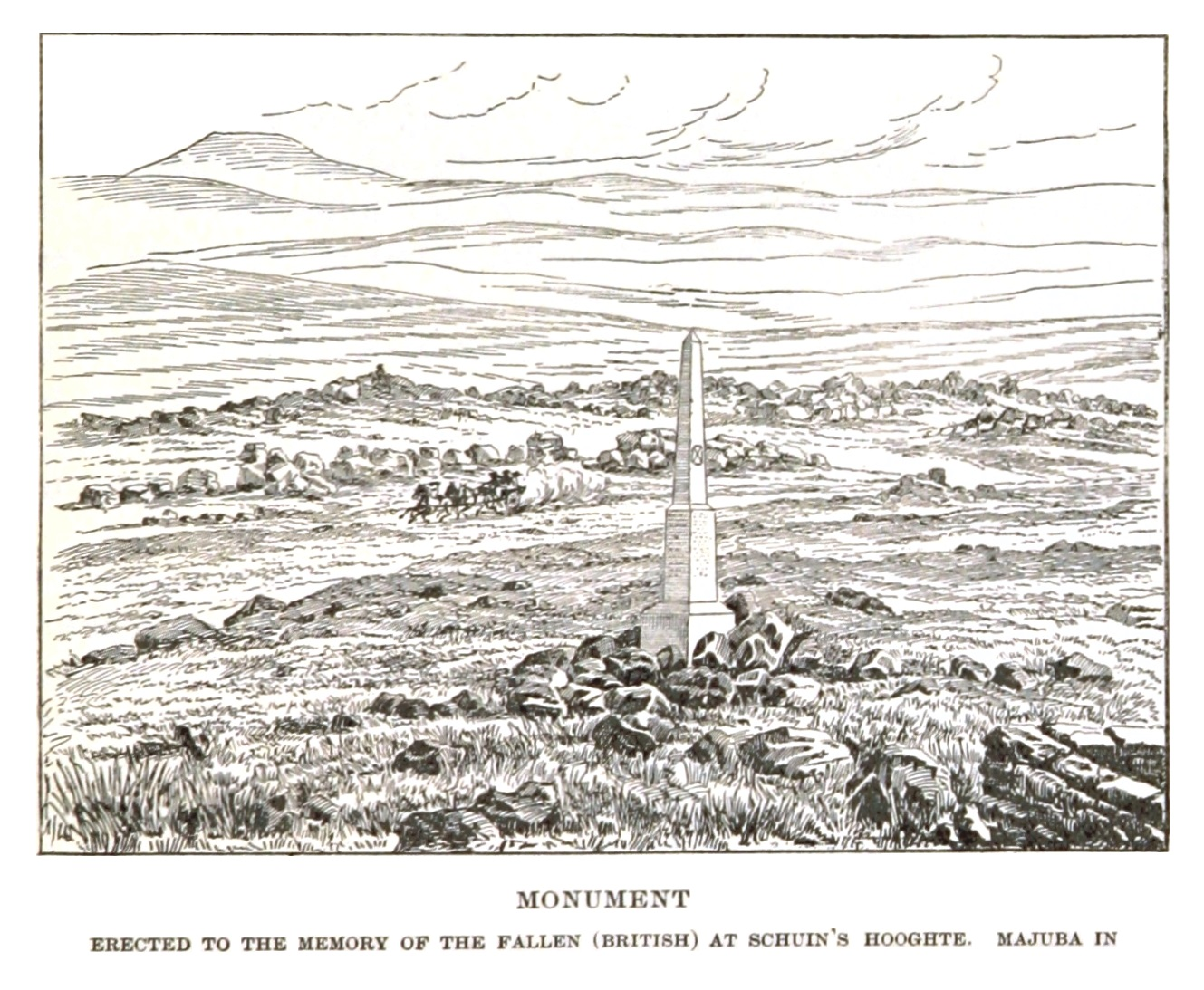
- Monument erected to the memory of the fallen (British) at Schuin's Hooghte, Majuba
Date	8 February 1881
Location	Ingogo, Natal
Result	Boer victory

Belligerents
South African Republic	United Kingdom

Commanders and leaders
(South African Republic) Piet Joubert (South African Republic) Nicolaas Smit (South African Republic) J. D. Weilbach	(United Kingdom of Great Britain and Ireland) Maj Gen. Sir George Pomeroy Colley

Strength
300–500 infantry	240 infantry 38 cavalry 2 cannon

Casualties and losses
8 killed 10 wounded	66 killed 77 wounded

Battle of Schuinshoogte, also known as Battle of Ingogo, was fought north of Newcastle, KwaZulu-Natal, on 8 February 1881 during the First Boer War. General Sir George Pomeroy Colley's communications with Newcastle were under constant harassment by mounted Boer patrols under Commander J. D. Weilbach after the Boer victory at the Battle of Laing's Nek and as a result he planned to clear a path along the Newcastle–Mount Prospect road to better protect the British supply line, and receive fresh reinforcements he needed to bolster his ranks.

== Battle ==
At roughly 9:00 am he left the Mount Prospect camp with a force consisting mostly of infantrymen. A company of the 60th Rifles (King's Royal Rifle Corps) and two artillery pieces were left at a ridge overlooking the Ingogo River, while a handful of mounted men and infantry covered the drift.

As Colley advanced up the slope of the Ingogo he received word from his scouting party that a mainly mounted Boer force under Gen. Nicolaas Smit and Comdt. Weilbach was approaching nearby. The British formed circular/squared defensive positions on the crest of the ridge with 240 infantry, 38 cavalry and two pieces of artillery while the roughly 300 Boers attempted to surround them and cut them off from escape.

From noon until about 5:00 that evening a series of close range engagements was fought and Colley's troops suffered heavily from the accurate and concentrated Boer fire. Although the 60th Rifles wore dark green (in fact, almost black) uniforms, these were still in contrast to the light-coloured South African veldt, the only concession to camouflage being the white foreign service helmet stained khaki with tea. The gunners and mounted troops also wore dark uniforms, but the gunners in particular were exposed when working their guns. In contrast the Boers wore khaki coloured clothing, and were also expert at fieldcraft, thus being able to blend into the environment.

Afterward heavy rain began to fall and the battle came to an abrupt end. Rainfall swelled the Ingogo river, making it very difficult to ford. Boer forces, imagining that the British would be unable to cross, especially with artillery, waited during the night to resume the battle the next day. Colley's men, meanwhile, made a desperate night march, and managed to escape, horses, guns and all, although several men drowned in the river crossing. The Boer failure to assault and capture the guns during the rainstorm, allowing the British column to escape, probably represents their only major error during the war.

== Aftermath ==
It has been speculated had Colley received his reinforcements before the onslaught of the rain, he would probably have been able to defeat the Boers for the first time and give the British better bargaining power during the peace negotiations.

When the British returned with a burial party the next day, they found the Boers had returned to take care of their own dead and wounded. No engagement occurred. The eight Boer dead were buried on the farm "Geelhoutboom" some 5 km west of the battle site. The British lost seven officers, with a total of 66 men killed and 77 wounded. The men were buried on the battlefield while the officers' bodies were exhumed four days later and taken to Fort Amiel for reburial.

Colley was plagued by defeat throughout the war, and although he would receive his reinforcements, his men were seriously demoralised by the string of defeats. Eventually he would be killed in action at the Battle of Majuba Hill.
