= Lefroy =

Lefroy may refer to:

== People ==
- Anne Brydges Lefroy (1747/8–1804), English writer and poet
- Harold Maxwell-Lefroy (1877–1925), Canadian entomologist
- Helena Lefroy (1820–1908), Irish botanist
- Henry Maxwell Lefroy (1818–1879), explorer of Western Australia
- Jeremy Lefroy (born 1959), British Conservative Party politician and Member of Parliament
- John Henry Lefroy (1817–1890), British military officer, colonial administrator, and scientist
- Thomas Langlois Lefroy (1776–1869), Irish politician and judge, neighbour and love interest of Jane Austen
  - Anthony Lefroy (MP) (1800–1890), son of Thomas Langlois Lefroy and Irish Member of Parliament
  - Anthony O'Grady Lefroy (1816–1897), nephew of Thomas Langlois Lefroy and Colonial Treasurer of Western Australia
    - Henry Lefroy (1854–1930), 11th Premier of Western Australia and son of Anthony O'Grady Lefroy

== Places ==
- Lake Lefroy, a salt lake in Western Australia named for Henry Maxwell Lefroy
- Lefroy Airport, in Ontario, Canada
- Mount Lefroy, mountain in Canada named for John Henry Lefroy
- Lefroy, Tasmania, a locality in Australia
