= Joachim Ferreira =

Boer commandant

Joachim Johannes Ferreira
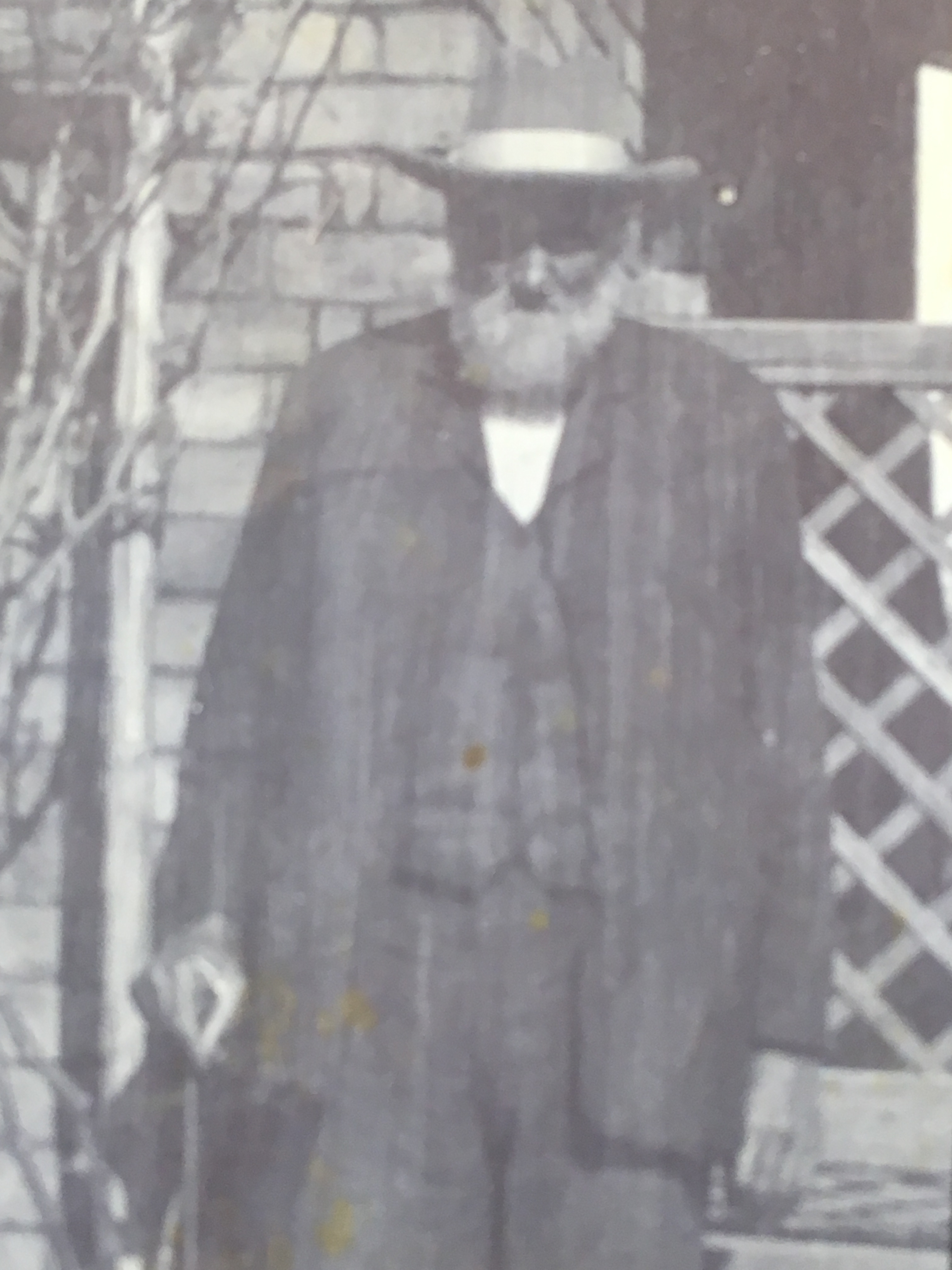
- Born: August 8, 1835; Utrecht, Klip River Republic, KwaZulu-Natal, South Africa
- Died: May 17, 1917 (aged 81); Piet Retief, Transvaal Province, Union of South Africa
- Burial place: Piet Retief, Eastvaal District Council, Mpumalanga, South Africa
- Spouse: Adriana Gertina Davel
- Military career
- Rank: General
- Commands: Utrecht Commando
- Conflicts: First Boer War: Battle of Majuba Hill, 27 February 1881

Joachim Johannes Ferreira (8 August 1835 – 16 May 1917) was a Boer commandant of the First Boer War. This general J. Ferreira should not be confused with general I. Ferreira.

== Family ==
Ferreira was born near Uitenhage, Eastern Cape Province, South Africa, as the eldest child of Marthinus Stephanus Ferreira (born 2 February 1810) and Aletta Prinsloo (born 1815), with a younger brother and sister. Young Ferreira was taken on the Great Trek as an infant. He married Adriana Gertina Davel (31 January 1848 – Piet Retief, Eastvaal District Council, Mpumalanga, 29 January 1929) and had a daughter by her.

== Career ==
He settled near Swaziland with other Voortrekker families in what they called the Commonwealth of the Klein Vrystaat in 1875. At the same time, Swazi King Mbandzeni granted a 36,000-acre grazing concession to Ferreira and his son-in-law, Franz Ignatius Maritz, the largest concession to Boer settlers at the time.

Ferreira began during the First Boer War (1880-1881) as the commandant of the Utrecht commando, and went on to lead one of the two Boer divisions at the Battle of Majuba Hill on 27 February 1881. The other group was led by Stephanus Roos. Ferreira was responsible for negotiating the transfer of land east of the Lebombo Mountains to the South African Republic. His plans were frustrated by the actions of Sir Charles Saunders who annexed the territory which became known as British Maputaland.

In the Second Boer War (1899-1902) Ferreira was a Boer general as well.

Joachim Ferreira died near Piet Retief on 16 May 1917.

== Bibliography ==
- Breytenbach, J. H. (1973). Die stryd in Natal, Jan. - Feb. 1900. Die Geskiedenis van die Tweede Vryheidsoorlog in Suid-Afrika, 1899-1902 (in Afrikaans). Vol. III. Pretoria: Die Staatsdrukker. Pages 3, 69, 260, 378, 380-386, 393, 480-481, and 533.
- Jones, H. M. (1993). A Biographical Register of Swaziland to 1902. University of Natal Press. ISBN 9780869808801.
- Laband, J. (2014). The Transvaal Rebellion: The First Boer War, 1880–1881. Routledge. ISBN 9781317868460.
- Pakenham, Thomas (1991). The Scramble for Africa. Random House. ISBN 0-349-10449-2.
- Uys, I. S. (1992). South African Military Who's Who, 1452–1992. Fortress Publishers. ISBN 9780958317337.
