= Ingogo =

- Location within KwaZulu-Natal Location within South Africa
- Coordinates: 27.578°S 29.912°E
- Country: South Africa
- Province: KwaZulu-Natal
- District: Amajuba
- Municipality: Newcastle
- Time zone: UTC+2 (SAST)
- PO box: 2944

Ingogo is a locality some 25 km north of Newcastle, site of a battle on 8 February 1881, during the First Anglo-Boer War, in which British casualties numbered 76 while Boer losses amounted to 8. The name is derived from that of the Ngogo River. The form iNgogo has been approved.
