= George Colley (British Army officer) =

British Army general (1835–1881)

Major-General Sir George Colley KCSI CB CMG
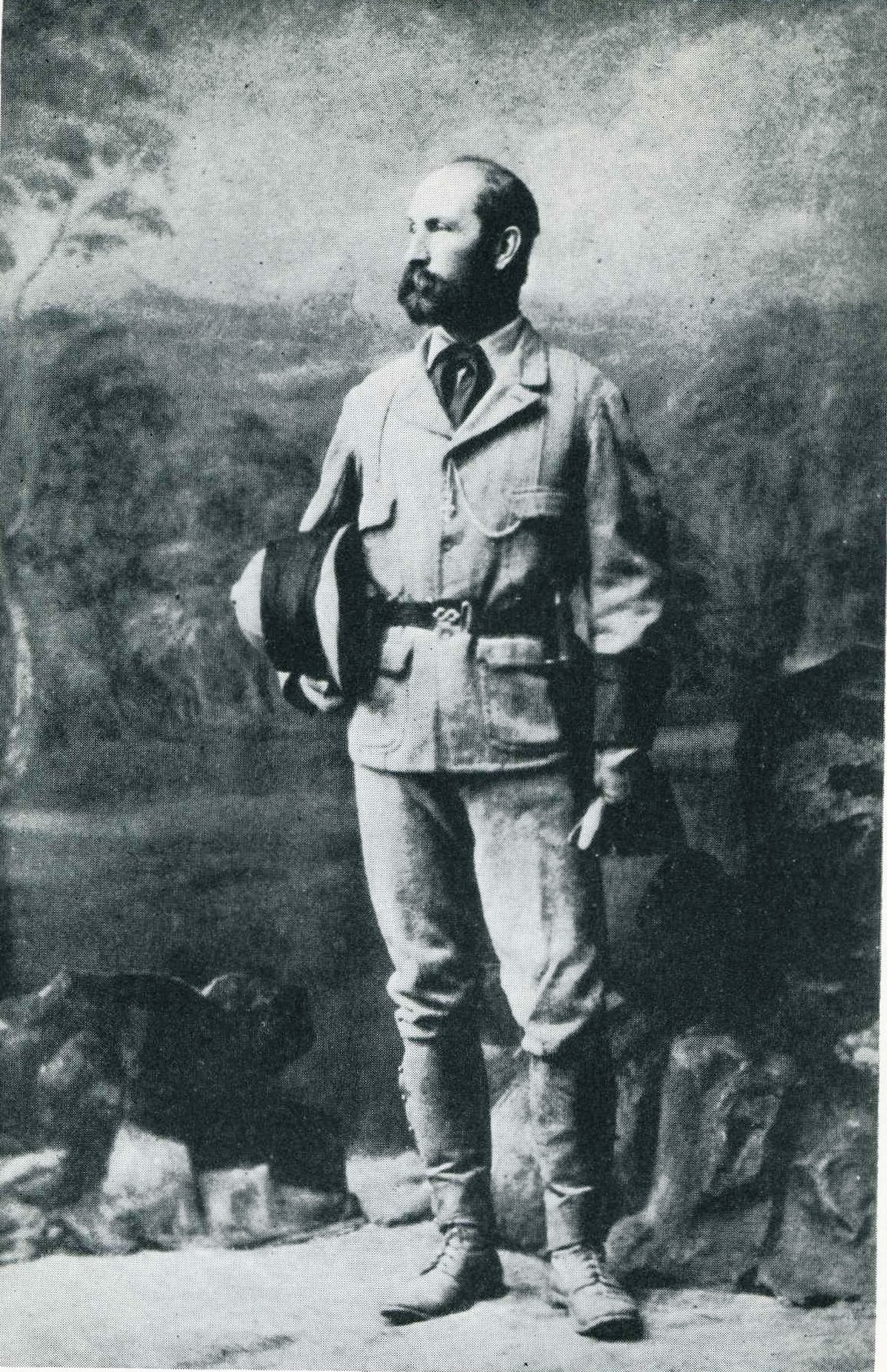
- Colonel George Colley in 1874
- Born: 1 November 1835; Rathangan, County Kildare, Ireland, U.K.
- Died: 27 February 1881 (aged 45); Majuba Hill, KwaZulu-Natal, South Africa
- Burial place: Mount Prospect Cemetery, Natal
- Military career
- Allegiance: United Kingdom
- Branch: British Army
- Service years: 1852–1881
- Rank: Major-General
- Commands: Governor and Commander-in-Chief of Natal
- Conflicts: Second Opium War; Second Anglo-Afghan War; First Boer War: Battle of Laing's Nek; Battle of Schuinshoogte; Battle of Majuba Hill †
- Awards: Knight Commander of the Order of the Star of India; Companion of the Order of the Bath; Companion of the Order of St Michael and St George

Major-General Sir George Pomeroy Colley, KCSI, CB, CMG (1 November 1835 – 27 February 1881) was a British Army officer who became Governor and Commander-in-Chief of Natal and High Commissioner for South Eastern Africa. Colley was killed in action, at the Battle of Majuba Hill.

== Early years ==
He was the third and youngest son of the Hon. George Francis Pomeroy (George Francis Colley from 1830) of Ferney, County Dublin, by his wife, Frances, third daughter of Thomas Trench, dean of Kildare, and was a grandson of John Pomeroy, 4th Viscount Harberton. Raised in Rathangan, County Kildare, he was educated at Cheam, Surrey, where his headmaster, Dr Mayo, described him as "swift to take offence, prompt and vigorous in resenting it".

He was educated at the Royal Military College, Sandhurst, where he was first in general merit and good conduct at the examinations in May 1852, and was appointed at the age of sixteen to an ensigncy without purchase in the 2nd or Queen's foot. His biographer Sir William F. Butler writes: 'George Colley at this time has been described to me by one who remembers him well in his seventeenth year. He was slight and well-proportioned, but with a look of great physical strength. The features possessed the strongly moulded type noticeable in several branches of the Colley race; the brown hair fell upon a forehead already suggesting intellectual power. His chief interests at this time were the artistic and literary pursuits which always held their own, notwithstanding an arduous professional life, until in the stress of the last few years they were necessarily laid aside. On such topics he was, I am told, often full of talk — at other times silent and dreamy. Though finished in manner even as a lad, he himself seems in his boyish years to have suffered from a quite disproportionate sense of shyness.'

After two years' service with the depot, he was promoted to a lieutenancy without purchase, and joined the headquarters of his regiment, then on the eastern frontier of Cape Colony.

In 1857–58, he held a border magistracy at the Cape, and showed great energy. On one occasion he received notice from the governor, Sir George Grey, of an insurrection which he had already suppressed. He was also employed to execute a survey of the Trans-kei country, a dangerous service in the then disturbed state of Kaffirland. When the Queen's were ordered to China, Colley rejoined his regiment, in which he obtained his company on 12 June 1860, and was present with it at the capture of the Taku forts, the actions of 12–14 August and 18–21 September 1860, and the advance on Peking.

== Staff College ==
His regiment went home, and he returned for a brief period to the Cape to complete his work there, and then entered the Staff College, Sandhurst. He came out at the head of the list the same year, having passed with great distinction in ten months instead of the ordinary two years.

Colley was an accomplished artist in watercolours, and spent much of his leave in sketching tours on Dartmoor, in Normandy, Spain, and other places. His literary attainments were considerable. He was in the habit of rising early, and securing always two hours before breakfast time for some special study. He thus acquired the Russian language, and studied chemistry, political economy, and other subjects not directly connected with his profession.

In recognition of his services, he was promoted to a brevet-majority on 6 March 1863. After serving for some years as major of brigade at Plymouth, the headquarters of the western district, he was appointed professor of military administration and law at the Staff College. While there he wrote the article 'Army,' extending over sixty pages, for the ninth edition of the Encyclopædia Britannica. He was engaged in this work from June to November 1873. The last portion of the manuscript was sent in a few days before the author, now a lieutenant-colonel, set off for the Gold Coast to join the Ashanti expedition under Sir Garnet Wolseley. Arriving at a time when the failure of the transport was causing serious apprehension, Colley infused new life into that service; and the administrative skill and energy which he displayed contributed largely to the success of the expedition. He became part of the 'Africa Ring'.

Early in 1875 Colley, who had been made a colonel for his services in Ashanti, accompanied Sir Garnet Wolseley on a special mission to Natal, where he temporarily undertook the duties of colonial treasurer, in which capacity he was instrumental in introducing many reforms into the administration of the colony. But the chief feature of this visit to South Africa was a journey that he made into the Transvaal, and thence through Swaziland to the Portuguese settlement at Delagoa Bay, which bore fruit in a valuable report, and a map, which is entered in the 'British Museum Map Catalogue,' 67075.

When Lord Lytton was appointed viceroy of India, early in 1876, he took Colley as his military secretary. This appointment was subsequently exchanged for the higher one of private secretary to the viceroy. It is no secret that in this capacity Colley exercised great influence in the events which led to the occupation of Kabul and the Treaty of Gandamak.

He was still holding the office of private secretary to the viceroy when Sir Garnet Wolseley, on being ordered from Cyprus to Natal, after the disasters in Zululand, asked that Colley might join him, to which Lord Lytton consented. Colley accordingly served as chief of the staff to Wolseley in Zululand and the Transvaal, until the murder of Sir Louis Cavagnari at Kabul, and the outbreak of the second Afghan war caused his recall to India, when he resumed his post of private secretary to the viceroy.

Colley, who had received the distinctions of Companion of the Order of the Bath and Companion of the Order of St Michael and St George, was created Knight Commander of the Order of the Star of India in recognition of his official services in India.

== Second Anglo-Afghan War ==
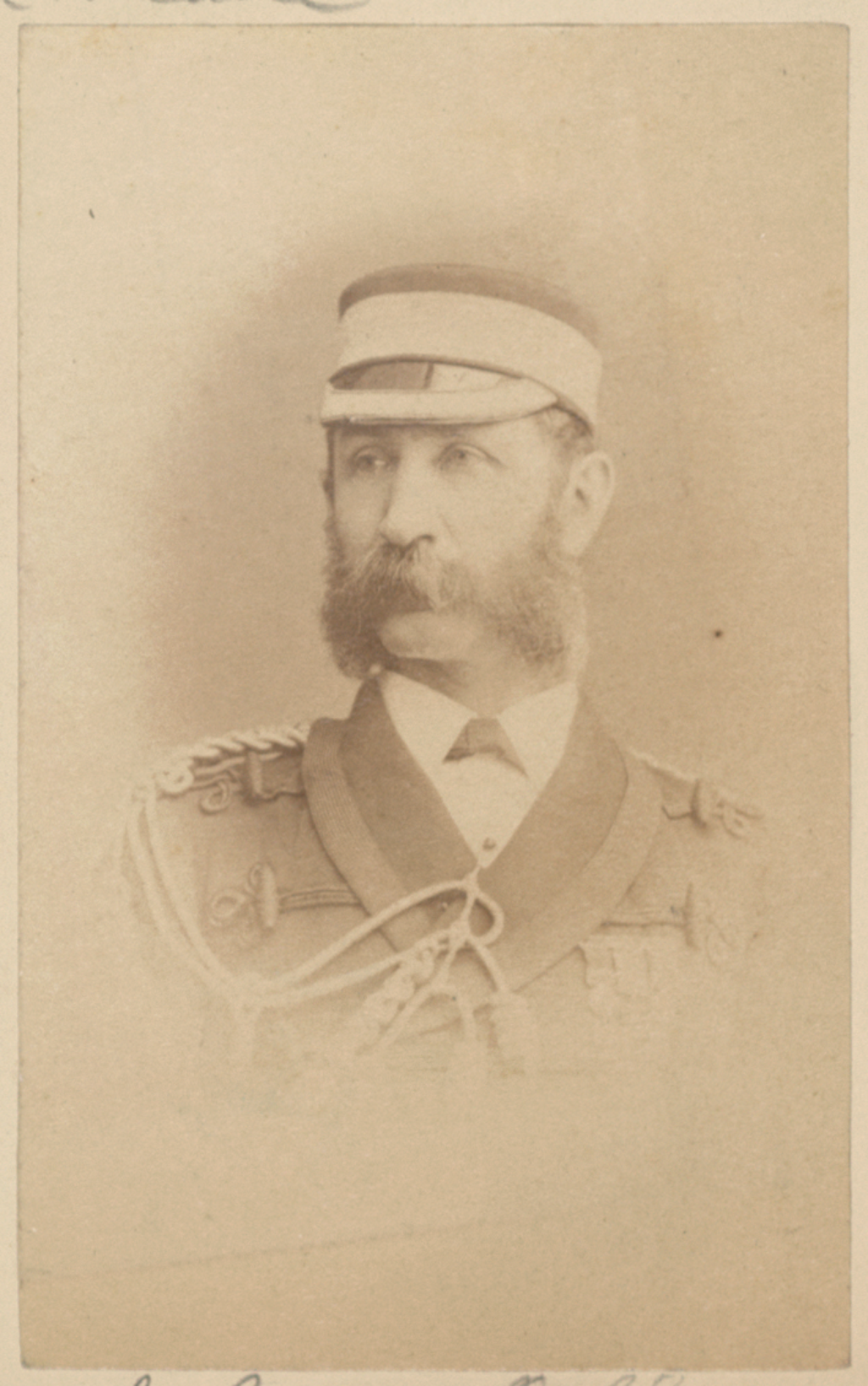
Sir George Colley during the Second Anglo-Afghan War

Colley served nearly all of his military and administrative career in British South Africa, but he played a significant part in the Second Anglo-Afghan War as military secretary and then private secretary to the governor-general of India, Lord Lytton. The war began in November 1878 and ended in May 1879 with the Treaty of Gandamak. After the war, Colley returned to South Africa, became high commissioner for South Eastern Africa in 1880, and died a year later at the Battle of Majuba Hill during the First Boer War.

== First Boer War ==
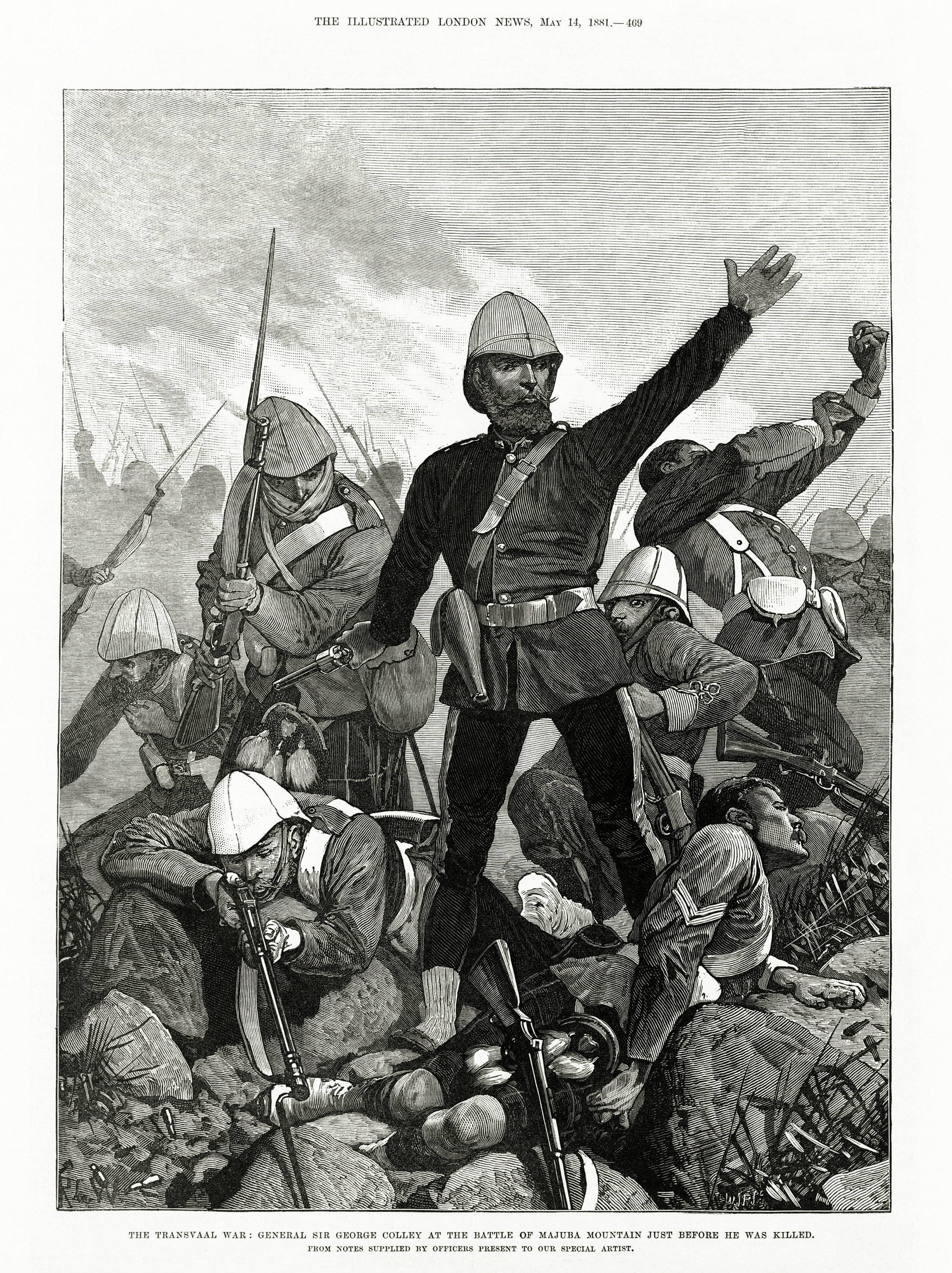
Sir George Pomeroy Colley at the Battle of Majuba Hill

Gladstone, the incoming Liberal Prime Minister was convinced that Beaconfieldism had alienated the Boers. To soften the blow of annexation by the British Empire, he resolved to decentralise a form of local government to the Transvaal Boers. This would be administered to them by the Governor-General of the Cape, Sir Bartle Frere, and the new Governor of the Natal, Major-General Sir George Colley. On 24 April 1880, he was appointed to the Natal command, with the rank of major-general, succeeding Sir Garnet Wolseley as governor and commander-in-chief in Natal, and high commissioner for South-eastern Africa. The close of that year found affairs in the Transvaal, which had been annexed since 1877, in a very critical state.

On 'Dingan's Day', 16 December 1880, a Boer republic was proclaimed at Heidelberg, Transvaal. Colley telegraphed London to express doubt that a Boer revolt was unlikely. The Liberal Government was in disarray: while left-leaning MPs called on the cabinet and colonial office to withdraw from the Transvaal and 'end the war', the Queen's Speech indicated that Her Majesty required imperial authority be restored. Yet within the new year, Colley found himself compelled to take immediate measures for the relief of the small garrisons of British troops scattered throughout that territory, and those already besieged. With the small force available, about fifteen hundred men, he at once proceeded to the extreme northern border of Natal, and in the course of January had several conflicts with the Boer forces, the principal being at Battle of Laing's Nek and Ingogo Heights, the former of which was unsuccessful.

On 17 February 1881, Sir Evelyn Wood, who had been appointed second in command, arrived at Newcastle with some additional troops, afterwards returning to Pietermaritzburg, and on 26 February, by a night march, Colley, with part of the troops, occupied, after an arduous climb of eight hours, a height known as Majuba, with a commanding view overlooking the Boer camp. The next morning, Colley was informed Boers were advancing on the British position. He took no action until subordinates impressed upon him the seriousness of the situation. Engaging at range, they picked off the British, Colley being shot dead by a rifle bullet through the forehead. As Edward Mahon, Surgeon, later explained to Sir George's brother Henry: 'I saw him [the General] near the centre of the plateau on the top of the hill. They [the Boers] asked me to identify him, and this I did. He was only wounded once, and that through the top of the skull. Death must have been instantaneous. From the direction of the wound, he must have been facing the Boers when hit.'

On the same day, London received a cable that Colley had been killed. The Prime Minister was ill in bed when he received the news, which he referred to as "The Hand of Judgment?" and interpreted as a punishment for his Africa policy.

External image
- Grave of Sir George Pomeroy Colley at Mount Prospect military cemetery, South Africa. (Genealogical Society of South Africa)

He is buried at Mount Prospect Cemetery, Natal. Colley's death persuaded the Imperial government to act, to reassert its authority. The Queen urged the negotiating convention to avoid "troubles" in South Africa. In August the Pretoria session opened, and a British Resident was proposed as a permanent Crown representative in which was described as "an illusionist's trick". The Volksraad would have to ratify the convention's proceedings if the Boer republic was to accept its own freedom reinforcing their own volkisch, nationhood and identity. "The government", said Gladstone, sought to "signalise itself by walking in the plain and simple ways of right and justice, and which desires never to build up an empire except in the happiness of the governed." Lord Salisbury was disgusted by the convention, demanding that the empire's suzerainty was immediately enforced. Colley's defeat and death highlighted the strains and tensions between empire and the governed, local governance and an Imperial Parliament.

== Family ==
Colley married, in 1878, Edith, daughter of Major General H. Meade Hamilton, CB. They had no children but, by his marriage to Elizabeth Wingfield, Sir George's brother Henry FitzGeorge Colley was the father of ten children.
