= Floreat Etona! =

1882 painting by Elizabeth Thompson

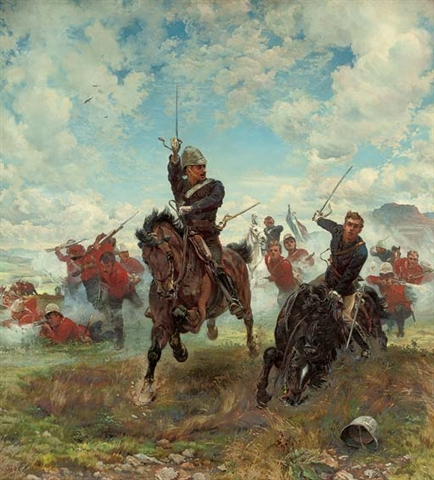
- Artist: Elizabeth Thompson, Lady Butler
- Year: 1882
- Medium: Oil-on-canvas
- Subject: Two soldiers during the Battle of Laing's Nek, 28 January 1881
- Dimensions: 84.4 cm × 78.1 cm (33.2 in × 30.7 in)
- Owner: Private collection

Floreat Etona! is an 1882 painting by Elizabeth Thompson, Lady Butler. The title is the motto of Eton College, "may Eton flourish". The painting depicts an incident that took place in 1881, during the First Boer War. It is held now in a private collection.

The work depicts Lieutenant Robert Elwes of the Grenadier Guards, who was killed at the Battle of Laing's Nek on 28 January 1881. The British Army was attempting to force its way through a pass in the Drakensberg Mountains, when Elwes joined a hopeless frontal assault into the teeth of a formidable Boer defence, charging up a hill on horseback. He reportedly encouraged another Eton old boy, adjutant of the 58th Regiment of Foot, with a shout of "Come along Monck! Floreat Etona! We must be in the front rank!" immediately before he was shot and killed. Elwes was one of 83 killed and 11 wounded. Monck survived the battle.

The painting shows two mounted British officers in blue patrol jackets, their swords drawn, leading red-coated infantry in a charge towards the viewer. The horse to the right (bearing Monck) is stumbling, and the officer to the left (Elwes) shouts encouragement. In the background, a Queen's Colour is visible (this attack was the last time a British battalion carried its colours into action) along with the flat-topped mountain of Majuba in Natal.

The painting measures 84.4 × 78.1 centimetres (33.2 × 30.7 in). It was shown at the Royal Academy's Summer Exhibition of 1882 at Burlington House. Unusually for Lady Butler, the painting was not a critical success, perhaps because it commemorates a minor and unsuccessful incident in an unregarded war. Some critics thought the painting was too sentimental.

The painting was sold at Christie's in London in June 2007 for £50,400.
