= Johannes Hermanus Grobler =

Boer politician

President of the Executive Council of the South African Republic

Acting
- In office 15 September – 6 December 1860
- Preceded by: Marthinus Wessel Pretorius
- Succeeded by: Stephanus Schoeman

Personal details
- Born: 23 December 1795 Tulbagh, Cape of Good Hope
- Died: 28 May 1876 (aged 80) Waterval, Transvaal Republic
- Resting place: Heroes' Acre, Pretoria

Johannes Hermanus Grobler (23 December 1795 – 28 May 1876) was a Boer politician who served as the acting President of the Executive Council of the South African Republic from 15 September until 6 December 1860.

== Life ==
Grobler was the brother-in-law of Andries Potgieter, a leader of the Great Trek and thus he followed him in 1838 into the Transvaal region. He was the first Landdrost in both Potchefstroom as well as Ohrigstad and in 1852 he was one of the signatories of the Sand River Convention, which recognised Transvaal independence from Britain. He was elected to Volksraad, and served several times as the Chairman of Volksraad.

=== Presidency ===
In 1860, Grobler became the acting President of the Executive Council of the South African Republic due to the declaration by the Volksraad (parliament) that Marthinus Wessel Pretorius was not allowed to be the simultaneous president of the South African Republic as well as the Orange Free State. In December of the same year, Grobler was ousted in a coup d'état by Stephanus Schoeman which was the catalyst for the Transvaal Civil War which eventually led to the defeat of Schoeman by Paul Kruger.

Grobler died in 1876 on his farm called Waterval in the Rustenburg District of the ZAR.

== See also ==
- List of presidents of the South African Republic
