= Battle of Majuba Hill =

1881 final battle of the First Boer War

- Part of the First Boer War
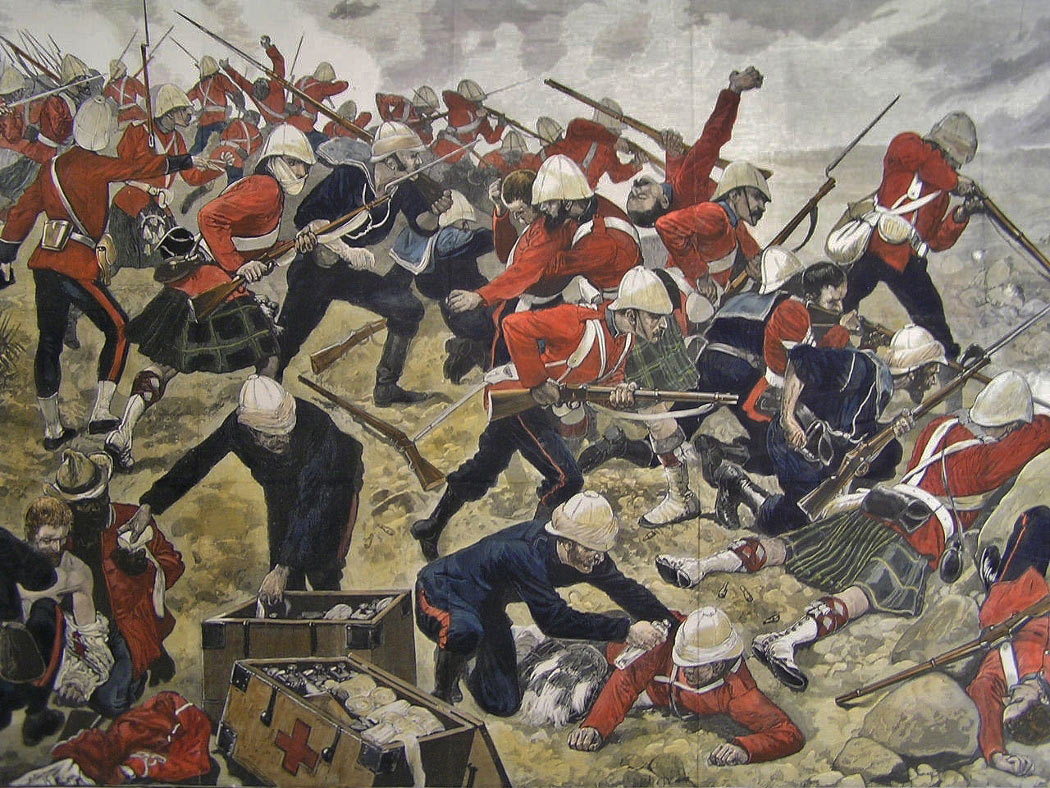
- An illustration of the battle, showcasing the British Army in action against the Boers.
| Date | 27 February 1881 |
| Location | Majuba Hill, Charlestown, Natal 27.4768°S 29.8505°E |
| Result | Boer victory |

Belligerents
| South African Republic | United Kingdom |

Commanders and leaders
| Piet Joubert; Nicolaas Smit; Stephanus Roos; Daniel J.K. Malan; Joachim Ferreira | Maj Gen. Sir George Pomeroy Colley † |

Strength
| 400 | 405 |

Casualties and losses
| 1 killed 5 wounded | 92 killed 134 wounded 59 captured |

The Battle of Majuba Hill on 27 February 1881 was the final and decisive battle of the First Boer War that was a resounding victory for the Boers. The British Major General Sir George Pomeroy Colley occupied the summit of the hill on the night of 26–27 February 1881. Colley's motive for occupying Majuba Hill, near Volksrust, now in South Africa, may have been anxiety that the Boers would soon occupy it themselves, since he had witnessed their trenches being dug in the direction of the hill.

The Boers believed that he might have been attempting to outflank their positions at Laing's Nek. The hill was not considered to be scalable by the Boers for military purposes and so it may have been Colley's attempt to emphasise British power and strike fear into the Boer camp.

The battle is considered by some to have been one of the "most humiliating" defeats suffered by the British in their military history.

== Battle ==
The bulk of the 405 British soldiers occupying the hill were 171 men of the 58th Regiment (two companies) with 141 men (three companies) of the 92nd Gordon Highlanders, and a small naval brigade from HMS Dido. Each man carried 70 rounds of ammunition, a full water bottle, three days' rations, a waterproof sheet, and a greatcoat. Two companies of the 60th Rifles (King's Royal Rifle Corps) who had accompanied the column stayed on the slopes as pickets and to guard the lines of communication. General Colley had brought no artillery up to the summit and did not order his men to dig in, against the advice of several of his subordinates (possibly because each company had four picks and six shovels), since he expected that the Boers would retreat when they saw their position on the Nek was untenable. They also brought a heliograph, which they used to send some signals to the camp. However, the Boers quickly formed a group of storming parties, led by Nicolaas Smit, from an assortment of volunteers from various commandos, totaling at least 450 men to attack the hill.

The physical conformation of Majuba's summit created a critical tactical vulnerability. The slopes leading to the crest were convex rather than concave, meaning that defenders positioned on the rim could not see the ground immediately below them. General Wood's subsequent investigation found that a soldier kneeling on the summit could seldom see more than 50 yards to his front. In some sectors, up to 400 yards of the ascent lay completely invisible to the British line. These blind zones, termed "dead ground," allowed the Boer storming parties to climb the final stretch of the mountain almost entirely unseen. To observe or fire into these areas, British troops would have needed to stand and lean over the edge of the crest, exposing themselves to accurate rifle fire from Boer marksmen positioned at the base of the hill.

By daybreak at 4:30, the 92nd Highlanders covered a wide perimeter of the summit, and a handful occupied Gordon's Knoll on the right side of the summit. Oblivious to the presence of the British troops until the 92nd Gordon Highlanders began to yell and to shake their fists, the Boers began to panic for fear of an artillery attack. The Boer assault employed a coordinated two-tiered approach that exploited the dead ground to devastating effect. Older, experienced marksmen remained stationed at the base of the hill and on lower ridges, maintaining accurate long-range fire at distances of 800 to 1,200 yards. Because the British troops were silhouetted against the sky, they presented easy targets. This suppressive fire pinned the defenders down and made it suicidal for any man to raise his head to observe the slopes below.

Under cover of this barrage, younger Boer volunteers formed storming parties of approximately 180 to 200 men. These groups advanced up the mountain through the dead ground, using rocks and scrub for concealment. The long-range marksmen kept British heads down while the climbing parties ascended unopposed through terrain the defenders could neither see nor safely fire into. Three Boer storming groups of 100–200 men each began a slow advance up the hill, led by Field Cornet Stephanus Roos, Commandant D.J.K. Malan and Commandant Joachim Ferreira. The Boers, the better marksmen, kept their enemy on the slopes at bay while groups crossed the open ground to attack Gordon's Knoll, where, at 12:45, Ferreira's men opened up a tremendous fire on the exposed knoll and captured it. The Boer general Piet Joubert later noted that the British rifles were sighted at 400–600 yards while the battle raged at about 50–100 yards, as the British officers had not told the troops to alter their weapons. Thus, they shot downhill over the heads of the exposed Boer attackers.

Colley was in his tent when he was informed of the advancing Boers but took no immediate action until after he had been warned by several subordinates of the seriousness of the attack. Lieutenant Ian Hamilton of the 92nd Highlanders, stationed on the perimeter, detected the Boer advance as the storming parties drew closer. He reported the enemy's proximity and growing numbers four separate times during the morning. Three of these warnings went directly to General Colley. The fourth went to Major Hay. Hamilton urged that the Boers were massing for an assault directly below his position. Colley appeared unalarmed and did not order a counter-attack or reinforcement of the threatened sector. At one point, Hamilton was reportedly told to "keep quiet." No significant action was taken in response to these warnings before the Boer storming parties crested the ridge.

Over the next hour, the Boers poured over the top of the British line and engaged the British at long range. Refusing close-combat action, they picked off the British soldiers one by one. The British reserves stationed in the central hollow for protection found their position reversed once the Boers seized the rim. The saucer-shaped basin that had offered shelter from long-range fire now lay exposed to plunging shots from above. Boer marksmen on the captured high ground could fire down into the hollow while remaining protected by rocks on the skyline. The reserve troops, caught in the open without any fortified position to fall back into, came under fire from their flank and rear. The safety zone had become a killing ground. When the front line broke and retreating soldiers poured into the hollow, they collided with reserves already under attack, creating the confusion and panic that turned retreat into rout.

The Boers could take advantage of the scrub and high grass that covered the hill, which the British were not trained to do. It was at that stage that British discipline began to break: the troops could not see their opponents and received very little direction from their officers, and they panicked and began to flee. When more Boers were seen encircling the mountain, the British line collapsed, and many ran pell-mell from the hill. The Gordons held their ground the longest, but once they were broken, the battle was over. The Boers were able to launch an attack, which shattered the-already crumbling British line.

Amid great confusion and increasing slaughter among his men, Colley attempted a fighting retreat, but he was killed by Boer marksmen. The rest of the British force fled down the rear slopes of Majuba, where more were hit by the Boer marksmen firing from the summit. An abortive rearguard action was staged by the 15th Hussars and 60th Rifles, who had marched from a support base at Mount Prospect, but that made little impact on the Boer forces. A total of 285 British were killed, captured or wounded, including Captain Cornwallis Maude, son of government minister Cornwallis Maude, 1st Earl de Montalt.

Several wounded soldiers who soon found themselves surrounded by Boer soldiers gave their accounts later of that day. Many Boers were young farm boys armed with rifles. The revelation that professionally trained soldiers were defeated by young farmboys led by a smattering of older soldiers proved to be a major blow to Britain's prestige and negotiating position in the treaty that ended the war.

== Aftermath ==
Although small in numbers, the battle is historically significant for three reasons:

- It led to the signing of a peace treaty and later the Pretoria Convention between the British and the reinstated South African Republic that ended the First Boer War.
- The fire and movement ("vuur en beweging" in Afrikaans) tactics employed by the Boers, especially Commandant Nicolas Smit in his final assault on the hill, were years ahead of their time.
- Coupled with the defeats at Laing's Nek and Schuinshoogte, this third crushing defeat at the hands of the Boers created a fearsome legend in the minds of the British lasting through the Second Boer War, when "Remember Majuba" became a rallying cry.

Some British historians have argued that the defeat marked the beginning of the decline of the British Empire. The First Boer War was the first time since the Revolutionary War that Britain was forced into either acknowledging the independence of a prewar possession or signing a treaty on unfavorable terms that yielded a significant amount of territory. In preceding conflicts, even if they suffered initial defeats, instances of the British not ultimately obtaining a decisive victory were very rare. Since British foreign policy discouraged negotiating from anything other than a position of strength, Majuba was the first time that Britain was defeated in the final engagements of a war. That position neglects that the First Boer War, while arguably Britain's first unambiguous defeat since the American Revolution, was largely unnoticed by the general public. Britain was spared much of the embarrassment of defeat through the original terms ending the war.

Under the 1881 Pretoria Convention, the British monarch became Head of state in the Transvaal, which was declared a self-governing, not an independent entity, under British suzerainty. Although that was never more than a legal fiction, soon abrogated by the 1884 London Convention, Britain could still formally deny its defeat. Prior to the discovery of gold in the Transvaal in 1886, it was widely presumed that the Transvaal Republic would not survive economically in the long term anyway. Furthermore, emerging powers, such as the United States, were already acting in open defiance of British hegemony at the time, and there is little evidence Britain's defeat in the brief low-intensity conflict had any significant effect on the foreign relations of the British Empire. The First Anglo-Boer War can at best be called a temporary setback for the British Empire, which would continue to expand for several decades and eventually recover all territory lost in 1881 during the Second Boer War (1899–1902).

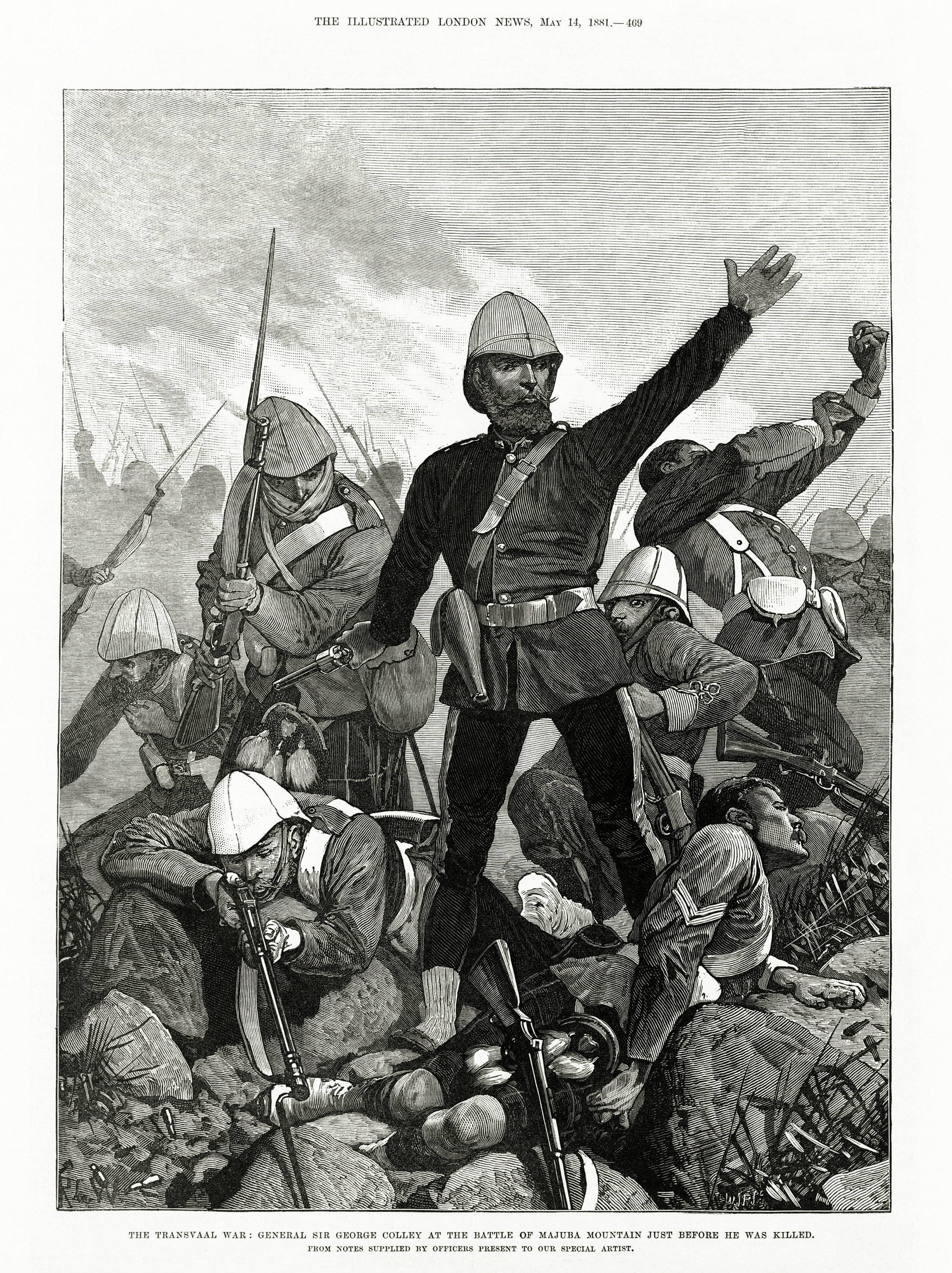
Sir George Pomeroy Colley at the Battle of Majuba Hill.

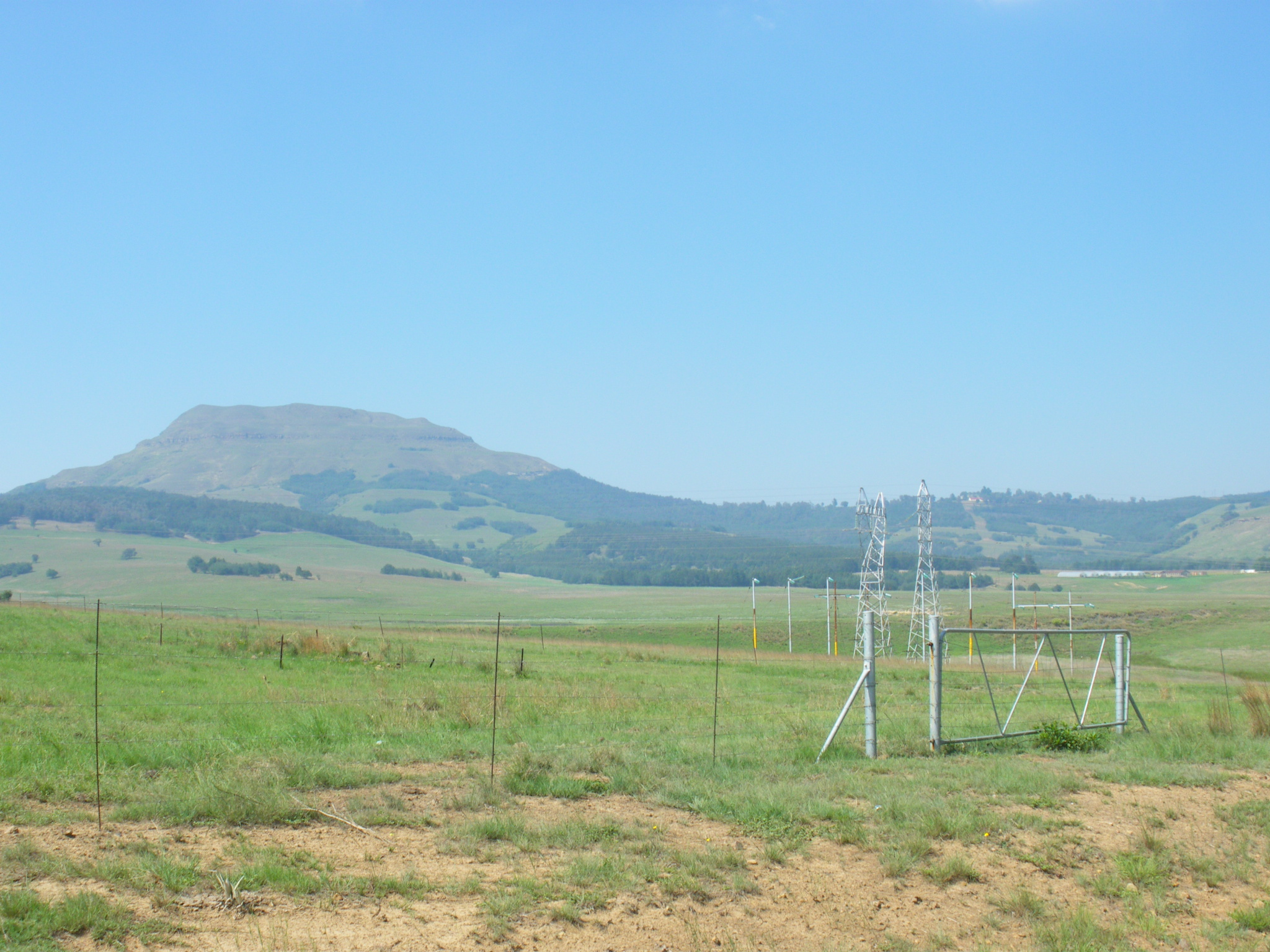
Majuba Hill seen from Laing's Nek; buildings on the right include the museum.
