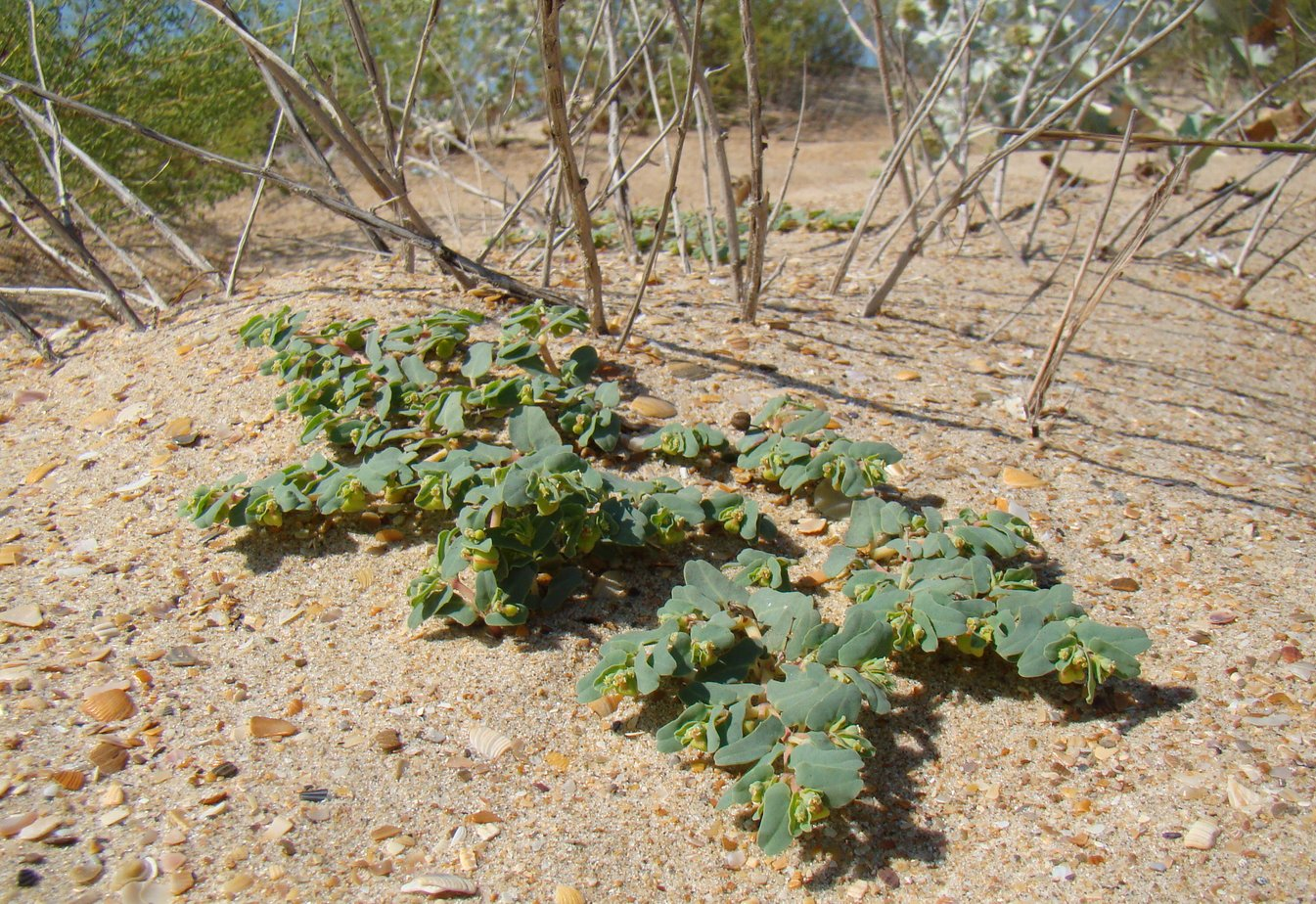

Scientific classification
- Kingdom: Plantae
- Clade: Tracheophytes
- Clade: Angiosperms
- Clade: Eudicots
- Clade: Rosids
- Order: Malpighiales
- Family: Euphorbiaceae
- Genus: Euphorbia
- Species: E. peplis

Binomial name
- Euphorbia peplis L.

= Euphorbia peplis =

Species of flowering plant

Euphorbia peplis, the purple spurge, is a species of Euphorbia, native to southern and western Europe, northern Africa, and southwestern Asia, where it typically grows on coastal sand and shingle.

== Description ==
A small, prostrate, hairless annual plant, the stems growing to 10–20 cm (4–8 in) long, typically with four stems from the base. The leaves are opposite, oval, 1–2 cm (0.4–0.8 in) long, grey-green, somewhat fleshy, reddish-purple veined, with oblique bases and a somewhat curved and wavy shape. Fruit capsules hairless, containing smooth 3mm seeds.

== Habitat ==
Sandy sea-shores, rarely inland.

== Range ==
Shores of the Mediterranean, Black, Caspian and Red Seas, Persian Gulf, Ireland (PoWo Map)

At the northern edge of its range in England, it has always been rare, and is now extinct.
