= Nicolaas Smit =

South African politician (1837–1896)

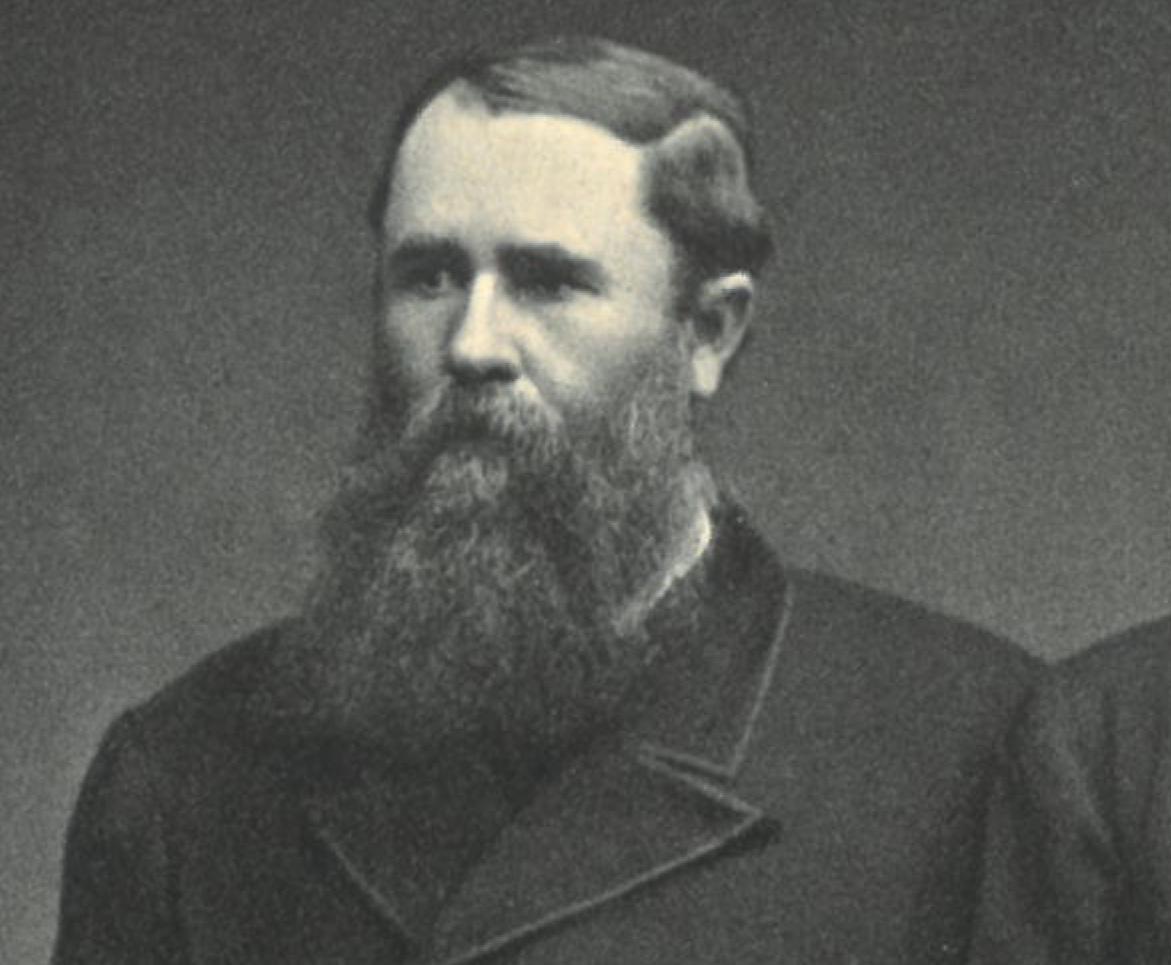
- Born: 30 May 1837; Doornbos, South Africa
- Died: 4 April 1896 (aged 58); Pretoria, South Africa
- Relatives: Nicolaas Van der Merwe
- Military career
- Allegiance: South African Republic
- Branch: Military
- Service years: 1860-90
- Rank: General
- Commands: Transvaal Commandos
- Conflicts: First Boer War: Battle of Schuinshoogte; Battle of Majuba Hill
- Awards: Order of the Red Eagle (Prussia) Order of the Netherlands Lion (the Netherlands)
- Other work: Vice State President of the South African Republic 1888-1896

General Nicolaas Jacobus Smit (5 May 1837 – 4 April 1896) was a Boer general and politician. During the First Boer War, he led Boer forces to victory during the Battle of Majuba Hill. He served as Vice State President of the South African Republic from 1887 and served until his death.

== Early years ==
The son of Nicolaas Jacobus Smit (1811-1887) and Elizabeth Magdalena Van der Merwe (1815-1892), the young Nicolaas was born at Doornbos, near Graaf Reinet. The family was descended from the first Dutch Calvinist immigrants, who, having arrived at the Cape before 1688, were among the first white settlers on the continent. At age 25 he moved to Natal with his parents. They lived in Durban for a while but disliked English society. Smit decided to join the army and eventually entered the veldt with a group of comrades.

== Later life and military career ==
Smit settled on a Sheepmor farm with his family in 1873. He also acquired the lease of a head of cattle in the Ngwenya Hills, northwest of Forbes Reef. By this time he had been promoted to lieutenant-general and seen action alongside the Pedi under Chief Sekhukane, who had been sent to ally with the Boer Republic. He proved to be an adept commander of mobile units. At the Battle of Ingogo Heights, he and 200 soldiers managed to hold off an opposing force three times as strong in atrocious weather conditions.

At the Battle of Majuba Hill, Smit showed bold and courageous leadership, directing his unit to move uphill in the teeth of enemy fire while using the contours of the land for protection. Their khaki uniforms, which blended into the background, and their knowledge of the country prevented the British from seeing their targets. The British had failed to dig in or protect their lines by trenches and had not brought artillery with their baggage trains, making defense of a hilltop position difficult. Unable to hold the line, they broke after the Boers captured their right flank position at Gordon's Knoll. General Smit's victory brought the Transvaal War to a swift conclusion. It enabled the Boer Republic to be established at the Pretoria Convention, which went unchallenged until the Second Boer War. The London Convention (1884), which superseded the Pretoria Convention and to which Smit was a signatory, ceded suzerainty to the Boers for all time.

For his courage and presence of mind on the battlefield, Smit was elected to political office. First, he was appointed as Vice State President of the South African Republic on 20 June 1887, and won subsequent elections, and served as Vice State President until his death. He did not live to see the declaration of independence by President Kruger.

== Marriages ==
Smit married Hendrika Stephina (1841-1894), daughter of Hendrik Stephanus Pretorius and Rachel Jacoba Liebenberg, at Rustenburg in April 1863. They had three sons and two daughters. In May 1895 he married Sussana Bosman, a widow.

== Awards ==
- Order of the Red Eagle (Prussia)
- Order of the Netherlands Lion (the Netherlands)

== Gallery ==
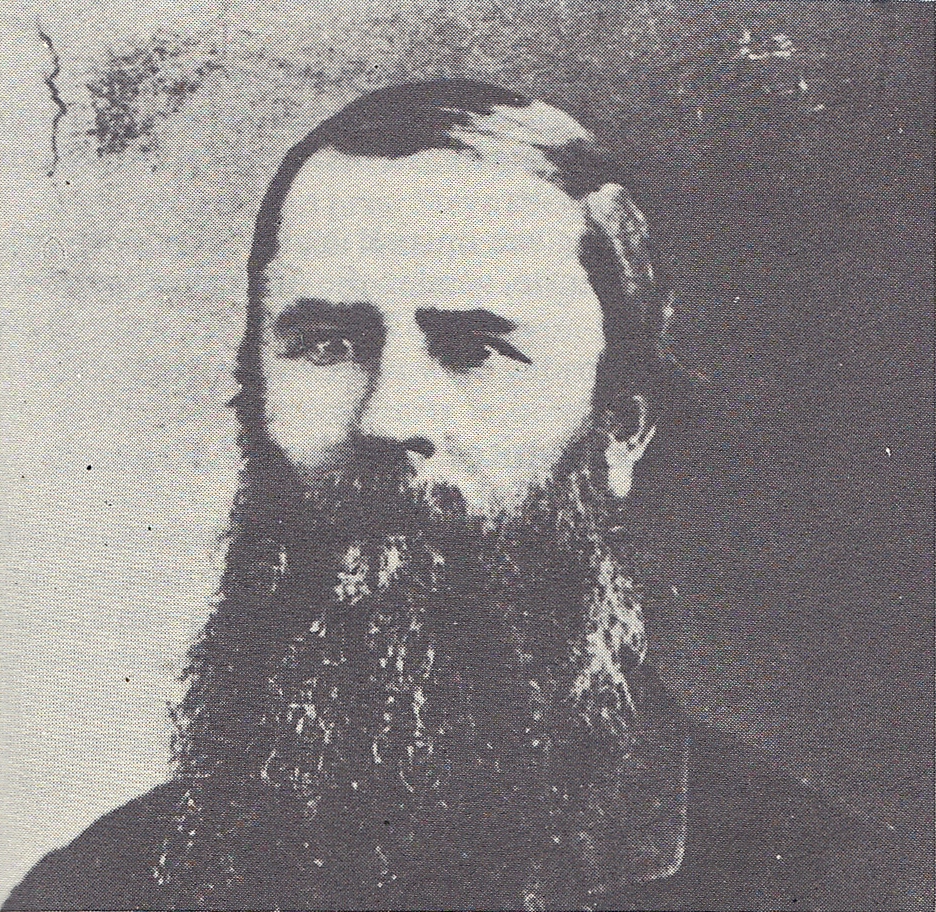
Nicolaas Jacobus Smit

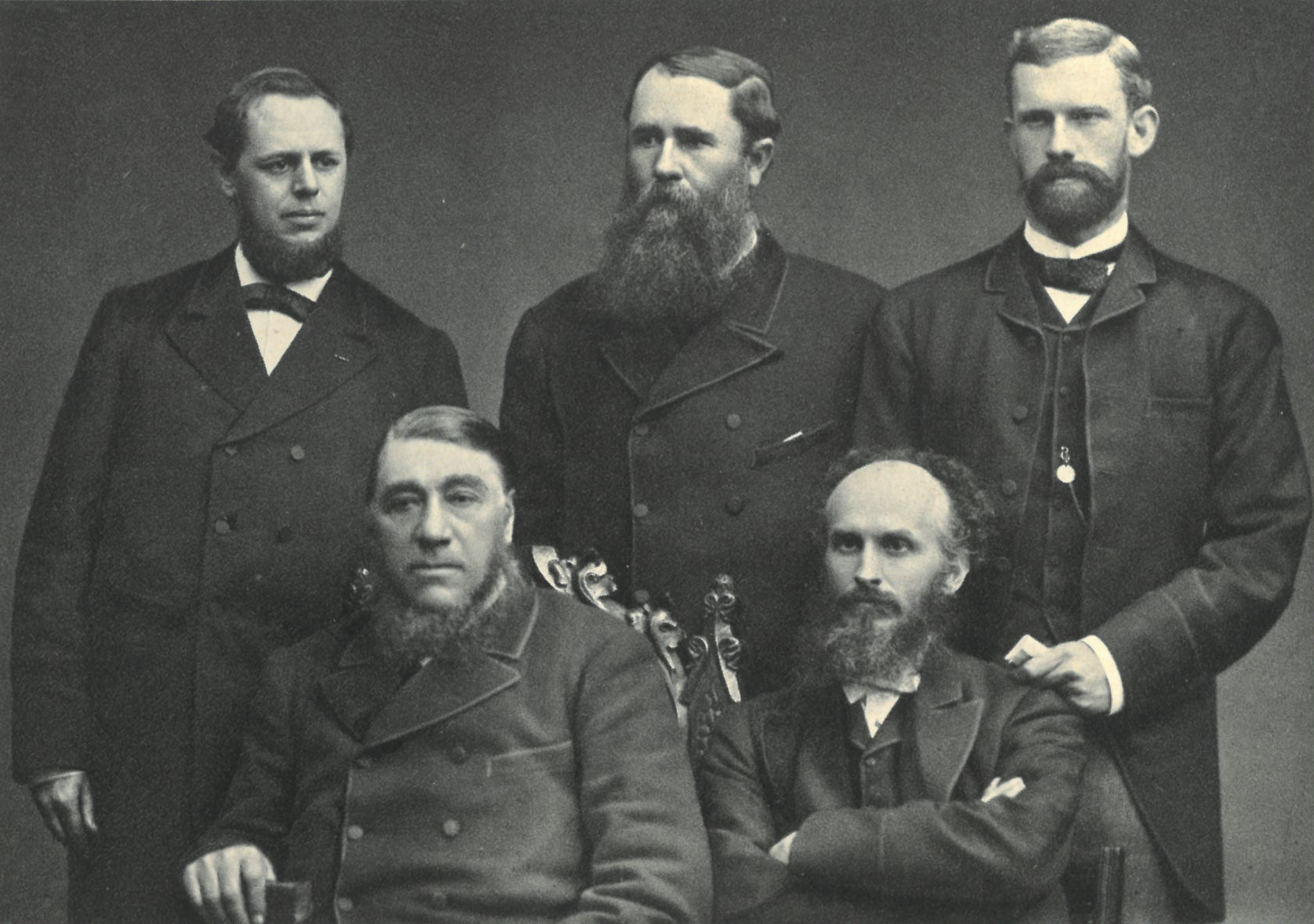
The Boer Delegates 1883-1884

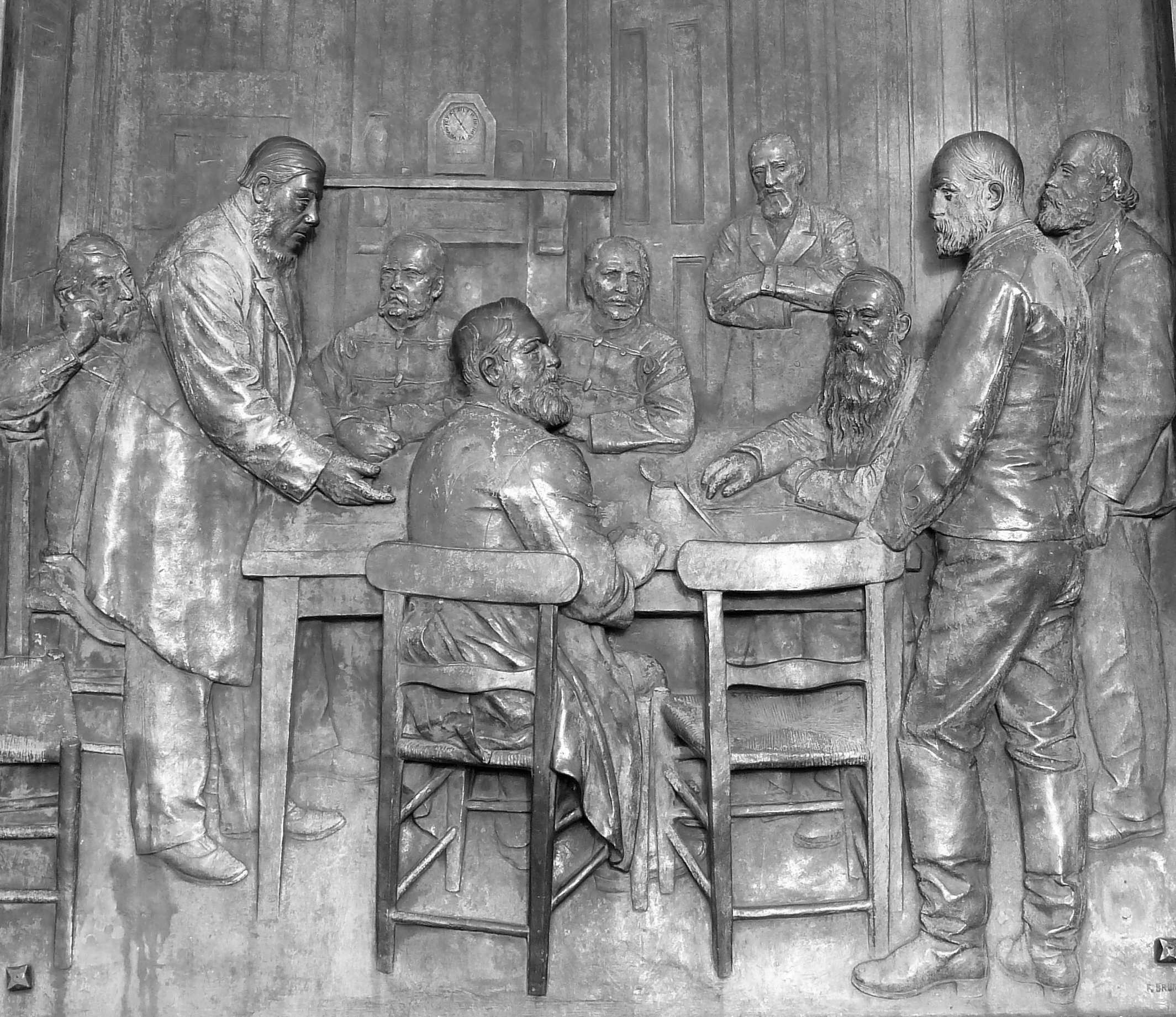
Western side panel of the Kruger statue in Pretoria
