= Cornelis Johannes Bodenstein =

Personal details
- Born: 4 November 1826 Beaufort West
- Died: 26 June 1885 (aged 58) Pretoria

Military service
- Allegiance: South African Republic

Cornelis Johannes Bodenstein (4 November 1826 – 26 June 1885) was a former member of the executive council and Vice State President of the South African Republic and president of the parliament, Volksraad.

He was born in Beaufort West on 4 November 1826. He was a son of Johannes Bodenstein who emigrated from Germany. In Natal, he became secretary to the Volksraad of Natalia Republic, and later served as magistrate. In 1845 his family emigrated from Colony of Natal to Transvaal. He had a career in public service. In 1858, he was assistant commandant in the campaign against Moshweshwe and later became commandant until he resigned in 1861. In 1863, he became a member of the court which tried certain cases out of the Transvaal civil war.

From 1869 until British annexation in 1877 Boddenstein was a member of Volksraad for Potchefstroom. He was elected as the president of the Volksraad in 1875. After restoration of the South African Republic independence in 1881 he was elected again as the president of Volksraad. He was re-elected as chairman until the end of 1884, when he resigned upon appointment as Vice State President of the South African Republic. He was appointed to succeed Piet Joubert who had resigned. However, Bodenstein was no longer in good health, and died on 26 June 1885.
