= Thomas Trench =

Thomas Trench (5 July 1763 – 7 January 1834) was an Anglican priest in Ireland at the end of 18th and the first decades of the 19th centuries.

Trench was born in County Galway and educated at Trinity College, Dublin. Trench was appointed 4th Canon of Kildare Cathedral on 27 July 1809; and Dean of Kildare on 7 August 1809. He was the brother of Frederick Trench, 1st Baron Ashtown. He died in post.
