= Volksraad (South African Republic) =

Abolished legislature of the South African Republic

Volksraad van die Zuid-Afrikaansche Republiek
- Coat of arms of the South African Republic

Type
- Type: Unicameral 1840–1890; Bicameral 1890–1902
- Houses: 1890–1902: First Volksraad Second Volksraad

History
- Established: 1840
- Disbanded: 31 May 1902
- Seats: 48 (24 First, 24 Second)

Meeting place
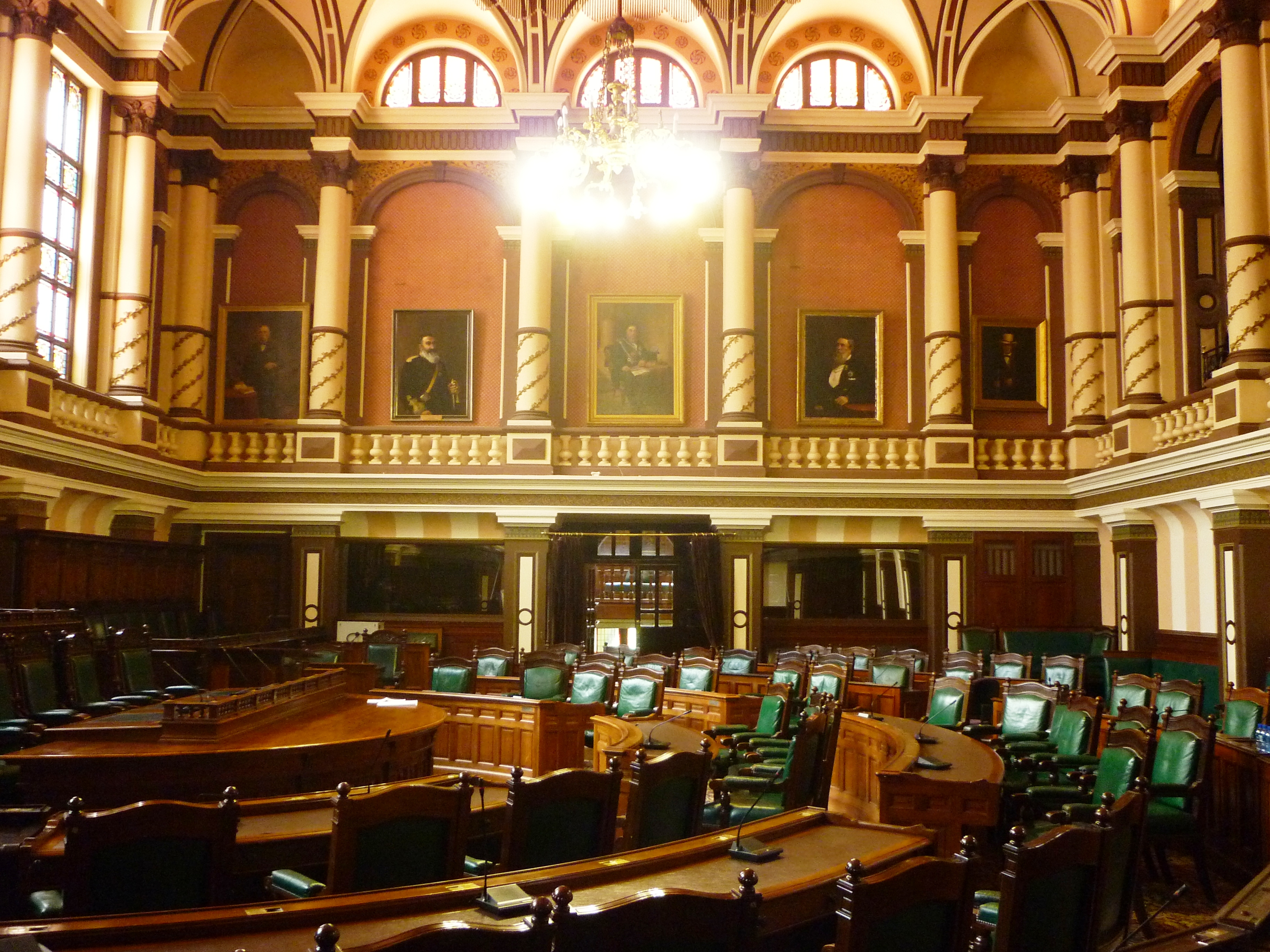
- Ou Raadsaal, Pretoria

The Volksraad of the South African Republic (English: "People's Council" of the South African Republic, Afrikaans: Volksraad van die Zuid-Afrikaansche Republiek) was the parliament of the former South African Republic (ZAR). It existed from 1840 to 1877, and from 1881 to 1902 in part of what is now South Africa. The body ceased to exist after the British Empire's victory in the Second Anglo-Boer War. The Volksraad sat in session in Ou Raadsaal in Church Square, Pretoria.

== Unicameral body ==
In 1840, at the beginning of the Natalia Republic, an adjunct Volksraad was created in Potchefstroom for settlers west of the Drakensberg. The Potchefstroom Volksraad continued despite the British annexation of the Natalia Republic in 1843. It eventually passed the Thirty-three Articles, the precursor to the 1858 constitution (Grondwet), in 1849. In 1858 the Grondwet permanently established the Volksraad as the supreme authority of the nation.

Volksraad was initially a unicameral body. It consisted of three members for each of the districts of Potchefstroom, Lydenburg, Rustenburg, Zoutpansberg, Pretoria, Wakkerstroom, Utrecht, Middelburg, Heidelberg, Waterberg, Marico, and Bloemhof, and one member for each of the towns of Potchefstroom, Lydenburg, Rustenburg, and Pretoria. The members had to be of European origin, over thirty years old, possessed real estate, never convicted of crime, member of a Protestant church, and voters in the Republic of at least three years.

Before 1873 the members were elected for two years, and half of the members retired every two years. The Volksraad met once a year in ordinary session.

== Bicameral body ==
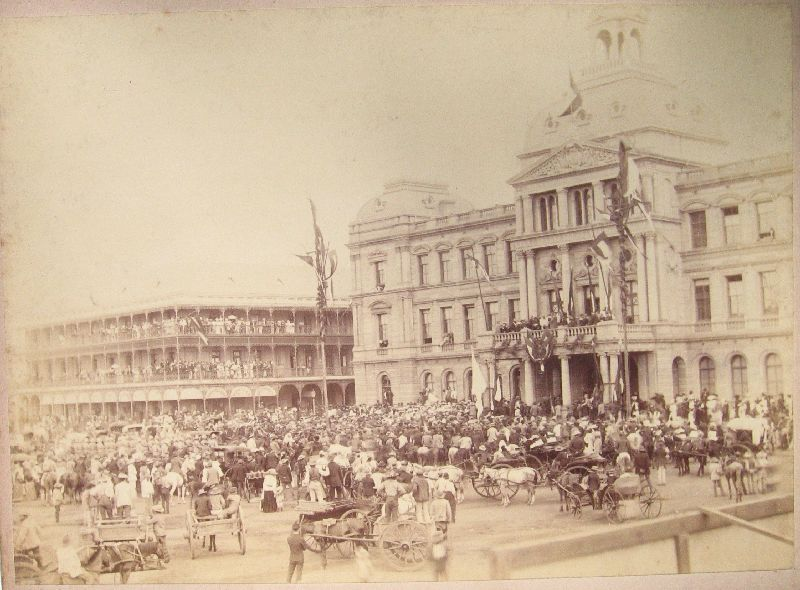
The Volksraad receiving President Paul Kruger at the Ou Raadsaal, circa 1890

Initially a unicameral body, the Volksraad was divided into two chambers in 1890 in order to keep Boer control over state matters while still giving Uitlanders (foreigners) — many of whom were temporarily employed in the mining industry — a say in local affairs, in order to fend off British complaints.

From 1890 the Volksraad consisted of two houses of 24 members each. The "Second Volksraad" had suffrage for all white males above 16 years, and had limited legislative powers in the fields of mining, road construction, copyright and certain commercial affairs, all subject to ratification by the "First Volksraad". This was the highest authority in charge of state policy, with preference being given to fully franchised burghers for appointment to government posts.

The members of the First Volkraad were elected for four years. First Volksraad members had to be born in the state.

The Second Volksraad, of the Uitlanders, was allegedly without power.

== Chairmen of the Volksraad 1844–1890 ==
The chairmen of the unicameral Volksraad (Voorzitter van den Volksraad).

- J. D. Van Coller, 1844
- Casper Jan Hendrik Kruger, 1 Aug 1845 - 8 Oct 1845
- Johannes Gerhardus Stephanus Bronkhorst, 11 Dec 1845 - 11 Dec 1845
- Johannes Hermanus Grobler, 20 Jan 1846 - 22 Jan 1846
- Andries Hendrik Potgieter, 27 Jan 1846 - 27 Jan 1846
- Johannes Gerhardus Stephanus Bronkhorst, 28 Feb 1846 - 28 Feb 1846
- Johannes Hermanus Grobler, 17 Mar 1846 - 19 Mar 1846
- Andries Hendrik Potgieter, 13 Apr 1846 - 16 May 1846
- Johannes Gerhardus Stephanus Bronkhorst, 8 Jun 1846 - 8 Jun 1846
- Johannes Hermanus Grobler, 1 Sep 1846 - 1 Sep 1846
- Joachim Prinsloo, 5 Nov 1846 - 5 Nov 1846
- Johannes Christiaan Klopper, 10 Dec 1846 - 10 Feb 1847
- Johannes Hermanus Grobler, 12 Mar 1847 - 12 Mar 1847
- Johannes Christiaan Klopper, 16 Mar 1847 - 16 Mar 1847
- Jan Frans Schutte, 29 Apr 1847 - 29 Apr 1847
- Johannes Christiaan Klopper, 5 May 1847 - 5 May 1847
- Joachim Prinsloo, 14 May 1847 - 14 May 1847
- Johannes Hermanus Grobler, 17 Jun 1847 - 17 Jun 1847
- Johannes van Renseburg, 21 Jun 1847 - 21 Jun 1847
- Louw Erasmus, 3 Nov 1847 - 4 Nov 1847
- Jan Frans Schutte, 15 Dec 1847 - 16 Dec 1847
- Johannes Hermanus Grobler, 4 Apr 1848 - 21 Apr 1848
- Jacob de Clercq, 7 Mar 1849 - 8 Mar 1849
- Andries Wilhelmus Jacobus Pretorius, 23 May 1849 - 25 May 1849
- Jacob de Clercq, 19 Sep 1849 - 19 Sep 1849
- Piet Ernst Kruger, 6 Dec 1849 - 12 Dec 1849
- WC Swart, 22 Jan 1850 - 30 Jan 1850
- Willem Hendrik Jacobsz, 26 May 1850 - 24 Aug 1850
- Cornelis Potgieter, 10 Sep 1850 - 16 Oct 1850
- Petrus Frans Jacobus Pretorius, 10 Dec 1850 - 10 Dec 1850
- Cornelis Potgieter, 15 Jan 1851 - 15 Feb 1851
- Willem Hendrik Jacobsz, 5 May 1851 - 9 May 1851
- JNH Grobler, 11 Jun 1851 - 11 Jun 1851
- Johannes Christoffel Steyn, 5 Jul 1851 - 5 Jul 1851
- Cornelis Potgieter, 1 Sep 1851 - 3 Sep 1851
- Willem Hendrik Jacobsz, 27 Nov 1851 - 29 Nov 1851
- Joachim Prinsloo, 12 Feb 1852 - 12 Feb 1852
- Pieter Ernst Kruger, 14 Feb 1852 - 14 Feb 1852
- Cornelis Potgieter, 17 Mar 1852 - 20 Mar 1852
- Cornelis Potgieter, 5 May 1852 - 6 May 1852
- Andreas Theodorus Spies, 6 May 1852 - 6 May 1852
- C Viljoen, 7 May 1852 - 7 May 1852
- Cornelis Potgieter, 15 Jun 1852 - 12 Jul 1852
- Joachim Prinsloo, 4 Oct 1852 - 4 Oct 1852
- Cornelis Potgieter, 15 Nov 1852 - 15 Nov 1852
- Joachim Prinsloo, 20 Nov 1852 - 20 Nov 1852
- Cornelis Potgieter, 14 Mar 1853 - 22 Jun 1853
- Henricus Albertus Pretorius, 9 Aug 1853 - 13 Aug 1853
- Cornelis Potgieter, 19 Sep 1853 - 10 Apr 1854
- Johannes Hermanus Grobler, 7 Jun 1854 - 15 Jun 1854
- Cornelis Potgieter, 16 Oct 1854 - 5 Jul 1855
- Henricus Albertus Pretorius, 10 Sep 1855 - 18 Sep 1855
- Johannes Hermanus Grobler, 5 Nov 1855 - 20 Nov 1855
- Cornelis Potgieter, 27 Nov 1855 - 27 Nov 1855
- Johannes Hermanus Grobler, 4 Mar 1856 - 11 Mar 1856
- Hendrik Teodor Bührmann, 11 Mar 1856 - 11 Mar 1856
- Johannes Hermanus Grobler, 27 May 1856 - 30 May 1856
- JP Furstenberg, 5 Jan 1857 - 6 Jan 1857
- Johannes Hermanus Grobler, 1857-?
- William Robinson (politician), ?-1858-?
- Maurits de Vries, 1867
- Maurits de Vries, 1872-1873
- Petrus Jacobus Joubert, 1873-1875
- Cornelis Johannes Bodenstein, 1875-1877
- British annexation as Transvaal Colony 1877-1880
- Cornelis Johannes Bodenstein, 1880-1884
- R. J. Smit, ?-1885-?
- J. J. Hoffman, ?-1886-?
- B. A. Kloppers, ?-1887-?
- W. J. Jacobs, ?-1890-?

== Chairmen of the First Volksraad 1890–1902 ==
The chairmen of the First Volksraad (Voorzitter van den Eersten Volksraad).

- Frederik Gerhardus Hendrik Wolmarans, 1890-1891
- P. A. Klopper, ?-1891-?
- Jacobus Marthinus Malan, ?-1894-?
- Schalk Willem Burger, 1895-1896
- T. N. de Villiers, ?-1897-?
- Frederik Gerhardus Hendrik Wolmarans, 1898-1899
- Lucas Johannes Meyer, 1899-1900-?

== Chairmen of the Second Volksraad 1890–1902 ==
The chairmen of the Second Volksraad (Voorzitter van den Tweede Volksraad).

- Hendrik Vermaas, 1891-?
- Jacobus Johannes Burger, ?-1892-1894-?
- Nicolaas Samuel Malherbe, ?-1894-1898-?
