= Battle of Mushroom Valley =

Part of the Maritz Rebellion (1914)

- Part of the Maritz Rebellion
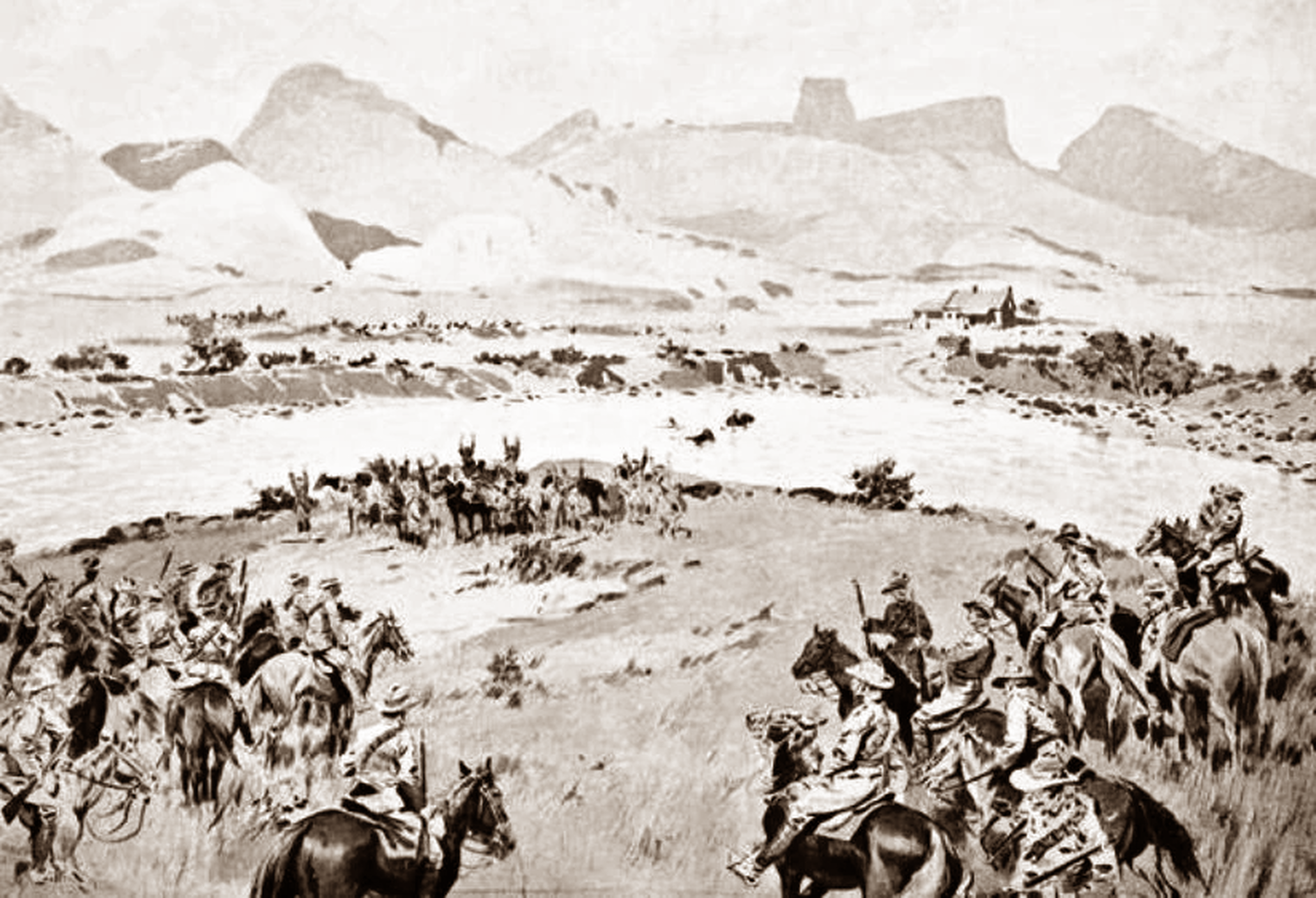
- South African General Christian Beyers troops surrender at the Vaal River, December 8, 1914.
Date	November 12, 1914
Location	18 miles (28.96 km) southeast of Winburg, Union of South Africa
Result	British victory

Belligerents
British Empire; Union of South Africa	South African Republic

Commanders and leaders
(Union of South Africa) Louis Botha (Union of South Africa) Tobias Smuts (Union of South Africa) Henry Lukin (Union of South Africa) Coen Brits (Union of South Africa) Col. Myburgh (Union of South Africa) Col. Brant	(South African Republic) Christiaan de Wet (South African Republic) Christian Beyers (South African Republic) Jan Kemp

Units involved
Union Defence Force	Various members of several Kommando units and Maritz sympathizers

Strength
~2,000 soldiers 2 Armored Cars; 2 Lewis Machine Guns; 2 Batteries of the Cape Field Artillery	2—3,000 Kommandos; 2 Cars; ~500 Horses

Casualties and losses
11 killed 24 wounded	22+ killed 22+ wounded 282-300 captured 500+ Horses captured

The Battle of Mushroom Valley (Afrikaans: Slag van Mushroom Valley) was a skirmish which occurred during the Maritz Rebellion on November 12, 1914, northeast of Bloemfontein and southwest of Winburg. The battle is noted as being the very last battle that Christiaan de Wet fought as the commander of a Boer commando.

== Background ==
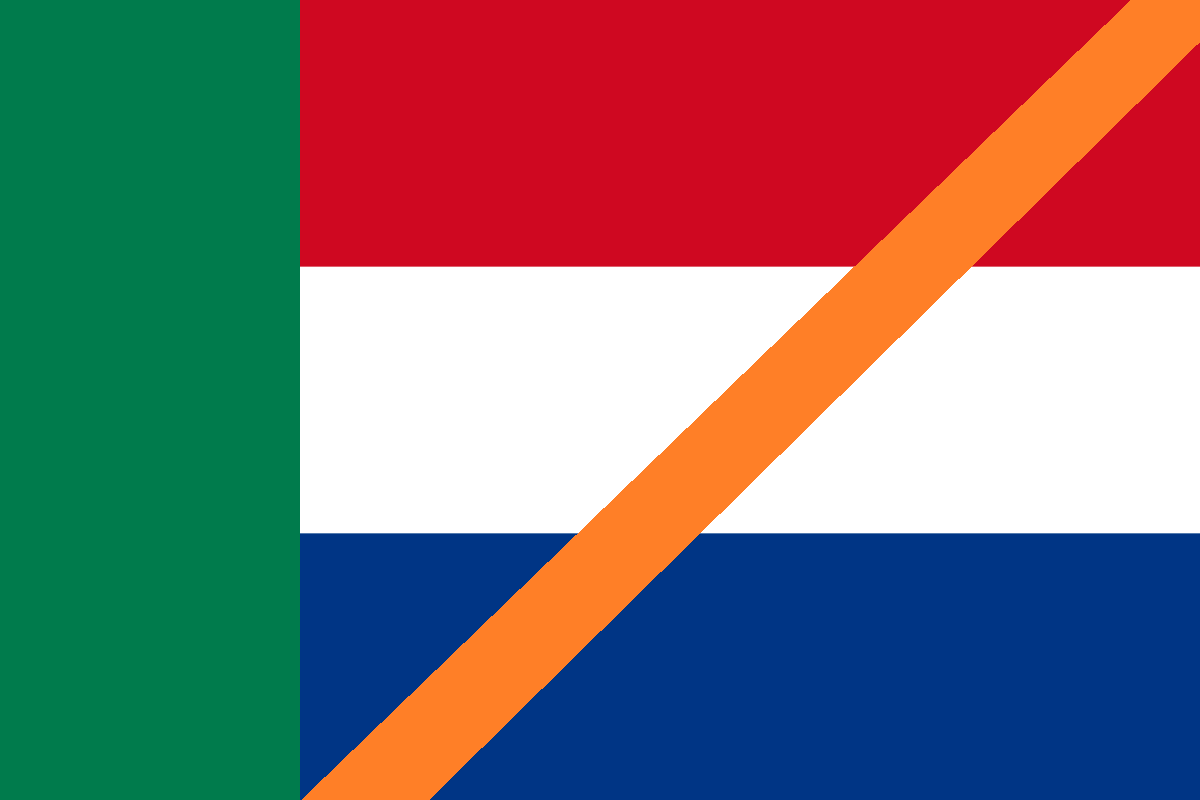
Flag of the Maritz Rebellion, 1914.

At the outbreak of the First World War the British Empire called upon many of its dominions for aid, one of them was the Union of South Africa. Many Boers including; General Koos de la Rey General Christiaan de Wet, Major Jan Kemp, Commandant-general Christiaan Frederik Beyers and Lieutenant colonel Manie Maritz opposed invading German South West Africa. In 1914 rumors began to circulate that the empire would begin conscription for all Afrikaner men which caused deep resentment and opposition amongst the Afrikaner populace. Both Beyers and Kemp promptly resigned from the Union Defence Force as a display of protest against the government's actions, similar to what had happened in Britain two years earlier in the Curragh incident over the Irish Home Rule Bill. Beyers and Kemp both joined the other Boer leaders urging Afrikaners into open rebellion against the British-aligned military and government.

In September, 1914 Maritz issued a proclamation on behalf of a provisional government. It stated that "the former South African Republic and Orange Free State as well as the Cape Province and Natal are proclaimed free from British control and independent, and every White inhabitant of the mentioned areas, of whatever nationality, are hereby called upon to take their weapons in their hands and realize the long-cherished ideal of a Free and Independent South Africa".

The government declared martial law on October 12, 1914, a week later on October 24, 1914, Maritz was defeated by Botha and fled to German South West Africa. Botha and Jan Smuts then turned their focus to several of the other Boer leaders of the rebellion, namely Christiaan de Wet, Christiaan Frederik Beyers, and Jan Kemp.

== Prelude to battle ==
On the evening of November 11, 1914 General Louis Botha gathered a large cavalry and motorized infantry force along with two artillery batteries of the Cape Field Artillery and left Winburg with the Transvaal commando of the Union Defence Force proceeding in the direction of Marquard in order to surround de Wet. de Wet was reported by British sources to be in a spot known as Mushroom Valley slightly northeast of Bloemfontein and southwest of Winburg. Colonel Brand, with another strong force, moved out from Winburg to Hoenderkop, and came up with a section rebels under Hendrik Serfontein, Brand's Union Defense Force commando consisted of roughly 1,300 men.

Botha's cordon was completed by General Henry Lukin who had recently been attacking Germans in German West Africa during the West African Campaign, alongside Colonel Coen Brits who had recently skirmished with Manie Maritz. Botha's plan was to drive de Wet's forces into a quarry close to Mushroom Valley an push de Wet's forces directly into Lukin and Brits and hopefully get de Wet to surrender. One noted failure on de Wet's part was the fact that he did not have his men cut the telephone line from Mushroom Valley to Winburg, making it easy for loyalist Afrikaners to inform Botha of De Wet's exact location. De Wet also failed to post centuries outside of his laager.

Many of Botha's troops were transported to the area by cars which were made available by the Transvaal Automobile Club among others, two of the cars were equipped with machine guns. It is citied by several sources that Botha's use of armored cars played a vital part in De Wet's defeat.

== Battle ==
The battle occurred on Tuesday November 12, 1914 around 7:30am 18 miles (28.96 km) southeast of Winburg. Botha had signaled his advanced guard to begin the attack with a heliograph, however, General Lukin failed to receive the message thinking it was an enemy trick. Botha eventually attacked De Wet's force of roughly 3,500 men and drove them headlong towards the direction of Koraanberg, however, Both was not able to completely surround De Wet's force into a pocket and failed to cut off the remainder of De Wet's mounted force which escaped through a corridor which was left open by Lukin due to the ignored heliograph message. de Wet's Kommando was almost completely destroyed during the battle, casualties were never officially counted, but de Wet's losses were very heavy. de Wet lost 100 carts and wagons along with two cars and 250 prisoners.

== Casualties ==
According to author Philip J. Sampson:

"The rebel losses in this fight were never published, but they were exceptionally heavy, due to the fact that the men with the two machine-guns quickly found the range and in less than ten minutes had scattered the veld with dead and wounded men and horses. It was this unexpected and terrible onslaught that set the burghers on the run, and although the machine-guns were quickly ordered to stop, De Wet's men could not be induced to stay and have the usual duel with the rifle".

Some statistics released by the Union Defence Force state: 6 UDF soldiers killed and 20 wounded, with 22 rebels killed in action and an unknown number wounded. A large number of wagons were captured and a number of rebels were also taken prisoner. Other sources indicate as many as 62 rebels being killed with 500 horses being captured along with all of de Wet's wagons, carts, stores, and ammunition. According to the South Africa War Graves Project only 14 total soldiers and rebels were killed during the battle: 11 UDF soldiers and 3 rebels. According to Eric Moore Ritchie's book With Botha in the Field "We lost six killed against the rebels' twenty-two, and with twenty wounded on our side the rebel losses were proportionate. We took upwards of three hundred prisoners, De Wet himself escaping by the merest fluke. He lost all his transport, and generally ceased after the action to be a serious menace". The majority of Botha's forces who were killed during the skirmish were part of Brant's UDF Commando.

Louis Botha's telegraph report on November 13, 1914, state's the following pertaining to casualties:

"Colonel-Commandant Myburgh and Colonel-Commandant Tobias Smuts moved with me from Winburg last evening on Bantry, and Colonel Brand later the same evening from Winburg on Hoenderkop. On arrival at our destinations at daybreak this morning, we found the enemy in strength, disposed as follows: -

A force under Rocco Villers at Bantry, another of De Wet's main body at Mushroom Valley, and a third, under Serfontein at Hoenderkop.

I engaged the two first-named forces, while Colonel Brand attacked the third. The result of the operations was the complete defeat and rout of the rebel forces. Our casualties were: -

Force under myself: One killed, C. Friend (Colonel Myburgh's adjutant); four wounded, J. H. Erasmus of Kinross (seriously); J. L. du Plessis, of Boshof (seriously); Uys of Zooppoort (dangerously); and L. A. Despensanie of Piet Retief (dangerously).

Force under Colonel Brand: Five killed (no details yet to hand): 16 wounded, including P. J. Clalitz (seriously, but not dangerously), E. G. Matthews (same condition), both belong to Commandant Fouche's commando.

The rebel casualties known so far are 22 killed, including Commandant Els of Heibron; wounded number unknown, but comparatively large and including Commandant Van Niekerk (very dangerously). We took 255 European prisoners, 27 native prisoners, and also captured a large number of horses, mules, Cape carts, trolleys, wagons, etc. Prisoners taken by De Wet, including Senator Stuart and the Magistrate of Winburg were taken and released by Colonel Brand".

== Aftermath ==
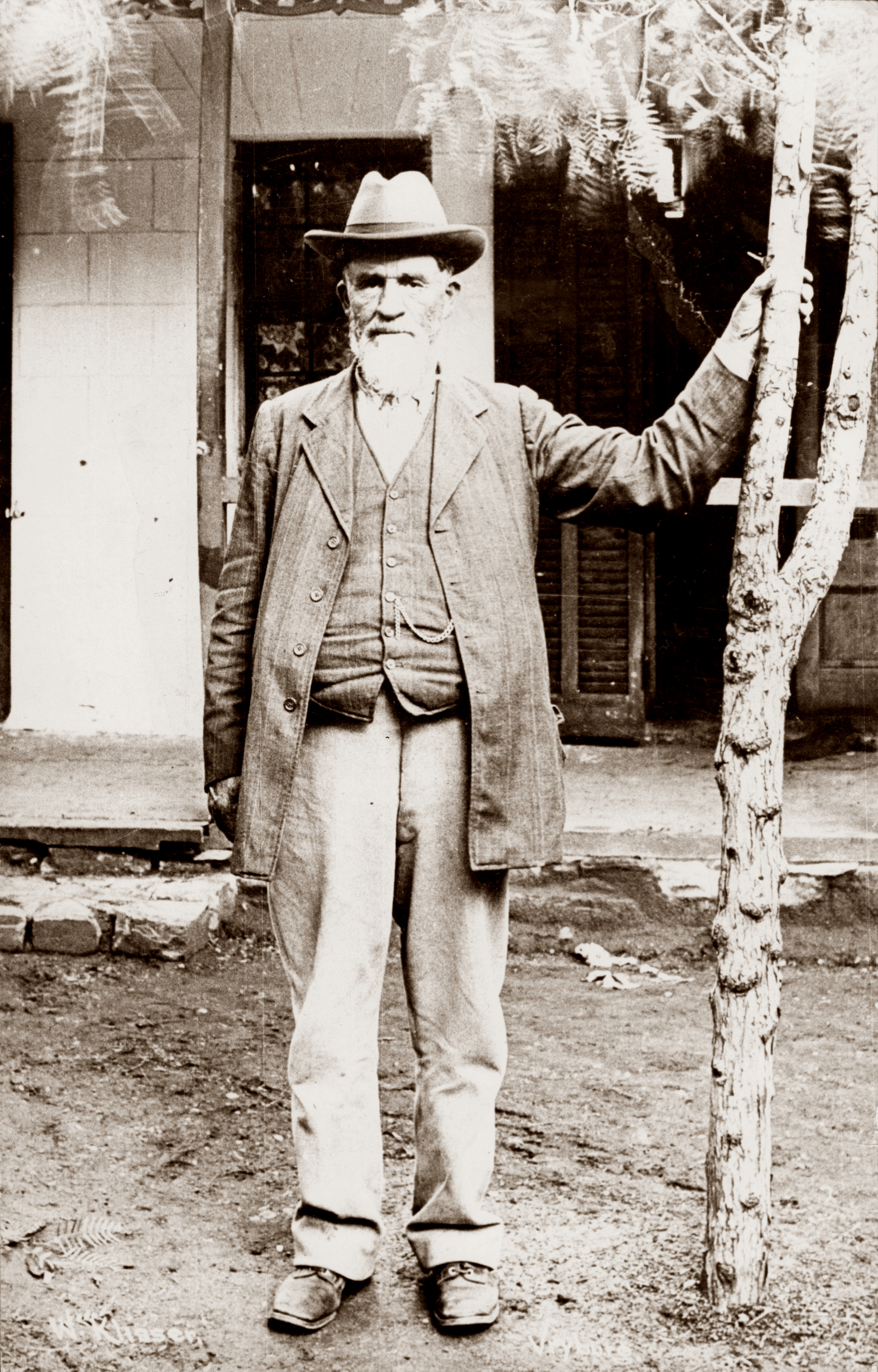
Boer general Christiaan de Wet after his surrender in the Boer Rebellion of 1914.

De Wet and his forces fled westward towards the Kalahari Desert in order to escape to German West Africa and evade imprisonment by British authorities. Botha's forces pursued De Wet relentlessly until De Wet was eventually captured near Vryburg on the way to Kuruman by fellow Afrikaner Colonel Coen Brits's motorized column on December 1, 1914. General Kemp crossed the Kalahari but surrendered in January 1915, meanwhile Manie Maritz escaped to Portuguese Angola. De Wet was convicted for armed insurrection and sentenced to six years in prison but only served one year before being granted an amnesty with the promise that he would no longer partake in South African politics.

== Notable participants ==
Several notable people took part in the battle including a young Johannes Van Rensburg who had then been serving the Union Defence Force. Stein later founded the Ossewabrandwag (OB), an Afrikaner nationalist organization.

Deneys Reitz, the soldier, adventurer and lawyer, fought on the side of the Union, as recounted in Trekking On (1933).
