= Siener van Rensburg =

South African prophet

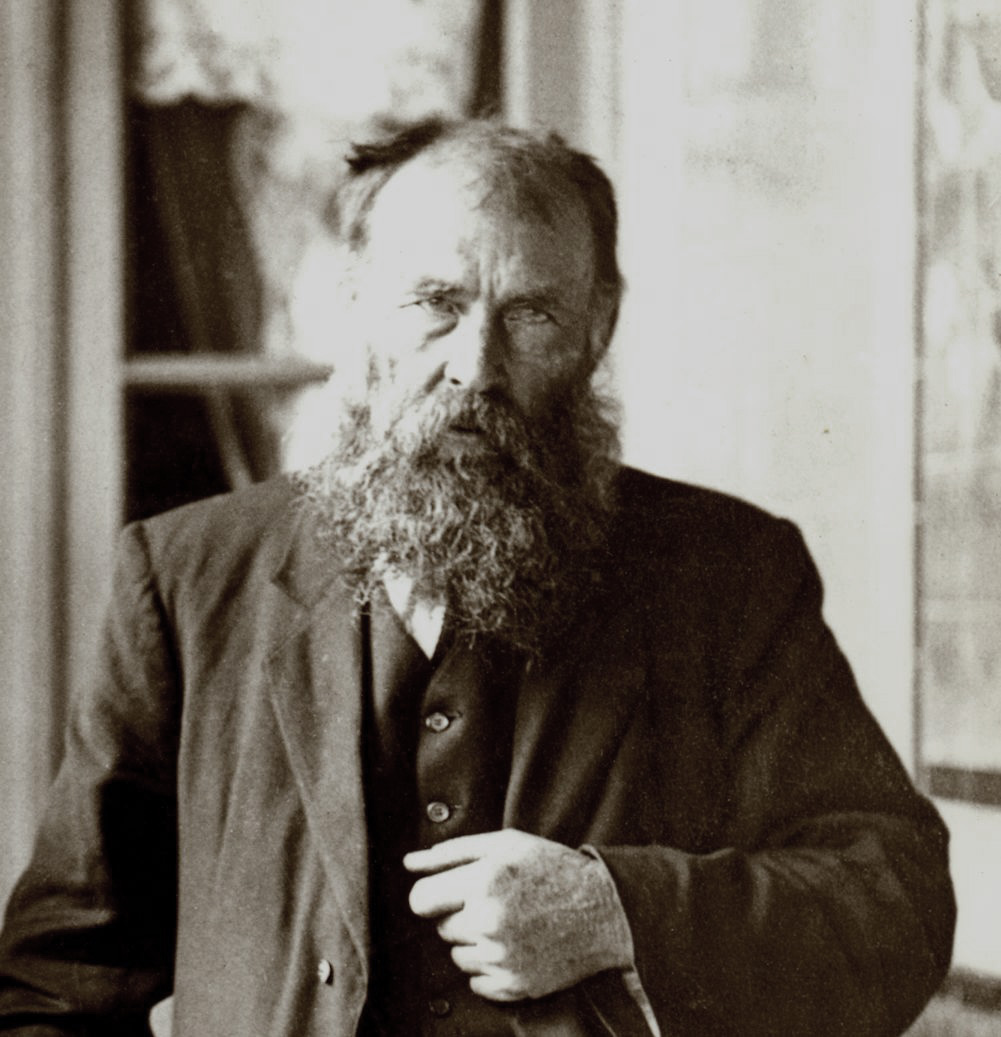
- Born: Nicolaas Pieter Johannes Janse van Rensburg; 3 August 1864; Palmietfontein farm, Potchefstroom, South African Republic
- Died: 11 March 1926 (aged 61); Rietkuil farm, Ottosdal
- Resting place: Van Rensburg cemetery, near Ottosdal, North West Province
- Known for: Prophet
- Spouse: Anna Sophia Kruger
- Children: (10) Willem Jacobus, Anna Sophia (Badenhorst), Anna Catharina, Maria Elizabeth
- Parent(s): Willem Jacobus Janse van Rensburg and Anna Catharina Janse van Rensburg

Nicolaas Pieter Johannes ("Niklaas" or "Siener") Janse van Rensburg (3 August 1864 – 11 March 1926) was a Boer from the South African Republic – also known as the Transvaal Republic – and later a citizen of South Africa who was considered by some to be a prophet of the Boers. Consequently, his nickname became "Siener" (Afrikaans for "seer"). Van Rensburg's visions were typically wrapped in a patriotic, religious format, and have been interpreted by believers as predictions of future events. During the Boer War he became a trusted companion, if not advisor to General de la Rey and President Steyn. The extent of his influence with these figures is disputed, though the devoutly religious de la Rey seemed to have considered him a prophet of God.

== Early life ==
Van Rensburg was born on the farm Palmietfontein in the Potchefstroom district, the son of Willem Jacobus Janse van Rensburg and Anna Catharina Janse van Rensburg. He only received 20 days of formal school training at the Rooipoort farm school, and spent much of his youth as a cattle herder. He could never write, but assisted by his mother, he learnt to read from the Bible. He never read anything else.

At age 16, he participated in a government expedition against the rebellious tribal leader Mabhogo. He contracted and survived malaria on the expedition and afterwards settled near Wolmaranstad in the then western ZAR. At age 21 he was an elected elder for the Hervormde Kerk, perhaps due to his scriptural knowledge. He married Anna Sophia Kruger in 1884.

== Boer war ==
Van Rensburg and his brother Pieter were commandeered to participate in the second Anglo-Boer War under General Sarel P. du Toit. Van Rensburg however remained unarmed and never fired a shot. His contribution was to be a stream of visions and prophesies for the duration of the war. As the seer would later explain, he believed that a nightly visitor woke him only a day before the outbreak of the war, with a message that his work was dedicated to God.

Following this vision, van Rensburg was beset with a fear that would not dissipate. When this disturbed state continued into their sojourn in Kimberley, his superiors sent him home. Experiencing no relief, he returned to the Siege of Kimberley, where he believed a new vision had revealed to him the defeat and loss of life that the war would bring about. Shortly afterwards, possibly at Graspan, his disturbed state lifted permanently as a soldier was wounded on his side, as, according to van Rensburg, another vision had forewarned. Van Rensburg then travelled with general Piet Cronjé but escaped the encirclement by British forces at Paardeberg. Subsequently, he travelled with different commandos, where a number of apparently accurate predictions established his reputation.

A report of his visions attracted the attention of General de la Rey, who recruited Van Rensburg for his commando. On 7 December 1900, General de Wet found himself cornered against the Caledon River, which was in flood, while British forces were assailing his position. When his surrender appeared imminent, a message from De la Rey was delivered by a Boer scout. Van Rensburg had allegedly foreseen the situation and the message outlined an escape route, which was duly followed, leaving the pursuers to flounder in the torrent which De Wet had just traversed. De la Rey, also hard pressed by his enemy, dispatched Van Rensburg to accompany President Steyn to Roodewal, De Wet's safe retreat in the northern Free State. Here Van Rensburg advised them to wait upon two horsemen which he described, who arrived the next day with a message from acting President Schalk Burger.

On 13 September 1901, van Rensburg found himself in the camp of Commandant Roux at Rietkuil near Vredefort. Sensing imminent danger, he advised those present, who had just retired for the day, to depart from the camp at once. Roux was slow to take heed, and his men even more so, as scouts had not observed enemy units. Van Rensburg, his wife and children escaped on a cart, shortly before the greater part of the camp was captured in a surprise attack.

=== Flight from the enemy ===
In January 1901 Van Rensburg had a vision indicating the flight of three Boer women, who were soon found and rescued by his host Willem Bosman. Days after rejoining De la Rey's commando he had visions of members of his own family being captured, and asked for leave to assist them. The Van Rensburg family fled from their farmhouse as British forces approached, but the wagon train carrying the elderly, women and neighbours was surprised and captured by traitors the following morning. Van Rensburg's parents, eldest daughter Hester and four younger children were subsequently interned at the Mafeking concentration camp.

Van Rensburg, his wife, eldest son Willem and two daughters travelled with a group which managed to evade their pursuers, and Van Rensburg once again joined De la Rey's commando. Upon meeting his wife again in mid October 1901, they found their farmhouse destroyed. Van Rensburg's ominous premonition concerning their daughters, Anna and Maria, was confirmed when news arrived that they and two relatives had died during an outbreak of measles in the concentration camp.

=== Closing stage of war ===
Van Rensburg was present when Commandant Van Aardt's company returned from the action at Yzerspruit on 25 February 1902. Van Aardt was in a despondent state as his brother was missing in action. Van Rensburg however assured him that his brother was neither dead nor captured, but alive, though in great pain. The wounded soldier was returned to camp the same evening, carried on the horse of a burgher who found him.

Before the Battle of Tweebosch, Van Rensburg gave a number of predictions indicating how the enemy would approach along the Harts River, and when he deemed them most vulnerable. He also envisaged how the victory would enhance De la Rey's reputation. Methuen's force collapsed in the face of De la Rey's sudden attack on 7 March 1902, and Methuen was captured.

On 17 March 1902, President Steyn, in the company of De Wet and Hertzog, arrived at Zendelingsfontein, De la Rey's headquarters near Klerksdorp, to consult De la Rey's physician about an eye ailment. Van Rensburg was once again dispatched to guard the president. Around the 23rd he had a vision of English troops arriving, but the president was unwilling to heed his warning, until De la Rey intervened urgently on Van Rensburg's behalf. The president departed for the safety of the Molopo River on the evening of the 24th. British troops arrived at Zendelingsfontein during the early hours of the 25th and captured two of De la Rey's adjutants.

Gaining entry to General Kemp's war council in the bushveld region, he soon warned them against attacking a retreating enemy, which would leave them vulnerable to encirclement. At the subsequent Battle of Hart's River on 31 March 1902, some British units did fall back, though some Canadians stood their ground until overpowered by burgher forces. Kemp, though partially or grudgingly heeding the seer's visions, was generally reluctant to give him credit.

== World War I rebellion ==
When the Union of South Africa came out in support of the Allied Powers in World War I, Van Rensburg allied with the rebels. The rebellion received a fatal blow even before it started, when the influential general Koos de la Rey was killed at a police road block on 15 September 1914.

De la Rey, when killed, was en route to General J. G. C. Kemp, who subsequently organised the rebellion in western Transvaal. On 2 November, Kemp addressed a public meeting at Vleeskraal, near Schweizer-Reneke, with the locally influential Van Rensburg at his side. Van Rensburg also addressed the assembly, and assured them that his visions indicated they had little to fear. 610 men then joined the rebel cause, and with conscription imminent, the number of rebel volunteers grew to 1,800.

General Kemp decided on a company of 720 men, mostly farmers, which included Van Rensburg and his son. They departed immediately on a journey to join Manie Maritz in German South-West Africa. After a desert trek and much hardship they linked up with Maritz's company on 29 November. Rebels under De Wet and Beyers were rounded up by South African forces in the days that followed.

Returning to South Africa, Maritz and Kemp engaged government forces at Nous, Lutzputs and finally at Upington, on 3 February 1915. Van Rensburg's son Willem was mortally wounded in the Upington clash, and the whole rebel force captured, with the exception of Maritz who fled via German South-West Africa to Angola, and thence to Portugal. Van Rensburg, like his comrades, received a prison sentence. He however served about a year, first in Boksburg, then in the Old Fort, Johannesburg.

== Post-war years ==
After his release Nicolaas van Rensburg returned to his farm Rietkuil, near Wolmaranstad. Some of his visions were then recorded by reverend Dr Rossouw. Van Rensburg's daughter Anna Badenhorst also recorded a set of visions up to his death at age 61. The latter set is considered to be difficult to interpret and not very coherent.

With the outbreak of World War II, the collections of visions were considered inflammatory. Distribution was prohibited and some copies seized on orders of prime minister Jan Smuts. Upon Anna's death her handwritten documents were transferred to Lichtenburg museum's archives, where they were rediscovered in 1991. The farm and van Rensburg family cemetery are located 11 km (just under 7 miles) from Ottosdal, in the North West Province.

== Visions ==
His mother commented on his visual hallucinations as a toddler, and said that these seemed to disturb him. General Hertzog described him as someone continuously distracted by a maze of imagery and symbolism. 700 visions have been documented.

Van Rensburg interpreted his hallucinations as visions that were usually connected to the welfare of the Boere, the Netherlands and Germany. For example, a vision of the sisal plant was interpreted as a portent of an important meeting, assembly or parliament. Van Rensburg's visions have been described by some as predictions of local events, such as the death of general Koos de la Rey and the political transition of South Africa. Van Rensburg and his followers have also interpreted his visions as being connected to international events, such as the start of World War I and the rise of Communism. He did not interpret all of his visions, and some have been posthumously applied to more recent events as prophecies.

== Reitz's assessment ==
Boer soldier Deneys Reitz's account of the Boer War contains a colourful objective account of one of the seer's predictions (shortened):

... a prophet, a strange character, with long flowing beard and wild fanatical eyes, who dreamed dreams and pretended to possess occult powers. I personally witnessed one of the lucky hits while we were congregated around the General's cart. Van Rensburg was expounding his latest vision to a hushed audience. It ran of a black bull and a red bull fighting, until at length the red bull sank defeated to its knees, referring to the British. Arms outstretched and eyes ablaze, he suddenly called out: See, who comes?; and, looking up, we made out a distant horseman spurring towards us. When he came up, he produced a letter from General Botha, hundreds of miles away.

General de la Rey opened it and said: "Men, believe me, the proud enemy is humbled". The letter contained news that the English had proposed a peace conference. "Coming immediately upon the prophecy, it was a dramatic moment and I was impressed, even though I suspected that van Rensburg had stage-managed the scene. Of the general's sincerity there could be no doubt as he firmly believed in the seer's predictions."

== Contemporary relevance ==
The Suidlanders, an ethnonationalist Afrikaner survivalist group, are heavily influenced by the prophecies of Van Rensburg.
