= Ferdinandus Jacobus Potgieter =

Boer War general

General Ferdinandus Jacobus Potgieter (1857-1902)
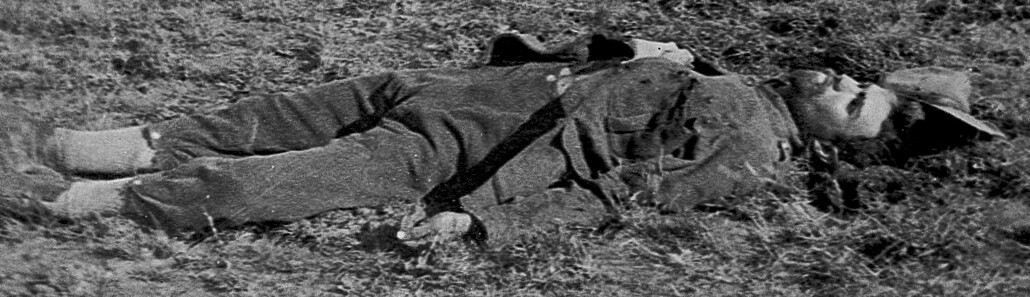

Personal details
- Born: 16 February 1857 Farm Honingkrans, Winburg, Orange Free State, (South Africa)
- Died: 11 April 1902 (aged 45) Rooiwal near Klerksdorp, South African Republic, (South Africa )
- Parent(s): Petrus Philippus Potgieter (1820 – 1901) and Christina Elizabeth Ferreira (1826 – 1880)
- Occupation: commander, combat general (Afrikaans: veggeneraal) Wolmaransstad Commando

Military service
- Allegiance: South African Republic
- Battles/wars: many battles in the Second Boer War (1899-1902) including: Battle of Magersfontein; Siege of Kimberley; Battle of Paardeberg; Battle of Rooiwal †

Ferdinandus Jacobus Potgieter (Ferdinand Jacobus Potgieter; 16 February 1857 – 11 April 1902) was a Boer general in the Second Boer War (1899–1902).

== Family ==
Potgieter was born the fourth child and fourth son of farmer Petrus Philippus Potgieter (Uitenhage, Eastern Cape, South Africa, 14 December 1820 – British concentration camp Klerksdorp, 20 December 1901) and Wilhelmina Jacoba Pieterse (Cradock, Eastern Cape, 25 August 1826 – Farm Matjiesspruit, Makwassie, now North West province, 18 August 1880), among six sons and three daughters.

Young Potgieter married Jacoba Johanna Magdalena Pieterse (Potchefstroom District, 15 May 1860 Boksburg, 16 November 1926) and had one son and seven daughters by her, born in Makwassie, Potchefstroom and Wolmaransstad. One daughter, Johanna Margaretha Elisabeth (1879 – 24 May 1902), died in British concentration camp Merebank near Durban.

== Second Boer War ==
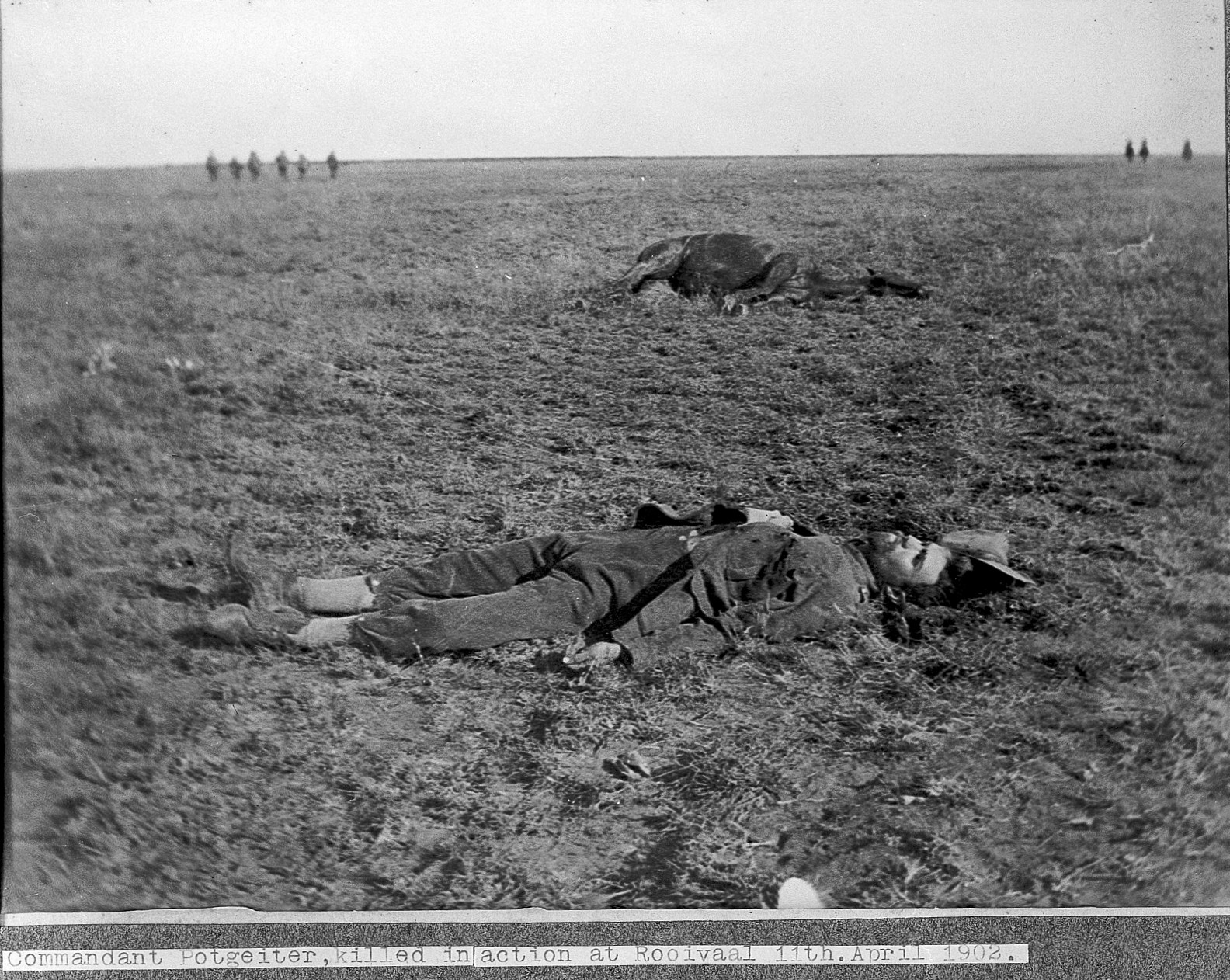
After the Battle of Rooiwal (11 April 1902) General Ferdinandus Jacobus Potgieter was found killed in the grass 27 metres from the British line. With 50 of his horsemen he had charged the British trying in vain to escape encirclement.

In the Second Boer War Potgieter commanded the Wolmaransstad Commando for the South African Republic and fought in many actions such as Battle of Magersfontein (11 December 1899) and the Siege of Kimberley on 11 November 1899, ultimately being promoted to the rank of a fighting general (veggeneraal). With 20 of his men he and general Froneman serving general Piet Cronjé timely escaped the British encirclement at the Battle of Paardeberg (18 – 27 February 1900) and reached the troops of general Christiaan de Wet. Later, after the capture of the Orange Free State capital of Bloemfontein on 13 March 1900) he opposed the march of general French to Pretoria on 3 June 1900.

After the capture of the capital of Pretoria by Lord Roberts on 5 June 1900, Potgieter continued the war under general Koos de la Rey as a 'bittereinder' (Afrikaans for fighter to the bitter end, diehard). While De la Rey was away attending peace ouvertures at Vereeniging, Potgieter and Boer general Jan Kemp performed an audacious but failed charge without cover against a British line to again escape encirclement, this time in the Battle of Rooiwal (11 April 1902) in the Lichtenburg district near Klerksdorp. Historian Thomas Pakenham wrote:

The Boers, led by Generals Kemp and Potgieter, galloped on towards destruction, as though possessed by the spirit of Lord Lucan and the Light Brigade...The six British guns began to tear holes in the column. Still they came on, gambling everything on the chance that the British would turn and run... [Later:] A mile away, Potgieter lay sprawled thirty yards from the South African Constabulary line, conspicuous with his neatly trimmed beard and blue shirt, and there were three bullets in his head and body. Beside his corpse lay fifty other dead Boers.

— Pakenham 1992

This turned out to be the final battle of the war. The peace Treaty of Vereeniging was signed in Pretoria on 31 May 1902.

== Literature ==
- Breytenbach, J. H. Die Geskiedenis van die Tweede Vryheidsoorlog in Suid-Afrika, 1899–1902 [The History of the Second Freedom War in South Africa, 1899-1902], Die Staatsdrukker Pretoria, 1969–1996. Six volumes in Afrikaans.
  - Breytenbach, J. H. (1969). Die Boere-offensief, Okt. – Nov. 1899 [The Boer Offensive, Oct. – Nov. 1899]. Die Geskiedenis van die Tweede Vryheidsoorlog in Suid-Afrika, 1899–1902 (in Afrikaans). Vol. I. Pretoria: Die Staatsdrukker. OCLC 798106662.
  - Breytenbach, J. H. (1971). Die eerste Britse offensief, Nov. - Des. 1899 [The first British offensive, Nov. - Dec. 1899]. Die Geskiedenis van die Tweede Vryheidsoorlog in Suid-Afrika, 1899-1902 (in Afrikaans). Vol. II. Pretoria: Die Staatsdrukker. Pages 116 and 378.
  - Breytenbach, J. H. (1977). Die Boereterugtog uit Kaapland [The Boer retreat from the Cape Colony]. Die Geskiedenis van die Tweede Vryheidsoorlog in Suid-Afrika, 1899-1902 (in Afrikaans). Vol. IV. Pretoria: Die Staatsdrukker.
  - Breytenbach, J. H. (1983). Die Britse Opmars tot in Pretoria [The British advance to Pretoria]. Die Geskiedenis van die Tweede Vryheidsoorlog in Suid-Afrika, 1899-1902 (in Afrikaans). Vol. V. Pretoria: Die Staatsdrukker. ISBN 9780621083606. OCLC 769254652. Pages 327, 344–346, 357 and 544.
  - Breytenbach, J. H. (1996). Die beleg van Mafeking tot met die Slag van Bergendal [The siege of Mafeking up to the Battle of Bergendal]. Die Geskiedenis van die Tweede Vryheidsoorlog in Suid-Afrika, 1899–1902 (in Afrikaans). Vol. VI. Pretoria: Die Staatsdrukker. ISBN 9780797033214. OCLC 813492747. Page 52: general Potgieter on the western front.
- Pakenham, Thomas, The Boer War, George Weidenfeld & Nicolson, London, 1979. Abacus, 1992. ISBN 0 349 10466 2. Pages 558–559.
