= R. A. P. Clements =

British Army general

Major-General R. A. P. Clements CB DSO
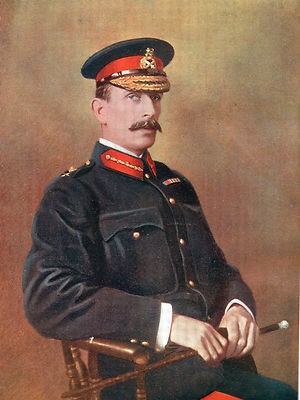
- Born: 9 February 1855; Upton St Leonards, Stroud District, Gloucestershire, England
- Died: 2 April 1909 (aged 54) Quetta, British India
- Allegiance: United Kingdom
- Branch: British Army
- Service years: 1874–1909
- Rank: Major-General
- Commands: 2nd Battalion, South Wales Borderers; 12th Brigade; Agra Second Class Command (later Sirhind Brigade); 4th (Quetta) Division
- Conflicts: Xhosa War of 1877–1878; Anglo-Zulu War; Third Anglo-Burmese War; Second Boer War
- Awards: Companion of the Order of the Bath; Distinguished Service Order; Mentioned in Dispatches

Major-General Ralph Arthur Penrhyn Clements, CB, DSO (9 February 1855 – 2 April 1909) was a senior British Army officer.

Clements, the son of a churchman, fought in the Xhosa War of 1877–1878 and the Anglo-Zulu War as a junior officer. He was twice wounded during the Third Anglo-Burmese War while serving as a brigade major, being mentioned in dispatches. After commanding a battalion of the South Wales Borderers during the late 1890s, he was appointed a brigade commander during the Second Boer War. Clements commanded the Colesberg front in early 1900, but was surprised at the Battle of Nooitgedacht in December, managing to extricate his force from the latter. After the Boer War he served in India, rising to divisional command before his death.

== Early life and career ==
Clements was born at Upton St Leonards on 9 February 1855, the son of Reverend Jacob Clements, a local sub-dean and Canon Residentiary, and was educated at the Rossall School. He transferred from the Royal North Lincoln Militia to the 24th Regiment of Foot in the Regular Army on 2 December 1874, and served as a lieutenant in South Africa. Clements fought at the Battle of Nyumaga during the Xhosa War of 1877–1878, being mentioned in dispatches on 26 February 1878. He became adjutant of his battalion on 27 July 1879 and served at the Battle of Ulundi during the 1879 Anglo-Zulu War. For his service, Clements received the South Africa Medal with clasp; he continued to serve with the regiment when it became the South Wales Borderers and was promoted to captain on 4 December 1880, becoming a company commander.

Clements became battalion adjutant again on 26 October 1882, holding the position until promoted to major on 24 February 1886. He served as a brigade major during the Burma Expedition and as Assistant Provost Marshal, being twice wounded in battle (once severely) and mentioned in dispatches on 22 June 1886. Clements rejoined his battalion in early 1886 and remained with them until 1889. Clements received the India General Service Medal with clasps and was brevetted lieutenant colonel in July 1887 for his actions. Awarded the Distinguished Service Order in 1891, he was made an Aide-de-camp to Queen Victoria on 2 December 1896. On 8 April 1897 Clements was promoted to command of the 2nd Battalion, South Wales Borderers.

== Second Boer War ==
During the Second Boer War, on 20 November 1899 Clements was selected to take command of the unit that became the 12th Brigade of the 6th Division at Aldershot. He departed for South Africa on 4 December with the temporary rank of major general and the substantive rank of colonel. Clements took over command on the Colesberg front from Major General John French in late January and held it with lesser forces against the attacks of Boer commander Koos de la Rey. On 12 February, after the action at Pink Hill, Clements shortened his line in the face of the Boer advance by retreating to Rensburg siding. After the victories of Field Marshal Frederick Roberts on the western front, the Boers retreated and Clements took Colesberg on 28 February. He was in command of forces occupying the South-Western part of the Orange Free State in March 1900, including Fauresmith, the second largest city.

He led his brigade (column) under the command of Archibald Hunter during the advance into the Brandwater Basin during July 1900. Due to the slow movement of his supply convoy, the advance of the column into the Drakensberg was delayed until 20 July. For the attack of Hunter's force, Clements and Arthur Paget's columns were tasked with attacking Slabbert's Nek in the Boer centre. Slebbert's Nek was taken with little resistance and the columns joined Hunter and advanced to Fouriesburg, after which a large Boer force under General Marthinus Prinsloo surrendered to them.

Clements' column moved into the Magalies valley in September and remained there for the next three months, burning farms there so effectively that the area became a "blackened desert" according to the historian Thomas Pakenham. Clements encamped at Nooitgedacht on 8 December, in a position that provided him with a water supply and heliograph communication, though dominated by the Magaliesberg. His 1,200-strong force was attacked at dawn on 13 December by more than 1,500 Boers under de la Rey and Christian Frederick Beyers. The three hundred dispersed pickets he had posted on the ridge were swiftly overrun and surrendered. After Boer fire was directed on his camp, Clements began a retreat with the remaining half of his force to Yeomanry Hill in the valley, out of range of the Boers on the ridge. Due to Boer exhaustion and looting of his camp, Clements managed an orderly retreat towards Pretoria that afternoon. Clements subsequently commanded the districts of Pretoria and Standerton-Heidelberg. He was mentioned in dispatches on 4 May 1900, 16 April 1901, and 29 July 1902, and received the Queen's medal with three clasps and the King's medal with two clasps. Following the end of the war in June 1902, he held a staff appointment at Cape Town for several months, then arrived home on the SS Saxon in late December 1902.

== Later life ==
He was made an aide-de-camp to Edward VII in 1901 and a Companion of the Order of the Bath in 1904. On 1 February of that year, he was sent to India as a major general in the British Indian Army to command a second class district at Agra, which became the Sirhind Brigade of the 3rd (Lahore) Division under the Kitchener Reforms. Clements was appointed commander of the 4th (Quetta) Division on 1 December 1907, and died on 2 April 1909 at Quetta from complications resulting from an appendicitis operation. He was buried in the New Cemetery at Quetta.

Military offices
| Preceded by Horace Smith-Dorrien | General Officer Commanding the 4th (Quetta) Division; 1907–1909 | Succeeded by Henry Sclater |
