= Bittereinder =

Boer guerilla faction (1900–1902)

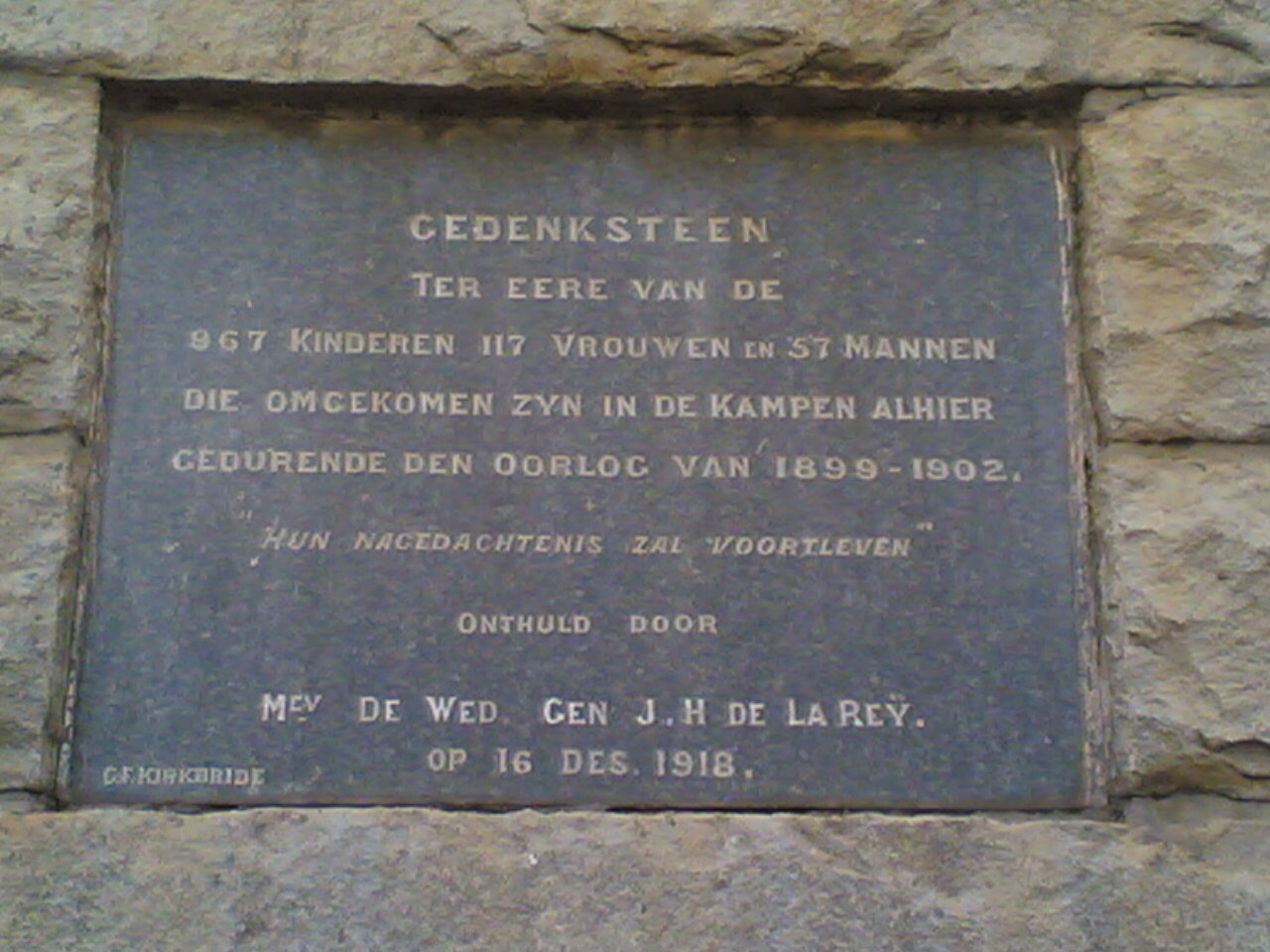
Plaque on the Potchefstroom Concentration Camp Memorial. Translated text: Memorial stone / In honor of the / 967 children 117 women and 57 men / who died in the camps here / during the war of 1899-1902. / "Their memory will live on" / Revealed by / Mrs. the widow. Gen J. H de la Rey. / On 16 Dec. 1918. / C.F. Kirkbride

The Bittereinders (Afrikaans: [ˌbətərˈəindərs]) or irreconcilables were a faction of Boer guerrilla fighters, resisting the forces of the British Empire in the later stages of the Second Boer War (1899–1902).

By September 1900, the conventional forces of the South African Republic and the Orange Free State had been largely defeated by the British army. The remnants of the Boer government resolved to fight on in a guerrilla war, to try to force the British to retreat from the territory. As it became clear that military victory was unlikely, opinion among the guerrillas divided between those who wanted to secure a negotiated peace and those who preferred to fight on to "the bitter end" (Afrikaans: bitter eind). The decision to continue the fight was given particular motivation by the British use of concentration camps to intern captured Boers.

Taken more generally, it could be used as another name for a "war party" (a faction within a political or military group favouring the waging of war) or for any group which does not wish to diminish its "fighting spirit", wanting to fight it out to the "bitter end".

== See also ==
- Deneys Reitz — chose exile (in Madagascar) at the war's end rather than sign an undertaking that he would abide by the peace terms.
- Ferdinandus Jacobus Potgieter — continued to fight and was shot in the Battle of Rooiwal, 11 April 1902.
- Maritz rebellion (1914) — took place at the start of World War I by some Boers who were not prepared to see South Africa side with the British against the Germans (who had aided the Boer Republics during the Boer War).
