= Deneys Reitz =

South African politician (1882–1944)

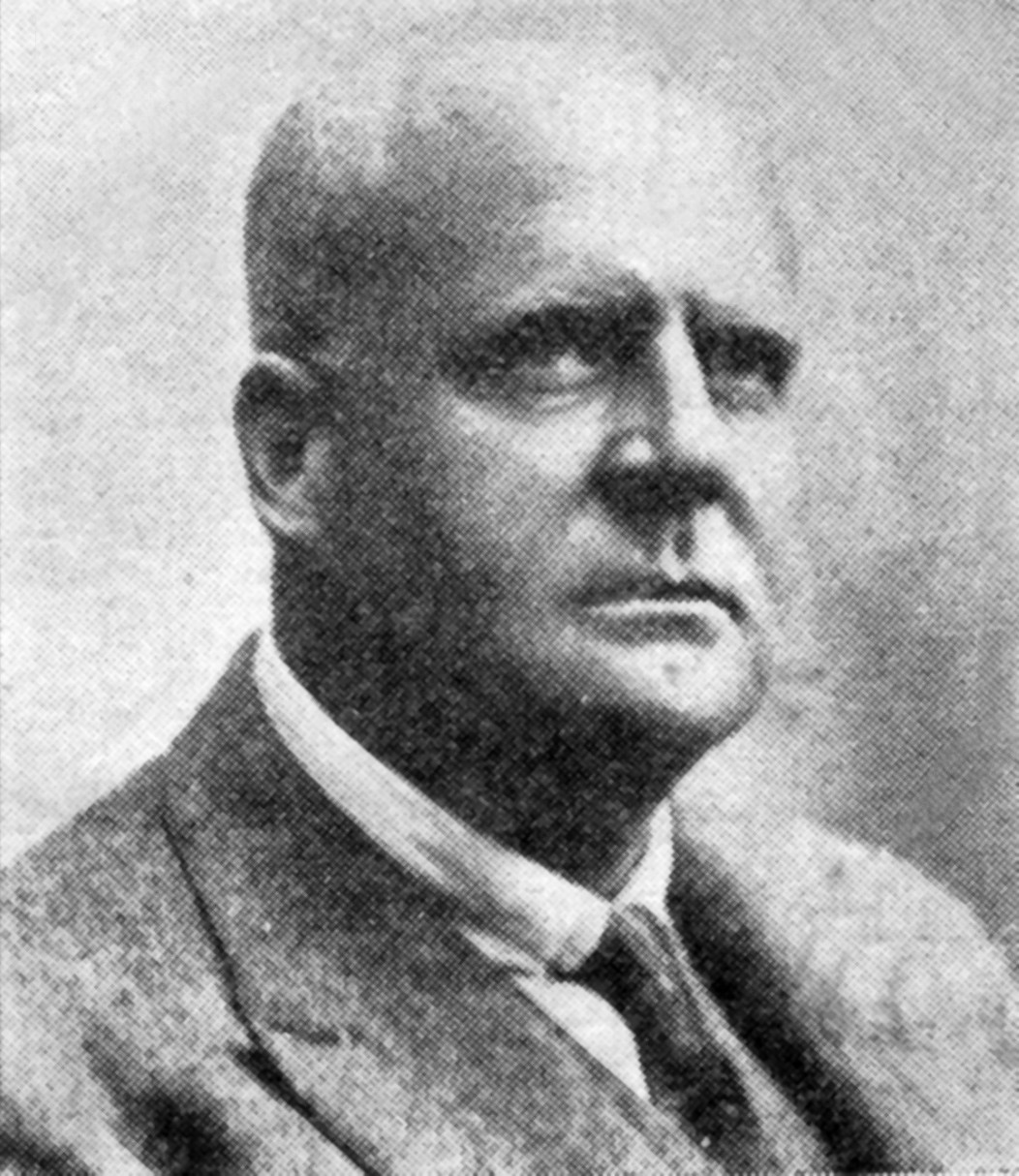

Deputy Prime Minister of South Africa
- In office 5 September 1939 – 23 December 1942
- Monarch: George VI
- Prime Minister: Jan Smuts
- Preceded by: Jan Smuts
- Succeeded by: Jan Hofmeyr

South African High Commissioner to the United Kingdom
- In office 1942 – 19 October 1944
- Preceded by: Sidney Frank Waterson
- Succeeded by: George Heaton Nicholls
Ministerial offices 1933‍–‍1942
Minister of Native Affairs
In office 5 September 1939 – 23 December 1942
Prime Minister	Jan Smuts
Preceded by	Henry Allan Fagan
Succeeded by	Pieter Voltelyn Graham van der Byl
Minister of Mines
In office 1938 – 5 September 1939
Prime Minister	J. B. M. Hertzog
Preceded by	Adriaan Paulus Johannes Fourie
Succeeded by	Charles Stallard
Minister of Agriculture and Forestry
In office 1935 – 18 May 1938
Prime Minister	J. B. M. Hertzog
Preceded by	Jan Kemp
Succeeded by	William Richard Collins
Minister of Lands
In office 1933–1935
Prime Minister	J. B. M. Hertzog
Preceded by	Piet Grobler
Succeeded by	Jan Kemp
Ministerial offices 1921‍–‍1924
Minister of Lands and Irrigation
In office 1921–1924
Prime Minister	Jan Smuts
Preceded by	Hendrik Mentz
Succeeded by	Piet Grobler

Member of Parliament
- Constituency: Barberton (1929–1943); Port Elizabeth Central (1921–1929); Bloemfontein South (1920-1921)

Personal details
- Born: 2 April 1882 Bloemfontein, Orange Free State (now Free State, South Africa)
- Died: 19 October 1944 (aged 62) Charing Cross Hospital, London, England
- Resting place: Magale, Mariepskop; 24°33′56″S 30°53′37″E
- Citizenship: South Africa
- Party: South African Party (1920-1933)
- Other political affiliations: United Party (1933–1942)
- Spouse: Leila Agnes Buissiné Wright (m. 1920)
- Children: 1. Jan Deneys Reitz (1920–2003); 2. Claude Michael Deneys Reitz (1923–1952)
- Parents: Francis William Reitz; Blanka Thesen
- Education: Grey College, Bloemfontein
- Occupation: Attorney; Author; Cabinet Minister; Soldier and Military Officer
- Known for: Author of Commando (1929); Trustee of the Kruger National Park

Military service
- Branch/service: Boer commandos; British Army
- Years of service: 1898–1902, 1914-1919
- Rank: Colonel
- Unit: Pretoria Commando; South African Horse; Royal Irish Rifles; King's Shropshire Light Infantry; Royal Scots Fusiliers
- Commands: 4th South African Horse; 1st bn, Royal Scots Fusiliers
- Battles/wars: Second Boer War; Maritz rebellion; First World War

Deneys Reitz (3 April 1882 – 19 October 1944), was a South African soldier, author, adventurer and statesman. Best known as the author of Commando (1929), which detailed his experience in the Second Boer War, he also fought against the Maritz rebellion, and in the First World War in Africa and Europe. In the 1920s he began a decades-long political career which included multiple ministerial portfolios, culminating in the office of Deputy Prime Minister under Jan Smuts. A lawyer by trade, his eponymous firm Deneys Reitz Inc went on to become one of South Africa's leading firms. Reitz died in office in 1944 as South African High Commissioner to the United Kingdom.

The son of Orange Free State President Francis William Reitz, Reitz fought as a Boer commando for the duration of the Second Boer War, including as a Bittereinder under General Jan Smuts in the Cape Colony. After the war, he refused to sign an oath of allegiance to Britain, and followed his father into exile. After a difficult period in French Madagascar, Reitz returned to South Africa at the urging of Smuts, settling in Heilbron as a lawyer. Under Smuts' tutelage he accepted the new Union of South Africa and reconciled himself to its membership of the British Empire. At the start of the First World War, he took up arms to lead local pro-government forces in the suppression of the Maritz rebellion. Reitz then served with the South African Army in the South West Africa and East African campaigns, before joining the British Army in order to fight on the Western Front. Wounded twice in the trenches, he was mentioned in dispatches and finished the war in command of the 1st Royal Scots Fusiliers.

On returning to South Africa he commenced a political career, holding various portfolios in both the South African Party Government of 1921-1924 and in the United Party Government from 1933-1942. As Minister for Lands he helped lay the groundwork for establishing the Kruger National Park, and later served as one of its first Trustees. Outside of politics, he published Commando (1929), Trekking On (1933) and No Outspan (1943), and undertook expeditions to the Kalahari, Kaokoveld, the Belgian Congo and Angola. His political career culminated in serving as Deputy Prime Minister under Smuts, in which capacity he represented South Africa at the Dominions war conference of 1939. Reitz was appointed South African High Commissioner to the United Kingdom in 1942, and would die in office in 1944 in London.

== Early life and education ==
Deneys Reitz was born in 1882 in Bloemfontein to Francis William Reitz, and Blanka Thesen (1854–1887), as the middle child of five sons. His father came from a Cape Dutch family who had seen in South Africa since 1791, while his mother was Norwegian. Reitz spoke both Afrikaans and English at home, and also learnt Dutch, English, French and German. Reitz described his childhood as:

[...] a Tom-Saywerlike existence such as falls to the lot of few boys nowadays. We learned to ride, shoot, and swim almost as soon as we could walk, and there was a string of hard Basuto ponies in the stables, on which we were often away for weeks at a time, riding over the game-covered plains by day, and sleeping under the stars at night, hunting, fishing and camping to our heart's content, and clattering home again when we had had our fill.

Reitz Snr. became State President of the Orange Free State in 1885, and in this capacity toured Europe in 1894, which Reitz accompanied, meeting the Queen Wilhelmina of the Netherlands, the French President, King Leopold II and Sir George Grey. In the Free State, through his father Reitz also met key personalities of the time, including Paul Kruger, Piet Joubert and Cecil Rhodes, who Reitz remembered cracking jokes with him and his brothers.

In 1895 Reitz's father fell ill and the family left the Free State for the Cape Colony, living at Claremont. After recovering, his father he took office as the State Secretary of the South African Republic in 1898, moving Reitz back to Bloemfontein.

Reitz was educated at Wynberg Boys' High School in Cape Town and Grey College in Bloemfontein.

== Second Boer War ==
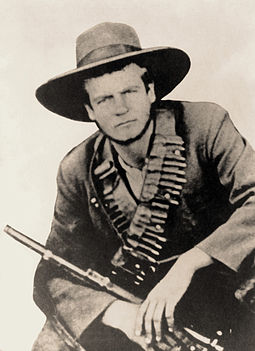
Deneys Reitz while acting as Kommando during the Second Boer War

At the age of 17, while visiting his father in Pretoria, at the start of the Second Boer War, the Field-Cornet's office said he was too young to fight and refused to enlist him. He met his father with the President of the Transvaal, Paul Kruger, who took him straight to the room of the Commandant-General Piet Joubert. Joubert personally handed him a new Mauser carbine and a bandolier of ammunition. He and one of his brothers then joined the Boer forces "by virtue of having thrown our belongings through a carriage window and climbing aboard".

During the initial phase of the War, he fought several battles, including the engagement at Surprise Hill (Vaalkop) at the Siege of Ladysmith and in the Boer victory at Spionkop. After a string of Boer defeats in set-piece warfare and the British capture of Pretoria, Reitz was one of the fighters who remained in the field, fighting under Christiaan Beyers at Nooitgedacht. At length he joined General Smuts who decided to conduct guerrilla operations, not in the territories of the Boer republics, but in the Cape Colony. They faced immense difficulties, both from British forces and from nature, and when the majority did break through to the Cape they were on their last legs.

=== Battle of Elands River ===
On 17 September 1901, Smuts' commando encountered the 17th Lancers in the vicinity of Tarkastad. Smuts realised that the Lancers' camp was their one opportunity to re-equip themselves with horses, food and clothing. A fierce fight, subsequently to be known as the Battle of Elands River, took place, with the Lancers being caught in a cross-fire and suffering heavy casualties. Stunned by the onslaught, the remaining Lancers put up a white flag. Reitz encountered Captain Sandeman, the Lancers' commander, and his lieutenant Lord Vivian among the wounded.

In his book Commando, Reitz recounts how Lord Vivian pointed out his bivouac tent and told him it would be worth his while to take a look at it. Soon, Reitz, who that morning had been wearing a grain-bag, riding a foundered horse, and carrying an old Gewehr 1888 rifle with only two rounds of ammunition left, was dressed in a cavalry tunic and riding breeches, with a superb mount, a Lee-Metford sporting rifle, and full bandoliers. Reitz reports that he met Lord Vivian again in London in 1935, on excellent terms, and again in 1939 whilst in Britain on an official trip as Deputy Prime Minister of South Africa.

Thomas Pakenham, in his introduction to the 1983 Jonathan Ball edition of Commando, reports a more elaborate story. In this touching account, Vivian overcomes Reitz's reluctance to take Vivian's possessions, and presents Reitz's original rifle to him in London in 1943. As Vivian died in 1940 this is impossible, although Pakenham may have simply got the year wrong, as Reitz did meet Lord Vivian again during his 1939 trip.

=== Siege of Okiep ===
At the end of the war, after remarkable adventures, Smuts' commando had made itself a relatively comfortable base in the west of the Cape Colony and was besieging the garrison of Okiep, Northern Cape.

== Defeat and exile ==
Reitz formed part of the negotiating delegation from his commando, given passage to meet the delegates from the other commandos still in the field. He reports that:

Nothing could have proved more clearly how nearly the Boer cause was spent than these starving, ragged men clad in skins or sacking, their bodies covered in sores, from lack of salt or food, and their appearance was a great shock to us, who came from the better-conditioned forces in the Cape.

Reitz's father was among the signatories of the surrender, but only in his official capacity; he refused to sign himself and was given two weeks to settle his affairs in Pretoria before leaving the country. Deneys felt that he had to stand by his father and so also refused to sign. He left for Madagascar with his brother Arend, where they eked out a living convoying goods by ox-transport "hard work in dank fever-stricken forests and across mountains sodden with eternal rain". In his spare time there he wrote Commando, dated 1903 but not published until 1929.

== Return to South Africa, active service, and public life ==
On the advice of his wartime commander, Jan Smuts, he returned to South Africa in 1906. The malaria he had contracted in Madagascar had so severely affected his health that he collapsed unconscious upon his return to South Africa. He was nursed back to health over three years by Jan Smuts' wife, Isie. He then completed his studies and in 1908 in Heilbron began his successful career as a lawyer. In 1914 he helped Smuts suppress the Maritz Rebellion in the Orange Free State, and he served on Smuts' army staff in the "German West campaign" (in the German colony of German South West Africa) and in the "German East campaign" (in German East Africa) where he rose to command a mounted regiment. On the Western Front during World War I he commanded the First Battalion, Royal Scots Fusiliers in 1918, after being wounded in late 1917 while serving with 6/7th Battalion Royal Scots Fusiliers. He led his men to the Rhine after the Armistice, as detailed in his book Trekking On.

He joined Smuts' South African Party, becoming the member of the House of Assembly of South Africa for Bloemfontein South, defeating Colin Steyn of the National Party by 101 votes in the first of their three contests for this seat. His principles during his political career included loyalty to General Smuts, loyalty to the British Empire as guarantor of South African freedom, and harmony between Dutch and English South Africans. He opposed the Ossewa Brandwag organisation, which planned to take control of South Africa as soon as Britain had been crushed.

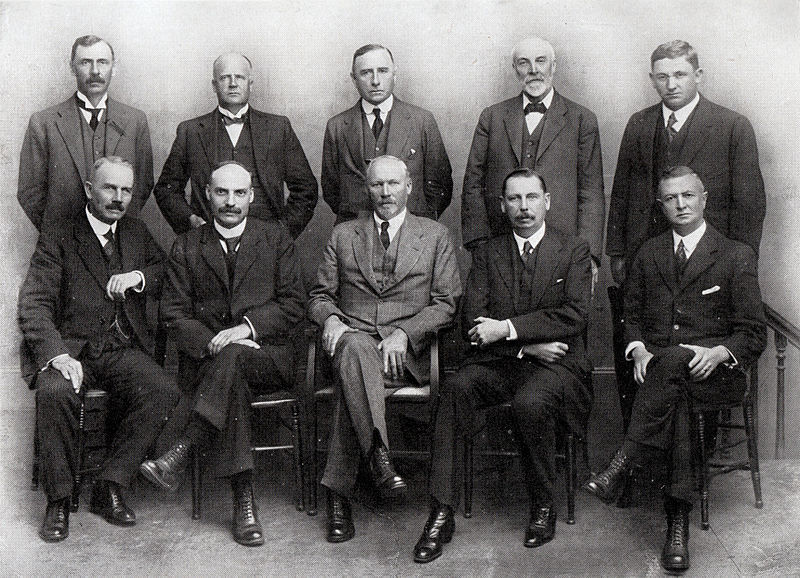
The Second Smuts Cabinet, c.1923. Deneys Reitz is second left in the back row.

In 1920 he married Leila Agnes Buissiné Wright (Cape Town, 13 December 1887 - Cape Town, 29 December 1959). She was a social reformer, an outspoken advocate of women's rights and suffrage for women, and the first woman member of the Assembly (representative for Parktown in Johannesburg, 1933–1944).

On 3 August 1920, Steyn again stood against him in the same constituency. Reitz won again, this time with a majority of 141. In the general election of 1921, Reitz and Steyn contested Bloemfontein South once more. This time Steyn was returned with a majority of 47.

When the Smuts government fell in 1924, Reitz returned to his law practice. In subsequent years he visited the Kalahari, Kaokoveld, the Belgian Congo and Angola. His last book, No Outspan (1943), describes this period.

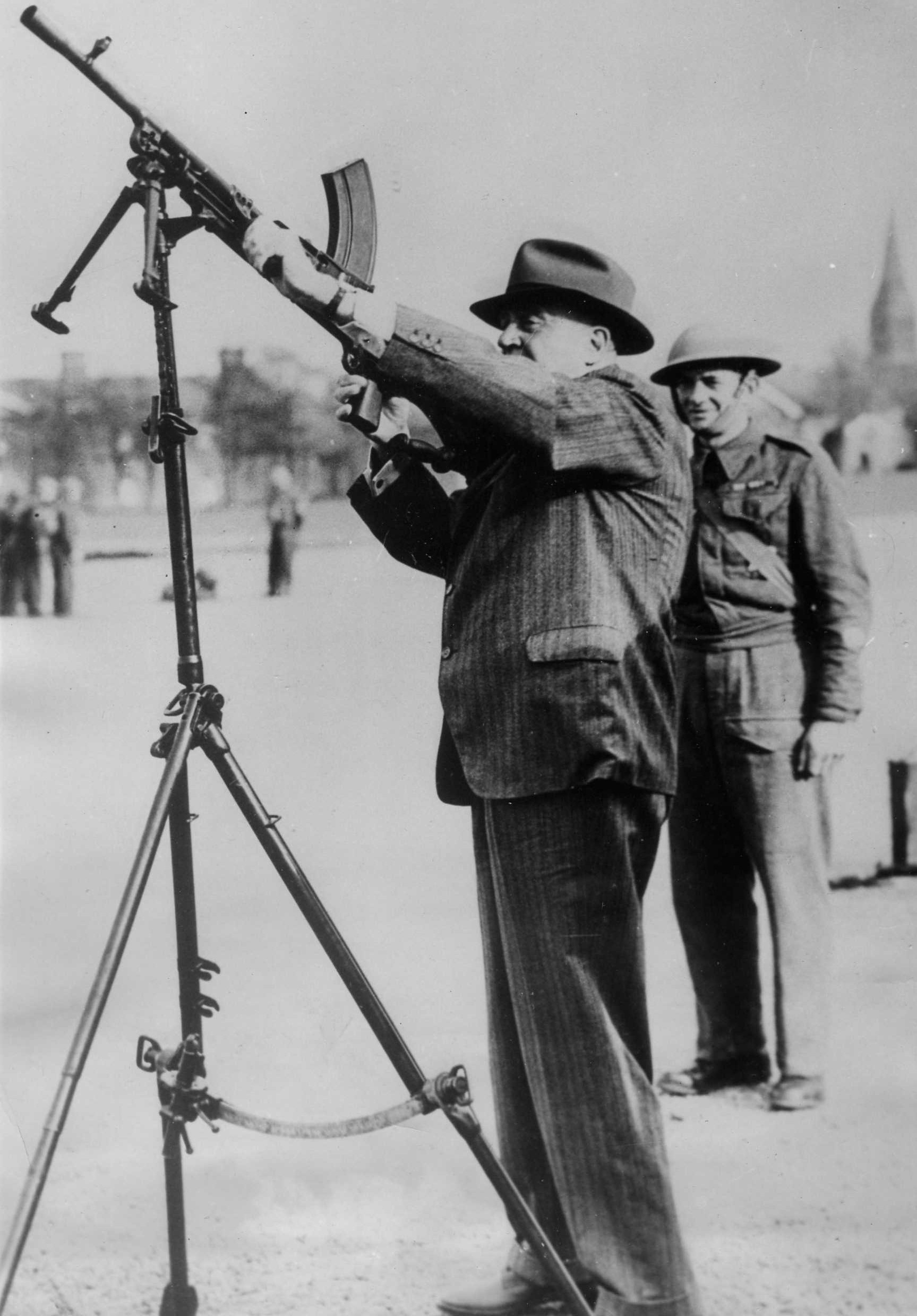
Deneys Reitz as Minister of Native Affairs visiting a British Army camp in Aldershot on 22 November 1939

The South African Party formed a coalition government with the National Party in 1933, next year establishing the United Party. In this government Reitz accepted the office of minister of agriculture and irrigation, later minister of agriculture. In 1939, he became Minister of Native Affairs and Deputy Prime Minister until December 1942, when he was appointed as South African High Commissioner to London, where he would die in office in 1944.

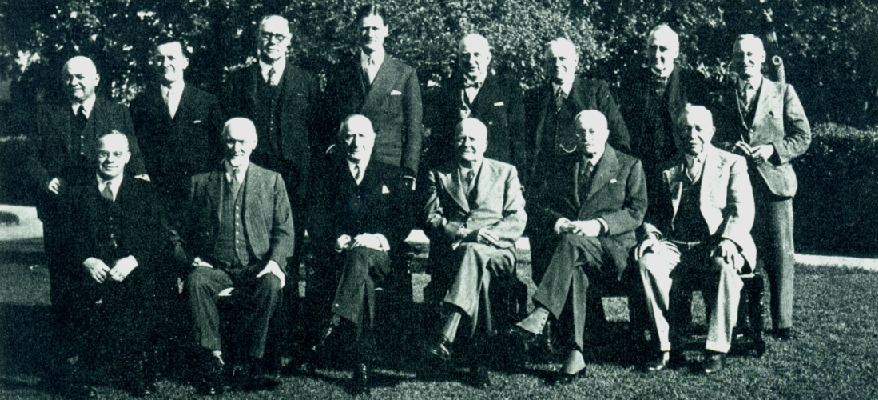
Jan Smuts' United Party Cabinet c.1939. Deneys Reitz is third from right in the front row.

== Legacy and honours ==
The town of Deneysville in the Free State is named after Reitz. The town was founded in 1936 next to a dam on the Vaal River Reitz had built during his tenure as Minister for Lands.

His eponymous law firm, Deneys Reitz Inc., went on to become one of the leading firms in South Africa, before it merged with Norton Rose Fulbright in 2011. In November 2025 it was announced that the South African arm of the firm would split into a separate business from March 31, 2026 and operate under the name of Deneys.

Reitz was mentioned in dispatches in the First World War and twice offered the Distinguished Service Order. The first time had to refused due to his family's opposition to his fighting in the British Army, and the second time due to South African legislation prohibiting the acceptance of foreign titles.

Reitz helped to establish the Kruger National Park and develop it for tourists as one of its first trustees. A plaque near Balule on the Olifants River commemorates his involvement.

== Personal life ==
In 1920 Reitz he married Leila Agnes Buissiné Wright (Cape Town, 13 December 1887 - Cape Town, 29 December 1959). She was a social reformer, an outspoken advocate of women's rights and suffrage for women, and the first woman member of the Assembly (representative for Parktown in Johannesburg, 1933–1944). They had two sons:

1. Jan "John" Deneys Reitz (5 December 1920 - 14 February 2003). He married Helen Winifred Hotson on 3 November 1945, and had issue. As a boy he lost a hand and an eye in an explosives accident.
2. Claude Michael Deneys Reitz (2 March 1923 - 2 September 1952). Known as Michael, he took a BA at University of Cambridge, and served as a lieutenant in the South African Air Force. He died in a training aircraft collision near Barberton, and is commemorated alongside his parents at Mariepskop.

In 1935 Reitz bought a farm near to Mariepskop, along with some land on the hill. He had intended to retire there but died suddenly from a cerebral embolism in 1944 whilst serving as the South African High Commissioner in Britain. He described the area as:

[...] a piece of land more beautiful, in my eyes, than anything in the country. It has a crystal clear mountain torrent of its own, it has flower-carpeted forests and from the rim one looks down a mighty gorge and almost the whole of the Low Country lies stretched beyond.

Reitz's funeral memorial is located south of Mariepskop, approximately 10 km (6.2 mi) east of the Blyde River Canyon in Mpumalanga, alongside those of his wife and younger son Michael.

== Published works ==
Three volumes of an autobiography:

- Commando: A Boer Journal Of The Boer War, first published in Great Britain in 1929, ISBN 0-571-08778-7
- Trekking On (1933), dealing with the Boer War through World War I, and
- No Outspan (1943), which covers life in South African politics between the wars and concludes with him as Deputy Prime Minister of South Africa.

Also published in one volume:

- "The Trilogy of Deneys Reitz", by Deneys Reitz, Wolfe Publishing Co., 1994 (Reprint), ISBN 1-879356-39-2

Other works:

- "God Does Not Forget: The Story of a Boer War Commando"
- "The Long Way Home"
