= Maritz rebellion =

1914 pro-German insurrection in South Africa

- Part of the Boer Wars and the South West Africa campaign of World War I
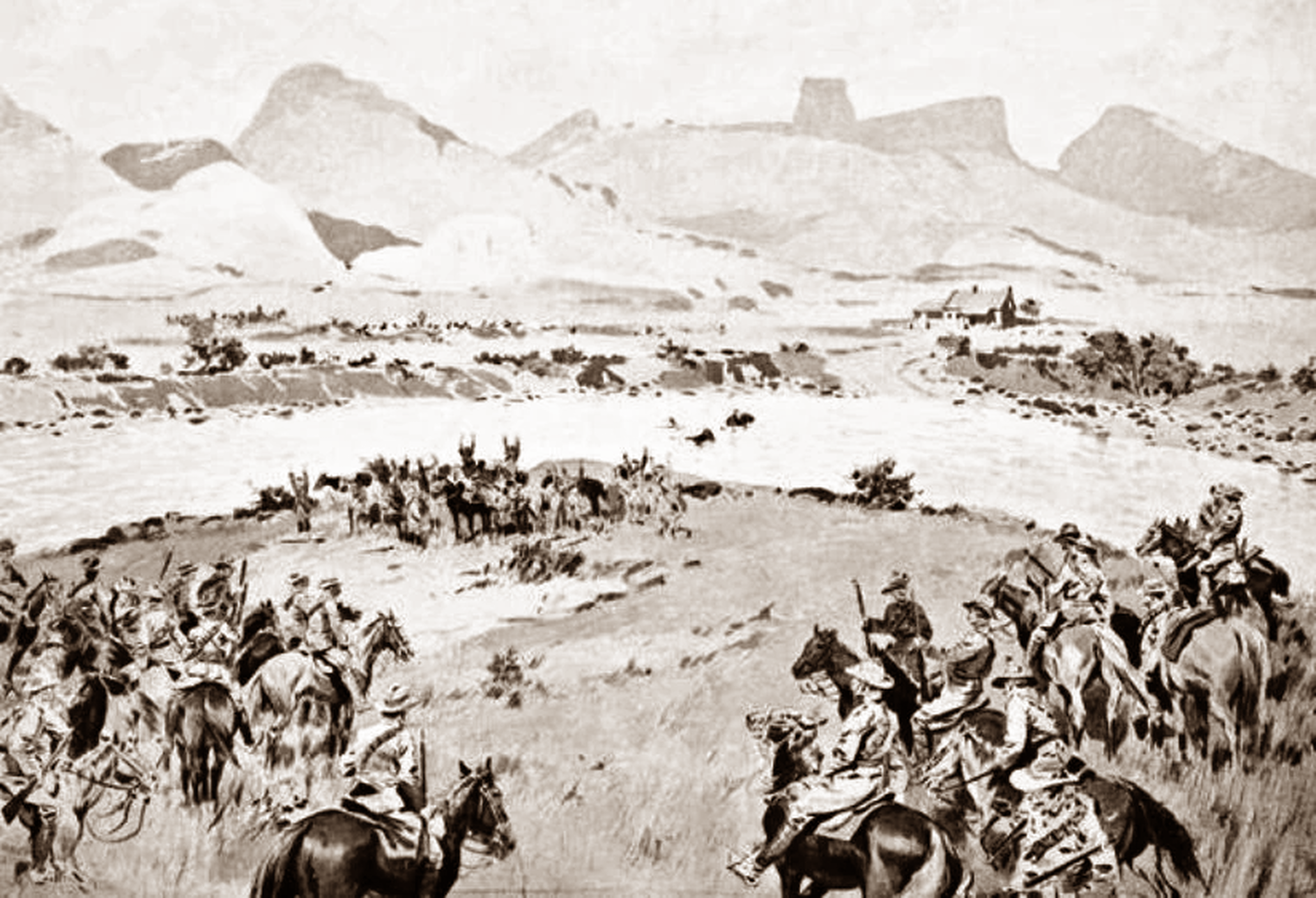
- The Battle of Mushroom Valley, one of the most decisive battles in the Maritz rebellion
Date	15 September 1914 – 4 February 1915 (4 months, 2 weeks and 6 days)
Location	South Africa 25.7167°S 28.2333°E
Result	South African government victory: Rebellion suppressed; South Africa occupies German South West Africa; Rise of the National Party

Belligerents
British Empire: Union of South Africa	South African Republic; Supported by: German Empire

Commanders and leaders
(Union of South Africa) Louis Botha (Union of South Africa) Jan Smuts	Manie Maritz; Christian Beyers †; Christiaan de Wet (POW); Jan Kemp (surrendered); Jopie Fourie (executed)

Strength
32,000	12,000

Casualties and losses
101+ killed or wounded	124–190 killed 300 dead from illness 229–400 wounded 1 executed
- Location within Gauteng Maritz rebellion (South Africa) Maritz rebellion (Africa)

The Maritz rebellion, also known as the Third Boer War, or the Five Shilling rebellion, was an armed pro-German insurrection in South Africa in 1914, at the start of World War I. It was led by Boers who supported the re-establishment of the South African Republic in the Transvaal. Many members of the South African government were themselves Boers who had fought with the Maritz rebels against the British in the Second Boer War, which had ended twelve years earlier. The rebellion failed, with at least 124 out of 12,000 rebels killed in battle, another 300 dying during a retreat into the Kalahari Desert, and at least 229 wounded. The surviving ringleaders received heavy fines and prison terms. One of them, Jopie Fourie, was executed.

== Background ==
At the end of the Second Boer War twelve years earlier, all former Boer combatants had been asked to sign a pledge that they would abide by the peace terms. Some, like Deneys Reitz, refused and were exiled from South Africa. Over the following decade many returned home, and not all of them signed the pledge upon returning. At the end of the Second Boer War, those Boers who had fought to the end were known as Bittereinders.

A German journalist who interviewed the former Boer general J. B. M. Hertzog for the Tägliche Rundschau wrote:

Hertzog believes that the fruit of the three-year struggle by the Boers is that their freedom, in the form of a general South African Republic, will fall into their laps as soon as England is involved in a war with a Continental power.

—

Paraphrasing the Irish Nationalists' "England's misfortune is the bitter enders' opportunity," the "bitter enders" and their supporters saw the start of World War I as that opportunity, particularly since England's enemy, Germany, had been their old supporter.

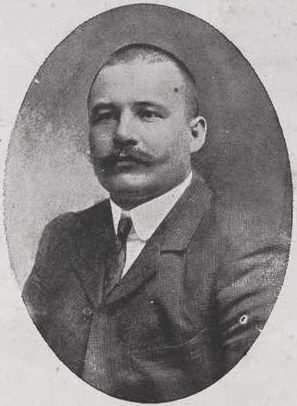
Manie Maritz

The outbreak of hostilities in Europe in August 1914 had long been anticipated, and the government of the Union of South Africa was well aware of the significance of the common border South Africa shared with the German colony of South-West Africa. Prime Minister Louis Botha informed London that South Africa could defend itself and that the imperial garrison could depart for France; when the British government asked Botha whether his forces would invade German South-West Africa, the reply was that they could and would.

South African troops were mobilised along the border between the two countries under the command of General Henry Lukin and Lieutenant Colonel Manie Maritz early in September 1914. On 19 September 1914 another force occupied the German port of Lüderitz.

== Rebellion ==
The Commandant-General of the Union Defence Force, Brigadier-General Christiaan Frederick Beyers was opposed to the South African government's decision to undertake offensive operations. He resigned his commission on 15 September 1914, writing "It is sad that the war is being waged against the 'barbarism' of the Germans. We have forgiven but not forgotten all the barbarities committed in our own country during the South African War", referring to the atrocities committed during the Boer War. A nominated senator, General Koos de la Rey, who had refused to support the government in parliament over this issue, associated himself with Beyers. On 15 September they set off together to visit Major JCG (Jan) Kemp in Potchefstroom, who had a large armoury and a force of 2,000 men who had just finished training, many of whom were thought to be sympathetic to the rebels' ideas.

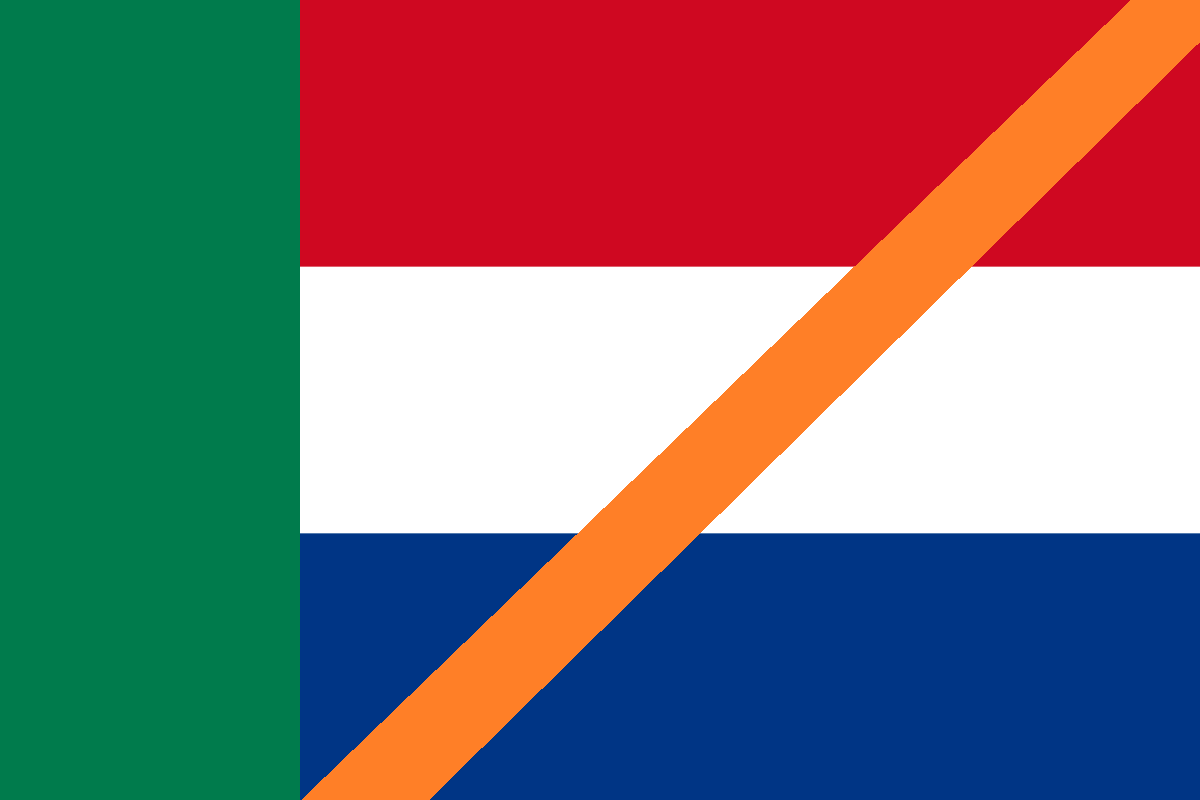
Flag of the Maritz Rebellion, 1914

Although it is not known what the purpose of their visit was, the South African government believed it to be an attempt to instigate a rebellion, as stated in the Government Blue Book on the rebellion. According to General Beyers it was to discuss plans for the simultaneous resignation of leading army officers as protest against the government's actions, similar to what had happened in Britain two years earlier in the Curragh incident over the Irish Home Rule Bill. On the way to the meeting de la Rey's car was fired upon by a policeman at a road block set up to look for the Foster gang. De la Rey was hit and killed. At his funeral, however, many Nationalist Afrikaners believed and perpetuated the rumour that it was a government assassination, which added fuel to the fire. Their anger was even further inflamed by Siener van Rensburg and his controversial prophecies.

Lt-Col Maritz, who was head of a commando of Union forces on the border of German South-West Africa, allied himself with the Germans. He then issued a proclamation on behalf of a provisional government. It stated that "the former South African Republic and Orange Free State as well as the Cape Province and Natal are proclaimed free from British control and independent, and every White inhabitant of the mentioned areas, of whatever nationality, are hereby called upon to take their weapons in their hands and realize the long-cherished ideal of a Free and Independent South Africa." It was announced that Generals Beyers, de Wet, Maritz, Kemp and Bezuidenhout were to be the first leaders of this provisional government. Maritz's forces occupied Keimoes in the Upington area. The Lydenburg commando under General De Wet took possession of the town of Heilbron, held up a train and captured government stores and ammunition. Some of the prominent citizens of the area joined him, and by the end of the week he had a force of 3,000 men. Beyers also gathered a force in the Magaliesberg; in all, about 12,000 rebels rallied to the cause. Meanwhile, General Louis Botha had around 32,000 troops to counter the rebels, of which about 20,000 were Afrikaners.

The government declared martial law on 12 October 1914, and forces loyal to the government under the command of General Louis Botha and Jan Smuts proceeded to destroy the rebellion. General Maritz was defeated on 24 October and took refuge with the Germans. The Beyers commando was attacked and dispersed at Commissioners Drift on 28 October, after which Beyers joined forces with Kemp, but drowned in the Vaal River on 8 December. General de Wet was captured in Bechuanaland on 1 December 1914, with 52 others on a farm called Waterbury. His remark when captured was: "Thank God it was not an Englishman who captured me after all". His grandson, Dr Carel de Wet, then Minister of Health, consecrated a monument at this spot on 14 February 1970. General Kemp, having taken his commando across the Kalahari Desert, losing 300 out of 800 men and most of their horses on the 1,100 kilometre month-long trek, joined Maritz in German South-West Africa, but returned after about a week and surrendered on 4 February 1915.

== Aftermath ==
After the Maritz rebellion was suppressed, the South African army continued their operations into German South West Africa and conquered it by July 1915.

Compared to the fate of the ringleaders of the Easter Rising in Ireland in 1916, the leading Boer rebels got off relatively lightly with terms of imprisonment of six and seven years and heavy fines. Two years later they were released from prison, as Louis Botha recognised the value of reconciliation.

One notable exception was Jopie Fourie, a Union Defence Force officer who had failed to resign his commission before joining the rebellion. Fourie's Commando had inflicted 40 percent of the casualties on government forces and fired on them during a brief truce. In one instance, Fourie's men shot and killed a soldier, William Allan King, who had been tending to a wounded man. Ironically, Fourie and King had been good friends before the rebellion.

Fourie was sentenced to death and executed by firing squad in the courtyard of Pretoria Central Prison on 20 December 1914. In a letter written hours before his execution, Fourie wrote, "The tree which has been planted and which is wetted with my blood will grow large and bear delightful fruit."

== See also ==
- African theatre of World War I
- Jan Smuts and the Old Boers
- Bambatha Rebellion
- Leliefontein massacre (also involved Manie Maritz)
- Rand Rebellion

== Sources ==
- Bunting, Brian (1969), "Chapter 1: The Birth of the Nationalist Party", The Rise of the South African Reich, archived from the original on 24 September 2009
- Martel, Gordon (2011), A Companion to Europe, 1900 – 1945, John Wiley & Sons, p. 290, ISBN 978-1-4443-9167-1
- Plaatje, Sol (1916), "Chapter XXIII – The Boer Rebellion", Native Life in South Africa, P. S. King in London
- Oakes, Dougie, ed. (1992). Illustrated history of South Africa: the real story. Reader's Digest Association South Africa. ISBN 978-0-947008-90-1.
- Orford, J.G. (Correlator) (17 May 1971), Reflections on the possible influence of "Siener" van Rensburg's visions on General J.H. "Koos" de la Rey and some of the results, Military History Journal – Vol 2 No 2
- Union of South Africa (1915), Report on the Outbreak of the Rebellion and the Policy of the Government with regard to its Suppression, Cape Town: SA Government, pp. 26, 63–67
