= Battle of Nooitgedacht =

1900 battle of the Second Boer War

- Part of Second Boer War
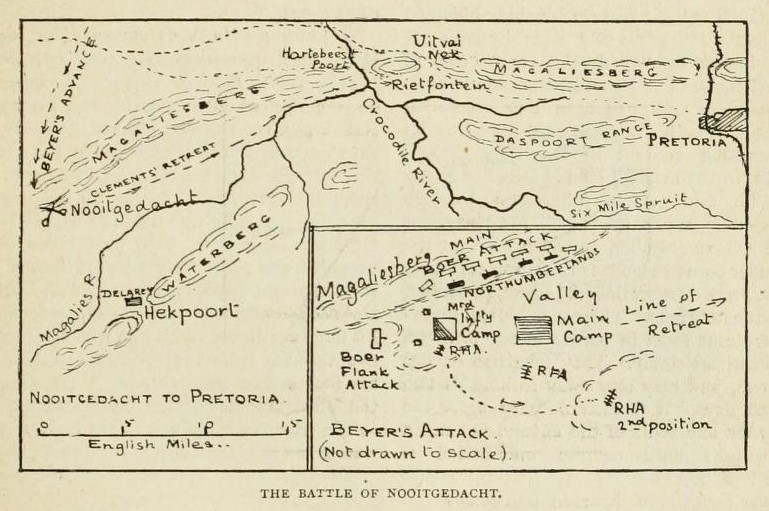
- Plan of the battle of Nooitgedacht (Battles of the nineteenth century, 1901)
Date	13 December 1900
Location	Transvaal, South Africa 25°51′36″S 27°33′11″E
Result	Boer victory

Belligerents
United Kingdom	South African Republic

Commanders and leaders
Ralph Clements	Koos de la Rey; Christiaan Beyers; Jan Kemp

Strength
1,500	2,100

Casualties and losses
650 killed, wounded and captured	30 killed

In the Battle of Nooitgedacht on 13 December 1900, Boer commandos led by Generals Koos de la Rey and Christiaan Beyers combined to deal a defeat to a British brigade under the command of Major General R. A. P. Clements during the Second Boer War.

== Background ==
Lord Roberts captured Pretoria on 5 June and the armies soon passed to the east. After the guerrilla war began, a force under Clements harried the Boers in the Moot, a valley in the Magaliesberg mountains. By the end of the year, the British grew careless. On 2 December, De la Rey's commando ambushed an ox-wagon convoy east of Rustenburg, killing and wounding 64 British soldiers and capturing 54 men and 118 wagons. De la Rey's deputy, Jan Smuts had a close call when a bullet intended for him killed another Boer. The raiders appropriated the boots and clothing and burned the rest of the supplies, while setting their prisoners free.

De la Rey scouted Clement's camp at Nooitgedacht for three days. The camp had good water supply and a nearby mountain allowed communication by heliograph with Major General Robert Broadwood at Rustenburg. However, the site was dominated on the north by a 300-metre (980 ft) mountain. A 1500-man commando led by General Beyers soon arrived, giving the Boers numerical superiority over their adversaries. Smuts later wrote, "I do not think it was possible to have selected a more fatal spot for a camp."

== Battle ==
The Boer leaders soon agreed on a plan. Half of Beyers' men would stay behind to keep Broadwood from marching to the rescue. The remainder, about 1500 men, were split into three attacking groups. Beyers would lead his commando against 300 British pickets on the mountaintop. Beyers detached Commandant Badenhorst to attack the camp from the west. De la Rey would capture several kopjes in the Moot to the south. If all went well, Clements' brigade would be trapped and destroyed.

In the event, Badenhorst's column blundered into the British picket lines in the pre-dawn darkness. In a brief fusillade at close range, the Boers were driven back, with losses on both sides. The alerted British now manned their defensive positions. Beyers then launched his attack on the mountaintop, but his tired men were soon stopped by sturdy resistance from the Northumberland Fusiliers. After witnessing De la Rey's initial attack being repulsed in the valley below, Beyer's men became inspired and stormed the British positions on the mountaintop. Deneys Reitz, fighting in Beyer's commando, reports that the Boers were enraged by British shouts of triumph: "stung by their cries our whole force, on some sudden impulse, started to its feet and went pouring forward. There was no stopping us now, and we swept on shouting and yelling, men dropping freely as we went". After losing about 100 casualties in the resulting melee, Captain Yatman surrendered at about 7:00 am. Reinforcements climbing the mountain lost heavily when Beyers' men suddenly poured fire into them.

That morning it was too hazy to flash a message to Broadwood, so Clements was entirely on his own. Meanwhile, De la Rey and Smuts had managed to capture all the kopjes in the Moot except one, Yeomanry Hill (Hartebeestfontein). Clements alertly and swiftly concentrated his survivors on this position. At 8:00 am, the British drove away a group of Boers who had gained a foothold on Yeomanry Hill. They then worked furiously to make the hill defensible. A 4.7-inch naval gun was even saved by rolling it downhill from its original perch and dragging it back to the main British position.

Meanwhile, the men under Beyers turned aside to loot the British camp and nothing the Boer general could do would get them back to the battle. Deneys Reitz remarked, "We were refitted from head to heel." At 4:00 pm, Clements and the remnant of his brigade rode off with his artillery toward Pretoria. Their retreat was virtually unopposed because the Boers were exhausted and by this time De la Rey's men had joined the other Boers in plundering the enemy camp.

== Aftermath ==
Thanks to his quick response to the crisis, Clements saved his brigade from annihilation. However, the general lost half his brigade due to his poor choice for a camp. The Imperial forces suffered no consequences from their defeat aside from the casualties suffered and the supplies lost. Within a short time, a column under Clements was again harassing the Moot.
