= Battle of Rooiwal =

1902 battle of the Second Boer War

- Part of Second Boer War
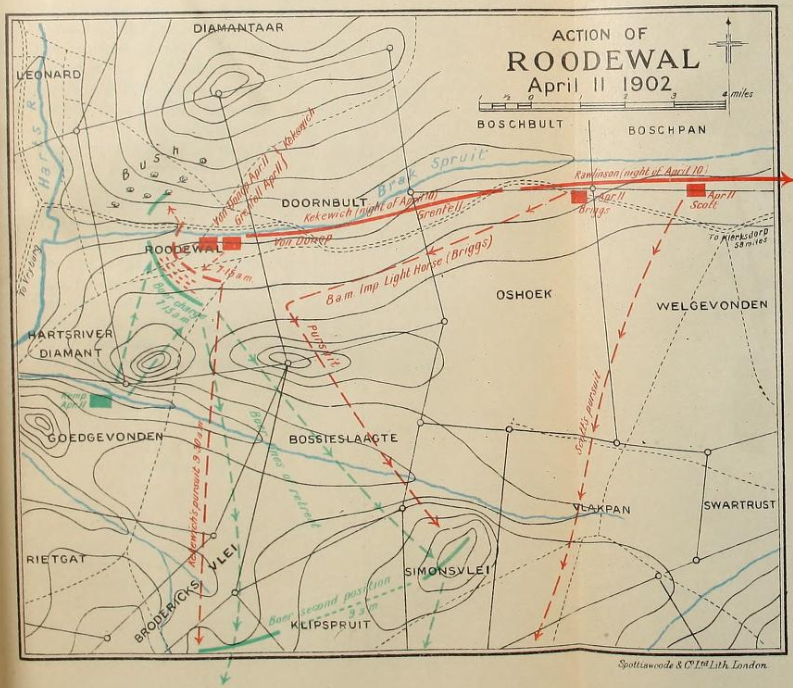
- The British operational map of the Battle of Rooiwal.
Date	11 April 1902
Location	Rooiwal, South African Republic
Result	British victory

Belligerents
United Kingdom	South African Republic; Orange Free State

Commanders and leaders
Robert Kekewich; Ian Hamilton; Henry Rawlinson	Ferdinandus Potgieter †; Jan Kemp; Petrus Liebenberg

Strength
3,000	1,700 – 2,600

Casualties and losses
12 killed (2 officers); 75 wounded (10 officers); Total: 87 casualties	51 killed; 40 wounded; 31 captured; Total: 110 – 163 casualties; 3 guns captured

The Battle of Rooiwal was an engagement of the Second Boer War. It took place on 11 April 1902 in the third phase of the conflict and resulted in a victory by a British force commanded by Colonel Robert Kekewich over a Boer commando led by Generals Ferdinandus Jacobus Potgieter and Jan Kemp. The action consisted of a Boer attack on horseback on an entrenched British hillside position in the valley of Rooiwal, near Klerksdorp in the Western Transvaal. The Boers were attempting to break out of a British encircling manoeuvre. Their attack was repulsed at some cost to the Boers in killed and injured.

The engagement was the last major battle in the Second Boer War.

== Background ==
By 1902, there were roughly 3,000 Boer guerrillas operating in Western Transvaal. There were three separate Boer commandos under the overall command of De La Rey. By this time, many Boer fighters had surrendered and some were now working for the British as National Scouts. Those who remained in the field were referred to as 'bitter-einders' (Afrikaans for fighters to the bitter end, diehards). Their situation was very difficult as the British had stripped the veld of food and supplies and had systematically burned Boer farms and homes to deny the guerrillas shelter. Nevertheless, De La Rey's men were able to supply themselves with weapons, food and clothing which they had captured from the British.

They also remained a dangerous enemy and on a number of occasions they had scored victories against British troops. On 24 February 1902, for example, they had mauled a British column at Yser Spruit and on 7 March had captured a British general (Lord Methuen) and six field guns at Tweebosch, after routing his command. One reason for the continued Boers successes was the poor quality of some of the British troops in the theatre. Herbert Kitchener had over 16,000 troops operating in the Western Transvaal, but many of them were not regulars, but poorly trained Imperial Yeomanry.

Kitchener's strategy for bringing the war to an end was to build fortified blockhouses across the veld and to mount 'drives' or sweeps of the countryside with mobile columns. The first such sweep in the spring of 1902 lasted from 23 March to 30 March, but produced few results in terms of destroying the Boer commandos. Indeed, the British troops suffered a reverse at Boschbult, taking 178 casualties.

== Hamilton's drive ==
On 6 April, Kitchener put Colonel Ian Hamilton in command of another drive to try to trap De La Rey's fighters. The plan was to 'squeeze' the Boers against the British mobile columns and a line of blockhouses and entrenchments at Klerksdorp. Colonel Robert Kekewich, who was in command of one of Kitchener's columns, dug in at Rooiwal to strengthen his left flank. Having mistakenly gotten tangled up with another British column under Colonel Henry Rawlinson, Kekewich was ordered by Hamilton to proceed to Rooiwal, where he arrived on 10 April. This change of plan proved to be a fortunate one for the British, because the Boers had scouted the Rooiwal position earlier and found it weakly defended. Dug in on the hillside at Rooiwal were about 3,000 mounted infantry, supported by 6 field guns and 2 pom poms.

== The battle ==
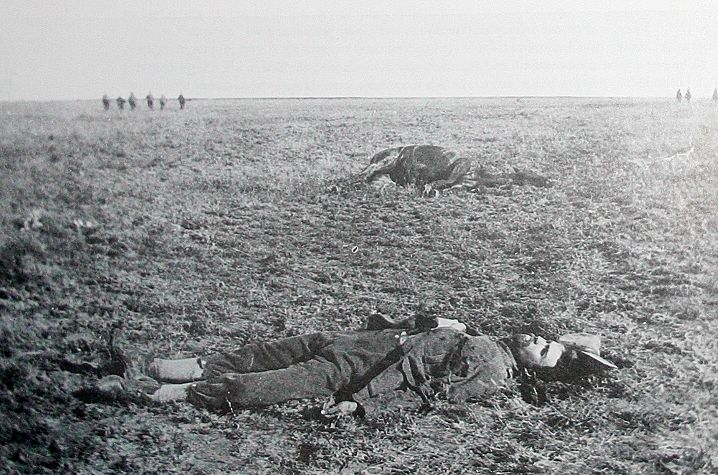
Commandant Potgieter sprawled in the grass thirty yards from the British line. He and 50 of his men died charging the British line on horseback.

The Boers, however, did not know of the British deployment and they still believed that Rooiwal was only lightly held. One of their commandos, under Commandant Potgieter and General Kemp, therefore tried to overrun the British position early on the morning of 11 April, in an effort to escape Hamilton's 'drive'. Potgieter had around 1,700 men, all mounted riflemen.

At around 7:15 am on 11 April, they charged the British position on horseback, firing from the saddle. A British picket of 40 mounted infantry was overrun, taking 20 casualties. Kekewich's position was a strong one, but the sight of the charging Boers panicked some of the inexperienced British troops and a number of Yeoman units fled the scene of the battle and were not stopped until they were a mile away from the fighting. A Lieutenant Carlos Hickie managed to stop the stampede with a mixture of pleas and threats. In addition, a number of the regular British officers on the scene were very critical of the 'wild' shooting of their men.

In spite of this, however, the Boer charge was stopped about 30 metres from the British line by artillery and rifle fire. Fifty Boers were killed outright and more were wounded. Among the dead was Potgieter, wearing a distinctive blue shirt. Kekewich later commented that, 'one good company of infantry could have killed 300 Boers'. The surviving Boers made good their retreat. Boer fire, delivered from the saddle, had produced about 50 casualties in the British line.

Ian Hamilton and Rawlinson arrived on the scene just as the fighting was ending. However, Hamilton delayed the pursuit of the beaten Boers as he feared that the retreat was a ruse and that his men would fall into Boer ambushes. At about 9:45, or 90 minutes after the Boer charge had been repulsed, Hamilton sent his mounted troops in pursuit of the enemy. They captured a further 50 Boers and re-captured the artillery lost at Tweebosch.

Kitchener had issued orders that Boers captured wearing British uniforms were to be shot. However, although a number of wounded Boers were indeed wearing captured British khaki, Hamilton ordered that they be spared.

== Aftermath ==
The battle was a setback for the Boers, but their casualties were relatively light and most of their fighters escaped the action unscathed. In any case, peace talks to end the war were already imminent. They began on 19 May in Pretoria. De La Rey, the Boers' commander in the Western Transvaal was one of the Boer negotiators.

== Bibliography ==
- Amery, Leo; Childers, Erskine, eds. (1907). The Times History of The War in South Africa 1899–1902. Vol. V. Sampson Low, Marston & Co. ISBN 9781017842623.
- Pakenham, Thomas (1979). The Boer War. Random House. ISBN 0-394-42742-4.
- Pakenham, Thomas (1993) [1979]. The Boer War (Illustrated ed.). Weidenfeld & Nicolson. ISBN 0-297-83222-0.
- Pretorius, Fransjohan (2009). The A to Z of the Anglo-Boer War. Scarecrow Press, Inc. ISBN 978-0-8108-7629-3.
