= Koos de la Rey =

South African military officer during the Boer Wars (1847–1914)

Jacobus Herculaas de la Rey
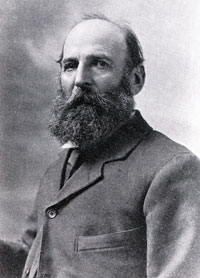
- Born: 22 October 1847; Doornfontein, Winburg, Orange River Sovereignty
- Died: 15 September 1914 (aged 66); Main Reef Road, Langlaagte, Johannesburg, South Africa
- Spouse: Jacoba Elizabeth (Nonnie) Greeff
- Children: 12 biological 6 fostered
- Military career
- Allegiance: Orange Free State; South African Republic; Union of South Africa
- Rank: General
- Nicknames: Koos; Leeu van die Wes Transvaal (translation: Lion of West Transvaal)
- Conflicts: Basotho War of 1865; Sekhukhune's War of 1876; First Boer War; Second Boer War; Battle of Ladysmith; Siege of Ladysmith (2nd battle); Battle of Graspan; Battle of Modder River; Battle of Magersfontein; Battle of Doornkop; Battle of Diamond Hill; Battle of Elands River (1900); Battle of Nooitgedacht; Battle of Middelfontein; Battle of Tweebosch
- Other work: Member of the Transvaal Parliament, Delegate to National Convention, Senator

Jacobus Herculaas de la Rey (Afrikaans pronunciation: [jaˈkuəbɵs hærkyˈlɑːs də la ˈrɛi]) (22 October 1847 – 15 September 1914), better known as Koos de la Rey, a South African military officer, served as a Transvaal Boer general during the Second Boer War of 1899 to 1902. De la Rey also had a political career and was one of the leading advocates of Boer independence. His death at the hands of the South African Police under controversial circumstances had a major role in sparking the Maritz rebellion of 1914 to 1915.

== Early life ==
Born on Doornfontein Farm in the Winburg District of the Orange Free State, Koos was the son of Adrianus Johannes Gijsbertus de la Rey and Adriana Wilhelmina van Rooyen. De la Rey was a Boer of French Huguenot, Spanish and Dutch descent. His grandfather, a school teacher and the patriarch of the De la Rey family in South Africa, came from Utrecht, Netherlands. After the Battle of Boomplaats, the family farm was confiscated by the British and the family trekked into the Transvaal and settled in Lichtenburg. As a child De la Rey received very little formal education. The De la Rey family moved, this time to Kimberley after the discovery of diamonds. As a young man, de la Rey worked as a transport rider on the routes serving the diamond diggings at Kimberley.

== Marriage ==
De la Rey married Jacoba Elizabeth (Nonnie) Greeff and the couple settled on Manana, the Greeff family farm. Manana had belonged to Jacoba's father Hendrik Adriaan Greeff, the founder of Lichtenburg. Later De la Rey bought the farm Elandsfontein. They had twelve children and they looked after another six children who had lost their parents. De la Rey was deeply religious and a small pocket Bible was rarely out of his hand. He had formidable looks – a long neatly trimmed brown beard and a high forehead with deep-set eyes that gave him a prematurely patriarchal appearance. His sister Cornelia was married to Pieter Van der Hoff, who was a nephew of Dirk Van der Hoff, founder of the Transvaal's state Church.

== Military campaigns ==
De la Rey fought in the Basotho War of 1865 and Sekhukhune's War of 1876. He did not take a very active part in the First Boer War, but as field cornet in the western Transvaal, he took over Piet Cronjé's Potchefstroom siege (1880–1881) when Cronjé fell ill. He was elected commandant of the Lichtenburg district, and became a member of the Transvaal Volksraad in 1883. A supporter of the progressive faction under General Piet Joubert, he opposed Paul Kruger's policies against the uitlanders, the foreigners who flocked to the Transvaal gold-rush, and warned it would lead to war with Britain.

== Second Boer War ==
=== Kraaipan ===
On the outbreak of war, De la Rey was appointed one of Piet Cronjé's field generals. De la Rey led an attack that resulted in the first shots of the war being fired at Kraaipan in an attack on a British armored train that was on its way from Vryburg to Mafeking. The train was derailed and after a five-hour fight, the British surrendered. This incident made De la Rey famous, but exacerbated his conflicts with the cautious and unimaginative Cronjé, who sent him to block the advance of the British forces moving to relieve the Siege of Kimberley.

=== Graspan ===
Lieutenant General Lord Methuen, commander of the 1st Division, was tasked with raising the Boer siege of Kimberley and moved his force by rail to Belmont station in the northern Cape Province. Upon detraining, they came under fire from a small force of Boers led by Commandant J. Prinsloo on Belmont Kopje. By the next morning, the British were in position to shell and then charge the hill despite some losses. The Boers retreated to their horses at the back of the koppie and fell back to Graspan, rejoining the larger force of Free-Staters and Transvaalers under the command of Prinsloo and De la Rey respectively. Here the Boers occupied several koppies but with no better luck as they were similarly forced off by artillery and infantry charges. The way lay open for Methuen's force to the Modder (Mud) River crossing where the Boers had blown up the railway bridge.

=== Modder River ===
Having realised that the traditional Boer tactic of fighting from higher ground exposed them to the superior British artillery, De la Rey insisted that his men and Prinsloo's Free-Staters dig in on the banks of the Modder and Riet Rivers, the first use of trench warfare in the war. The plan was to hold fire until the British had approached close enough for the Boers' advantage in rifle fire to take effect, while making it difficult for the full force of the British artillery to be used. In the early hours the British troops advanced across the plain unopposed, but Prinsloo's men opened fire at long range, the troops took cover and the artillery pounded the Boer trenches. A series of British rushes pushed the Free-Staters back across the ford, and only a counter-attack led by De la Rey enabled the Boers to hold the field until dusk, when they slipped away. De la Rey was wounded and his son Adriaan was killed; he blamed Cronjé for failing to send reinforcements.

=== Magersfontein ===
After the Boers were forced back from the Modder River, the British spent some time repairing the Modder River bridge, while De la Rey had his men entrench on flat ground at the base of the Magersfontein hill. His controversial tactic was vindicated on 10 December when the hill was intensively shelled to no effect. Before dawn the following day, the crack Highland regiments were ordered to advance in close order. They alerted the defenders by stumbling across wires hung with tin cans and were soon pinned down. After nine hours taking heavy losses, including the brigade commander, Major General Wauchope, without managing to advance at all, they finally broke and retreated in disorder. The battle caused public mourning in Scotland and Methuen was sidelined; the relief of Kimberley would be entrusted to Lord Roberts.

=== Boer defeat ===
Nevertheless, Magersfontein and the disasters on the Tugela River were the low point of the British campaign and, thereafter, with massive reinforcements from all over the Empire, they gradually fought their way back. At Paardeberg (8 February 1900), while De la Rey was away rallying resistance to Major General French's advance in the Colesberg area of the Cape, the helpless Cronjé was trapped by Roberts and surrendered with his entire army. Bloemfontein was taken on 13 March 1900, Pretoria on 5 June; Kruger fled to Portuguese East Africa.

=== Guerrilla war ===
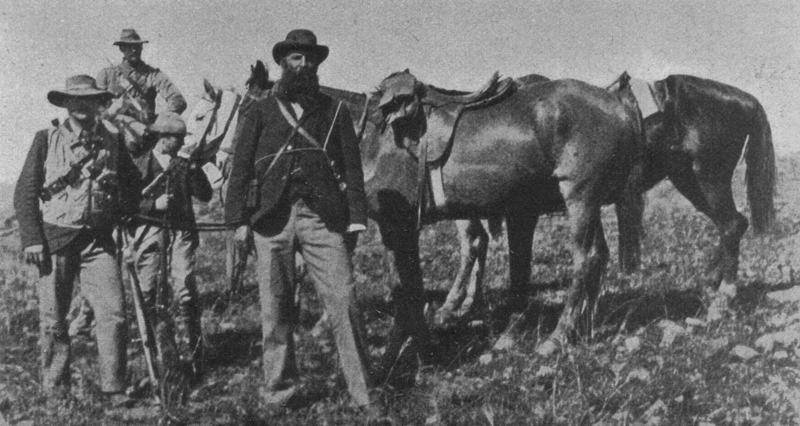
Koos de la Rey in 1902

Only a hard core of Boers were willing to remain in the field. De la Rey, Louis Botha and other commanders met near Kroonstad and laid down a new strategy of guerrilla war. The Western Transvaal fell to De la Rey, and for the next two years he led a mobile campaign, winning battles at Moedwil, Nooitgedacht, Driefontein, Donkerhoek and other places, and inflicting large losses of men and material on the British at Ysterspruit on 25 February 1902, where enough ammunition and supplies were captured to reinvigorate the Boer forces. At Tweebosch on 7 March 1902, a large part of Methuen's rear-guard was captured, including Methuen himself. Albeit ragged and often hungry, De la Rey's men roamed at will over vast areas and tied down tens of thousands of British troops. De la Rey had an uncanny knack for avoiding ambush, leading many to believe that he was advised by the prophet Siener van Rensburg, who accompanied him. Despite some reverses, such as the Battle of Rooiwal in April 1902, De la Rey's commandos, numbering up to 3,000 men, remained in the field until the end of the war.

=== Chivalry ===
De la Rey was noted for chivalrous behaviour towards his enemies. For example, at Tweebosch on 7 March 1902 he captured Lieutenant General Methuen along with several hundred of his troops. The troops were sent back to their lines because De la Rey had no means to support them, and Methuen was also released since he had broken his leg when his own horse had fallen on him.

== Peace ==
In order to defeat the Boer guerrillas, the British (initially under Lord Roberts then under Lord Kitchener) adopted a scorched earth counter-insurgency policy which aimed to cut off all sources of aid to the Bittereinders. This included destroying all Boer-owned farmsteads in the South African Republic and the Orange Free State and interning captured Boer and native African civilians in concentration camps, which had high mortality rates due to a combination of infectious disease outbreaks and abysmal camp conditions. These attritional tactics slowly eroded the will of the remaining Boer guerrillas in the field to continue the fight, and they gradually came to the conclusion that a peace agreement with the British was necessary to prevent further suffering among the Boer population.

The British offered terms of peace on various occasions, most notably in March 1901, but Botha rejected the idea. Lord Kitchener requested that De la Rey meet with him at Klerksdorp on 11 March 1902 for a parley. The two enemies formed a bond of friendship which gave De la Rey confidence in the sincerity of the British proposals. Diplomatic efforts to find a way out of the conflict continued and eventually led to an agreement to hold peace talks at Vereeniging, in which De la Rey took part and urged peace. The belligerents signed the Treaty of Vereeniging on 31 May 1902. De la Rey and General Botha visited England and the United States later in the same year. The Boers, promised eventual self-government (granted in 1906 and 1907 for the Transvaal and Orange Free State respectively), received £3,000,000 compensation, while acknowledging the sovereignty of Edward VII.

After the war De la Rey travelled to Europe with Louis Botha and Christiaan de Wet to raise funds for the impoverished Boers whose families and farms had been devastated. In 1903 he was in India and Ceylon, persuading the prisoners of war interned there to take the oath of allegiance and return to South Africa. Finally he returned to his own farm with his wife and remaining children. Jacoba had spent most of the war trekking in the veld with her children and a few faithful servants; she subsequently wrote a book about her wanderings, Myne Omzwervingen en Beproevingen Gedurende den Oorlog (1903), which was translated into English as "A Woman's Wanderings and Trials During the Anglo-Boer War" translated by Lucy Hotz, and published in London (1903).

== Political career ==
In 1907 De la Rey was elected to the colonial Transvaal Parliament, and he was one of the delegates to the National Convention which led to the Union of South Africa in 1910. He became a Senator and supported Louis Botha, the first Prime Minister, in his attempts to unite Boer and British. An opposing faction led by Hertzog wished to establish republican government as soon as possible and resisted co-operation with the British.

Serious violence broke out in 1914 when white miners on the Rand clashed with police and troops over the use of black miners. De la Rey commanded the government forces and the strikes were put down, but a dangerous atmosphere had formed.

== Opposition to South Africa's involvement in World War I ==
With the outbreak of the First World War, a crisis ensued when Louis Botha agreed to send troops to take over the German colony of South West Africa (now Namibia). Many Boers were opposed to fighting for Britain and against Germany. Also, many were of German descent and Germany had been sympathetic to their struggle so they looked to De la Rey for leadership. In Parliament he advocated neutrality and stated that he was utterly opposed to war unless South Africa was attacked. Nevertheless, he was persuaded by Botha and Jan Smuts not to take any actions which might arouse the Boers. De la Rey appears to have been torn between loyalty to his comrades-in-arms, most of whom had joined the Hertzog faction, and his sense of honour.

Siener van Rensburg attracted large crowds with accounts of his visions in which he saw the whole world consumed by war and the end of the British Empire. On 2 August he told of a dream in which he saw General De la Rey returning home bare-headed in a carriage adorned with flowers, while a black cloud with the number 15 on it poured down blood. The excited Boers took this as a sign that De la Rey would be triumphant, but van Rensburg himself believed the dream warned of death.

=== Death ===
On 15 September 1914 Christian Frederick Beyers, Commandant-General of the armed forces and an old comrade of De la Rey, resigned his commission and sent his car to fetch the latter from Johannesburg to Pretoria as he wished to consult with him. The two generals then set out that evening for Potchefstroom military camp where General JCG Kemp had also resigned. They encountered several police roadblocks but refused to stop; the roadblocks had in fact been set to capture the Foster gang. At Langlaagte the police fired on the speeding car and a bullet struck De la Rey's back, ending his life; his last words were dit is raak ('It hit'). He returned to his Lichtenburg farm as van Rensburg had predicted. Many Boers were convinced he had been deliberately assassinated, while others could not believe that he would have joined a rebellion, breaking his oath. According to Beyers, the plan was to co-ordinate the simultaneous resignation of all the senior officers in protest at the attack on South West Africa. The theory of a government assassination holds sway to this day.

Not long after De la Rey's funeral the short-lived Maritz rebellion broke out and De Wet, Beyers, General Maritz, commander of a force on the border of the German colony, Kemp, and other Boer veterans took up arms again but most of the army remained loyal and the rebellion was swiftly put down by Botha and Smuts. The rebels were pardoned just two years later by Botha in the interests of national reconciliation. While De la Rey would probably have been quite capable of taking to the field again at 67, it seems unlikely he would have gone against his word, especially as he had played such a leading role in bringing about the peace of Vereeniging.

De la Rey was buried in the Lichtenburg graveyard, where a bronze bust by sculptor Fanie Eloff adorns his grave. De la Rey's home on Elandsfontein was demolished during the Boer War, but was rebuilt on the same foundation in 1902. The Voortrekkers movement placed a small memorial to him on his farm. De la Rey's equestrian statue on the De la Rey square of Lichtenburg's city hall, was sculpted by a town resident, Hennie Potgieter.

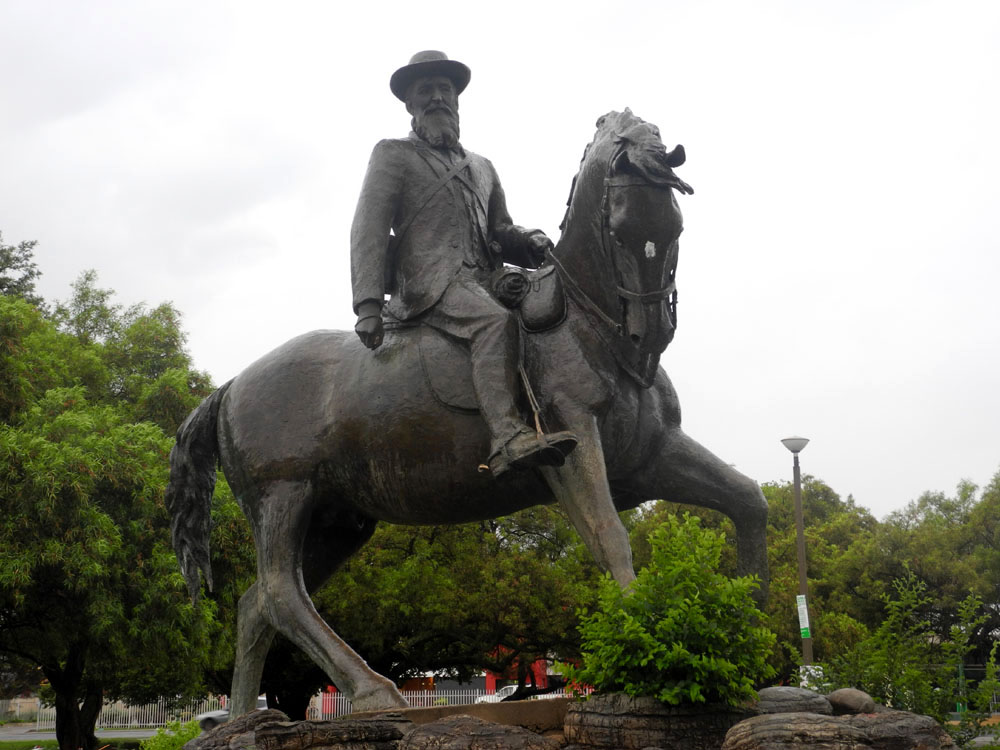
Equestrian statue of De la Rey in Lichtenburg

== In popular culture ==
Interest in the life and career of General De la Rey has made a resurgence in South Africa due to a popular Afrikaans song, De la Rey, released by folk singer Bok van Blerk in 2005. The song concerns an Orange Free State partisan facing impending defeat, the loss of his farm, and the incarceration of his family in a concentration camp during the Second Boer War. Contemplating what he feels is certain destruction for the Afrikaner people, he calls on De la Rey to lead their people to victory.

The Department of Arts and Culture responded to a request for a statement on van Blerk's potentially subversive lyrics, insisting that the song was "in danger of being hijacked by a minority of right-wingers", and warning that "those who incite treason, whatever methods they employ, might well find themselves in difficulties with the law." The Democratic Alliance opposition party has retorted that De la Rey was not nearly as potentially subversive as ANC president Jacob Zuma's song Umshini wami (Zulu for "bring me my machine [gun]").

De la Rey is an antagonist in the book Assegai (novel) by the novelist, Wilbur Smith.

== See also ==
- Regiment de la Rey
