= Jan Kemp (general) =

Military leader and politician from South Africa (1872–1946)

Jan Christoffel Greyling Kemp
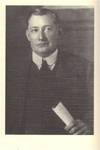
- Kemp in 1924
- Born: 10 June 1872; Amersfoort district, Transvaal
- Died: 31 December 1946 (aged 74); Piet Retief, South Africa
- Military career
- Allegiance: South African Republic; South Africa
- Rank: Combat General
- Commands: Krugersdorp Commando
- Conflicts: Magato War; Jameson Raid; Second Boer War: Battle of Pietershoogte; Battle of Nooitgedacht; Battle of Rooiwal; Battle of Tweebosch; Battle of Hart's River; World War I: Maritz rebellion
- Other work: Clerk; Farmer; Member of Parliament; Cabinet Minister

Jan Christoffel Greyling Kemp (10 June 1872 – 31 December 1946) was a South African Boer officer, rebel general, and politician.

== Early life ==
Jan Kemp was born in the present Amersfoort district, Transvaal on 10 June 1872, the younger son of Jurie Johannes Kemp and Maria Aletta Greyling. His maternal grandfather, Abraham Carel Greyling, a stepson of the Voortrekker leader, Piet Retief, was killed with Retief in 1838. His paternal grandfather, Petrus Johannes Kemp, emigrated from Belgium between 1830 and 1840.

He was educated at the Staatsgymnasium (State Gymnasium) in Pretoria.

He became a clerk in the Transvaal department of education in 1889. He soon transferred to the mining commissioner's office in Krugersdorp and achieved the position of chief clerk by 1899.

== Military career ==
He served in the Magato War, against the Basuto chief, in 1895 and helped to suppress the Jameson Raid.

At the outbreak of the Second Anglo-Boer War he joined the Krugersdorp Commando. As a burgher, he participated in many of the early engagements in Natal.

In November 1899, he was elected assistant field-cornet. On 27 February 1900 he distinguished himself at the Battle of Pietershoogte (also known as Spoorwegkop/Railway Hill) despite the Boer forces having to withdraw and the British forces taking the position.

In June 1900, while serving under General Christian Frederick Beyers in the northern Transvaal he was elected a commandant.

On 13 December 1900, at the Battle of Nooitgedacht, where he commanded one of the Boer commandos, he was wounded in the arm.

In February 1901 he was promoted to combat general and instructed to make contact with General Koos de la Rey in the western Transvaal.

It had been intended that Kemp should invade the Cape Colony. This plan was abandoned and he became one of De la Rey's ablest and most daring officers, showing his tactical acumen particularly in the actions at Vlakfontein (29–30 May 1901), Moedwil (30 September 1901) and Battle of Ysterspruit, near Klerksdorp in the Western Transvaal on 25 February 1902.

His suggestion (September 1901) that a military government should supplant the civil government of the Transvaal republic, was vetoed by De la Rey. In the Battle of Tweebos on 7 March 1902, where his horse was shot under him, he played a prominent part in capturing Lord Methuen's column. On 11 April 1902, at Roodewal, in one of the last important actions of the war, Kemp launched a recklessly brave attack in De la Rey's absence, on Major-General RG Kekewich's forces, once again using a mounted charge over open terrain, which had become his characteristic mode of attack.

Representing the Krugersdorp commando at the peace negotiations at Vereeniging, he urged the continuation of the war and was one of the minority of six who voted against the peace terms.

During World War I, Kemp participated in the Maritz rebellion. He was captured on 2 February 1915. A South African court found him guilty of treason and sentenced him to 7 years in prison. However, he was released after serving only 10 months, on condition of not participating in politics. Kemp broke this promise by joining the National Party in 1920.

== Personal life ==
On 10 June 1903 he married Anna Emma Bodenstein, the daughter of a former landdrost of Krugersdorp, JC Bodenstein and his wife, MC Combrink. They had two daughters and a son.

His wife died in March 1941 and his already failing health deteriorated rapidly. Despite this he remained active in parliament.

He published two volumes of memoirs, the first, published in 1941, dealt with events before 1902 and the second, published in 1942, covered the subsequent period.

He died at Piet Retief, Transvaal, on 31 December 1946.

== Legacy ==
- The town of Jan Kempdorp in the Northern Cape Province is named after Kemp.
- When, as Minister of Lands, Kemp, was asked in 1936 to set aside a special reserve for the endangered Cape mountain zebra, he gave his now infamous reply: "No! They're just a lot of donkeys in football jerseys." Fortunately for the species, he was persuaded otherwise, and the Mountain Zebra National Park at Cradock, Eastern Cape was established in 1938.
- A Union Defence Force era regiment on the east rand was named in his honour. Regiment Kemp was eventually amalgamated into Regiment Oos Rand.

== Memoirs ==
Vir Vryheid En Vir Reg – Generaal J.C.G. Kemp. 1941 NASIONALE PERS

- English translation: "For Freedom & Justice". Anglo-Boer War memoir of one of the ablest Boer Generals (1st of 2 volumes – this vol. ends with the Peace of Vereeniging).

Die Pad Van Die Veroweraar – Generaal J.C.G. Kemp. 1942 NASIONALE PERS

- English translation: "The Road of the Conqueror". Anglo-Boer War memoir of one of the ablest Boer Generals (2nd of 2 volumes – this vol. starts with the Peace of Vereeniging, covers the 1914 rebellion and ends with Kemp as cabinet minister).
