= Christiaan Frederik Beyers =

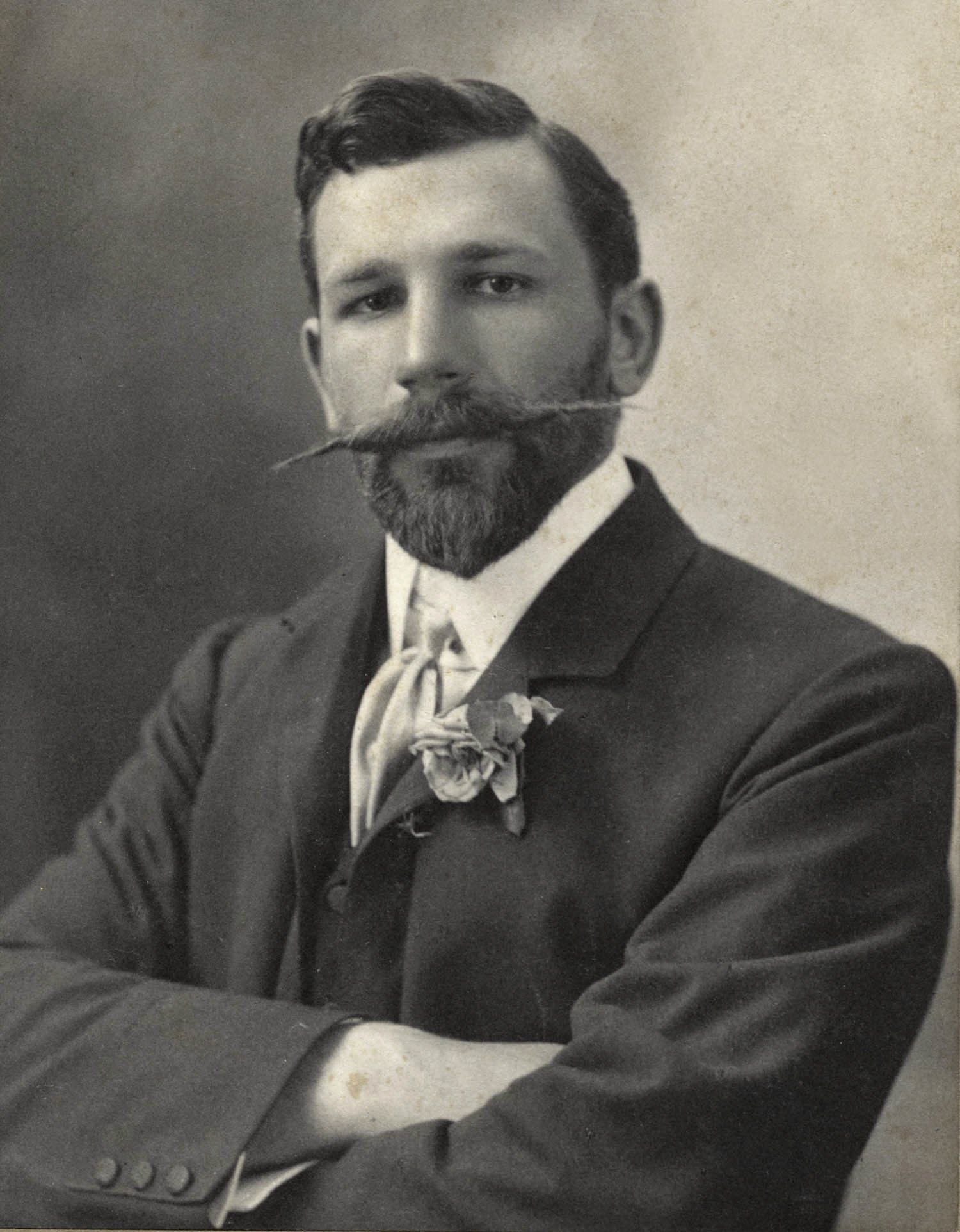
- Beyers around 1899
- Born: 23 September 1869; Stellenbosch, Cape Colony^{[a]}
- Died: 8 December 1914 (aged 45); Vaal River near Makwassie, Transvaal,^{[b]} South Africa
- Cause of death: Drowning
- Spouse: Mathilde König
- Military career
- Allegiance: Cape Colony; South African Republic; Transvaal Colony; Union of South Africa
- Rank: General
- Commands: Waterberg and Zoutpansberg Commandos
- Conflicts: Jameson Raid; Second Boer War; World War I; Maritz Rebellion †
- a. Now the Western Cape, South Africa; b. Now the North West

Christiaan Frederik Beyers (23 September 1869 – 8 December 1914) was a Boer attorney, politician and general during the Second Boer War and one of the leaders of the pro-German Maritz rebellion (1914 – 1915) against the government of the Union of South Africa.

== Biography ==
Beyers was born on his family farm Banhoek near Stellenbosch, Cape Colony. He graduated there at Victoria College as an attorney in 1889.

=== Transvaal attorney and Boer War general ===
Shortly afterwards he migrated to Pretoria in the South African Republic (Transvaal), where he passed his legal procureur exam in 1894. He then settled in Boksburg starting a legal practice with his friends König and Malherbe. He married his legal partner's sister Mathilde König. As a sportsman, he played for the Transvaal Rugby Team against the first British Lions. In 1896, he was part of the commando which stopped the Jameson Raid. In recognition, he was awarded the Transvaal right to vote.

After the outbreak of the Second Boer War, he entrained with the Boksburg Commando for the Colony of Natal. Following his good performance at the Battle of Diamond Hill (Donkerhoek, 11–12 June 1900) and Battle of Dalmanutha (21–27 August 1900) he was promoted to Assistant Commandant General of the Waterberg and Zoutpansberg Commandos. As a general he joined forces with Jan Smuts and Koos de la Rey and his Commandos played a major role at the Battle of Nooitgedacht (13 December 1900). Heavy skirmishes ensued in the Magaliesberg and all over the Northern Transvaal.

Beyers had gained much prestige as a soldier and a statesman among the Afrikaners, and was recognized as one of the leaders of the Transvaal Boers, though with slightly less standing than generals Botha and Smuts. In the negotiations leading to the peace Treaty of Vereeniging (31 May 1902), he was elected Chairman of the Boer Delegates.

=== Politician and Union general ===
When responsible government was granted to the Transvaal Colony in 1907, Beyers became speaker of the Lower House. He showed in the speaker's chair remarkable gifts. He made a deep impression upon English-speaking South Africans, who would have supported his claims to be the first speaker of the first Union of South Africa House of Assembly, had they been pressed by Louis Botha, the first Prime Minister. Instead, Beyers was made commandant general of the Citizen Forces of the Union Defence Force of South Africa, and in that capacity paid a visit to Great Britain, Germany, Switzerland and the Netherlands in 1912.

=== Opponent in First World War ===
According to the 1922 Encyclopedia Britannica, Beyers was described as “a man of fine physique, of passionate nature, and of profound religious convictions.” During his tenure as commandant-general of South Africa, he visited Germany, where he was received by Kaiser Wilhelm II.

When World War I broke out, he set himself in almost open opposition to the policy of the First Cabinet of Louis Botha of the Union of South Africa. When the South African expeditionary force was being mobilized for the invasion of German South-West Africa, with rebellion was smouldering among the irreconcilables of the South African Dutch, Beyers resigned his post as commandant general in a letter addressed to General Smuts, then Minister of Defence, and published in Het Volk, an anti-government journal. In this letter he declared that he had always disapproved the Government's intention to invade German South-West Africa and that this disapproval was shared by the great majority of the Dutch-speaking people of the Union. General Smuts replied in a stern letter stating that the war was a test of the loyalty to their pledged word of the Dutch-speaking people, and accepted Beyers' resignation. Beyers was a friend of the pastor Jozua Naudé who named his son C.F. Beyers Naudé after him.

==== Maritz Rebellion ====
A few weeks later, Beyers took the field as one of the Maritz rebellion, but General Botha's troops forced Beyers and his men to flee. Wounded, he drowned on 8 December 1914, while trying to escape from his pursuers by crossing the flooded Vaal River near Makwassie. His body was recovered two days later. In Beyers' pocket were found his prayer book “Worship God” written by the Reverend Andrew Murray, spectacles, cartridges for his Boer War Mauser pistol, and an important document on the rebellion. As the government did not allow Beyers' funeral in Pretoria, he was quietly buried in Makwassie.

The South African linguist and writer S.P.E. Boshoff later devoted two Afrikaans books to Beyers and his leadership in the Maritz rebellion: 'Vaalrivier die Broederstroom', of die uiteinde van Generaal C.F. Beyers, 1917, and Rebellie - Sketse uit mij dagboek, 1914-1915, 1918.

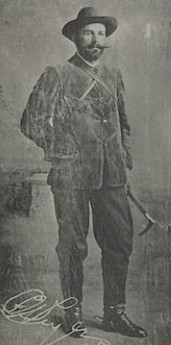
Beyers shortly after the Boer War, so in 1902.

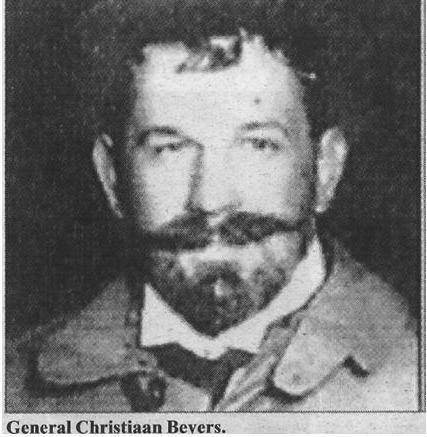
Beyers in 1914.

== Literature ==
- A.E., Onze Krijgs-officieren. Album van portretten met levens-schetsen der Transvaalse Generaals en Kommandanten (Translated title: Our Military Officers. Album of portraits with life sketches of the Transvaal Generals and Commandants), Volksstem, Pretoria 1904. In Dutch with a preface by Louis Botha. PDF on Wikimedia Commons. Page 39.
- Chisholm, Hugh, ed. (1922). "Beyers, Christian Frederick" . Encyclopædia Britannica. Vol. 30 (12th ed.). London & New York: The Encyclopædia Britannica Company. p. 455.
- Pakenham, Thomas (1979). The Boer War. London: Weidenfeld & Nicolson. ISBN 029777395X. OCLC 905293995. pp. 477–480.
