= Gary Lockwood =

American actor (born 1937)

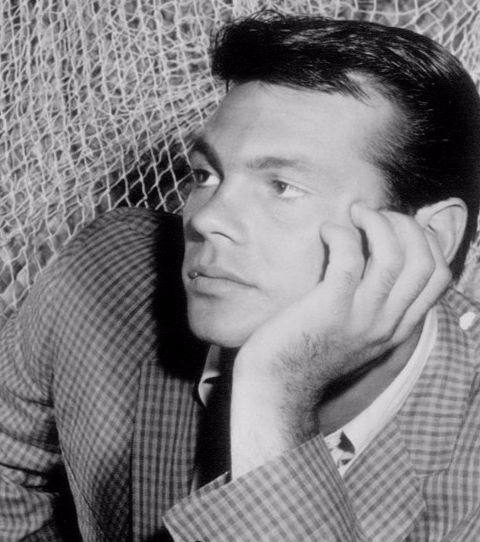
- Lockwood in 1962
- Born: John Gary Yurosek; February 21, 1937 (age 89); Los Angeles, California
- Education: UCLA
- Occupation: Actor
- Years active: 1958–2004; 2024
- Spouses: Stefanie Powers (m. 1966; div. 1972) Denise DuBarry (m. 1982; div. 1988)
- Children: 1
- Relatives: Mike Yurosek (uncle)

Gary Lockwood (born John Gary Yurosek; February 21, 1937) is an American actor. Lockwood is best known for his roles as astronaut Frank Poole in the film 2001: A Space Odyssey (1968), and as Lieutenant Commander Gary Mitchell in the Star Trek second pilot episode "Where No Man Has Gone Before" (1966). He starred in the only American film by French New Wave director Jacques Demy, Model Shop. He played numerous guest television roles from the early 1960s into the mid-1990s, and played the title role in The Lieutenant (1963–1964).

== Early life ==
Lockwood was born in Van Nuys, California as John Gary Yurosek of partial Polish descent. His uncle, Mike Yurosek, is credited with creating baby-cut carrots. Lockwood was a one-year letterman for legendary football coach Red Sanders in 1956 and is listed as Gary Yurosek in official UCLA Athletics records.

== Career ==
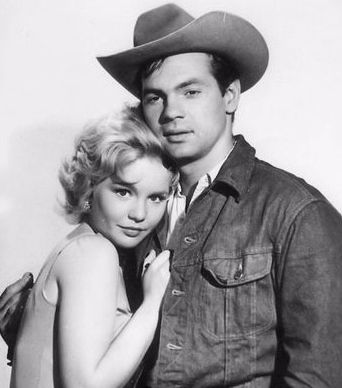
Lockwood and Tuesday Weld in Bus Stop (1961)

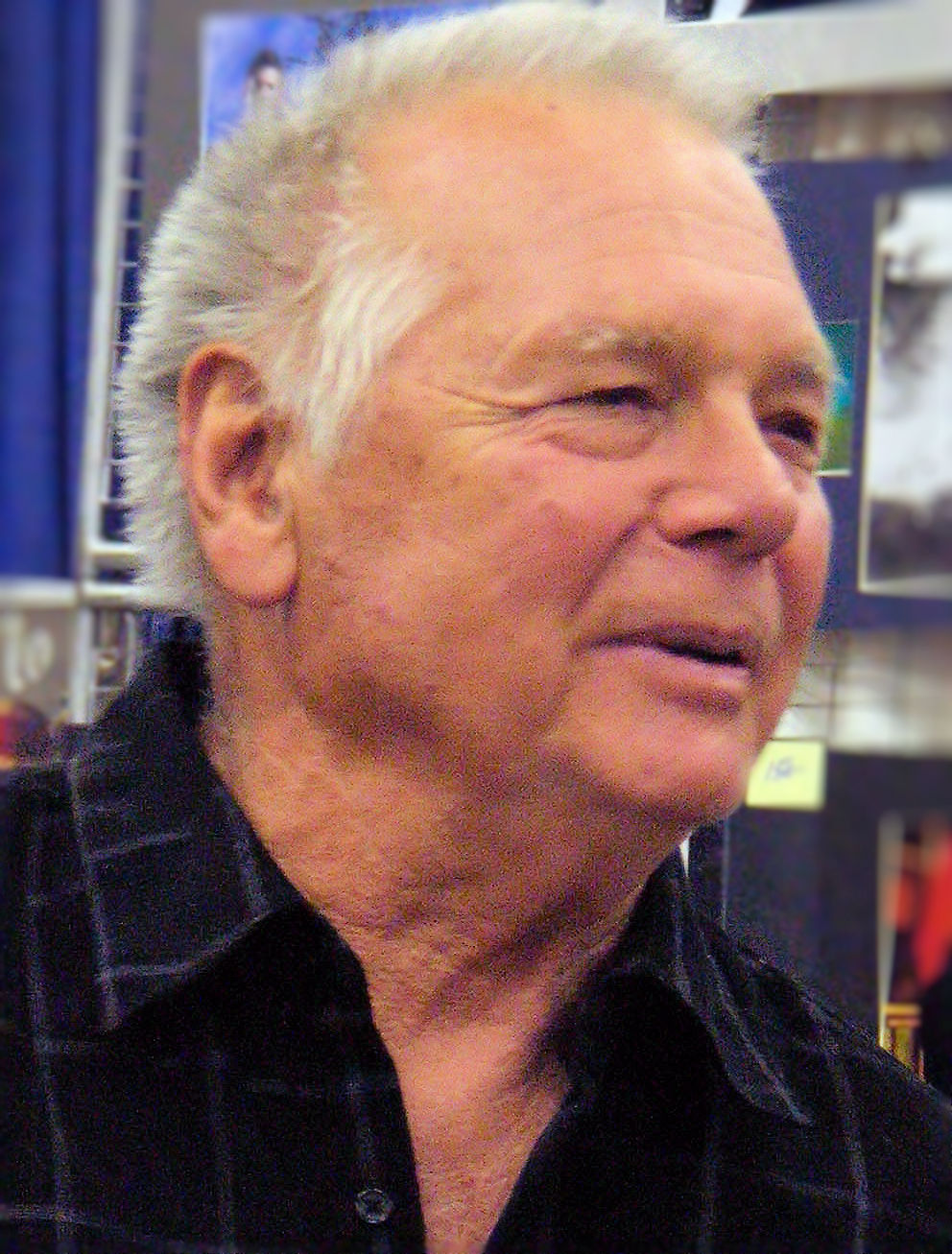
Lockwood at WonderCon (2009)

Lockwood was a film stuntman, and a stand-in for Anthony Perkins prior to his acting debut in 1959 in an uncredited bit role in Warlock.

Lockwood's two series came early in his career, and each lasted only a single season. ABC's Hawaii-set Follow the Sun (1961–62) cast him in support of Brett Halsey and Barry Coe, who played adventurous magazine writers based in Honolulu. Lockwood was Eric Jason, who did the legwork for their articles. He appeared in a supporting role in the film Splendor in the Grass (1961) and in ABC's TV series Bus Stop (1961). The 26-week series, which starred Marilyn Maxwell as the owner of a diner in fictitious Sunrise, Colorado, aired a half-hour after Follow the Sun.

In his film debut, he appeared with Tuesday Weld in Wild in the Country (1961), starring Elvis Presley. Thereafter, Lockwood starred with Jeff Bridges in the acclaimed "My Daddy Can Beat Your Daddy" episode of The Lloyd Bridges Show. In 1959, he had an uncredited role as a police officer in the Perry Mason episode "The Case of the Romantic Rogue". His first lead role came in 1961's The Magic Sword, written and directed by Bert I. Gordon. In 1962, Lockwood again appeared on Perry Mason in the lead role in "The Case of the Playboy Pugilist". In 1963, Lockwood co-starred with Elvis Presley in the musical-comedy film It Happened at the World's Fair.

In 1963 and 1964, Lockwood starred as a young U.S. Marine second lieutenant named William T. ("Bill") Rice in the NBC series The Lieutenant. This drama, about the peacetime Marines, was produced by the creators of Star Trek (Gene Roddenberry) and The Man from U.N.C.L.E. (Norman Felton). The series co-starred Robert Vaughn as Lieutenant Rice's immediate superior, Captain Raymond Rambridge. Despite moderately good reviews for The Lieutenant, its scheduling opposite CBS's popular Jackie Gleason's American Scene Magazine contributed to it being cancelled after 29 episodes.

In 1964, Lockwood guest-starred as Major Gus Denver in the first season of 12 O'Clock High, in episode 9, "Appointment at Liege", and again in 1965 in episode 29, "V For Vendetta". He also guest-starred as Lt. Josh McGraw in season 2, episode 4, "The Idolator" of 12 O'Clock High. Shortly afterward, Lockwood starred in another NBC television series The Kraft Mystery Theater (also known as Crisis) in an episode titled "Connery's Hands". He was cast opposite Sally Kellerman, with whom he would soon appear again as helmsman Gary Mitchell in the second Star Trek pilot, "Where No Man Has Gone Before" (1965), in which their characters develop malignant super powers.

In 1966, he starred as murderous bank-robbing cowboy Jim Stark in a rare two-part episode of Gunsmoke called "The Raid", along with John Anderson, Michael Conrad, Jim Davis, and Richard Jaeckel.

He may be best known on the big screen for his co-starring role in Stanley Kubrick's 2001: A Space Odyssey (1968) as Dr. Frank Poole. Lockwood was the lead in Model Shop (1969), the American debut by French writer-director Jacques Demy. He starred with Elke Sommer in the crime drama They Came to Rob Las Vegas (1968) and with Jacqueline Bisset in the comedy Stand Up and Be Counted (1972).

Lockwood co-starred with Stefanie Powers (then his wife) in an episode of ABC's Love, American Style as a newlywed who gets his mouth stuck around a doorknob. In 1983, he guest-starred in the series Hart to Hart ("Emily by Hart") with Robert Wagner and Powers, by then his ex-wife. Between 1959 and 2004, Lockwood gained roles in some 40 theatrical features and made-for-TV movies and 80 TV guest appearances, including the CBS 1975 family drama Three for the Road and Barnaby Jones starring Buddy Ebsen, in which he appeared many times as a villain.

In 2024, Lockwood again portrayed Gary Mitchell in OTOY's short film 765874 – Unification, which used digital technology to simulate his appearance in 1966.

== Personal life ==
Lockwood has been married twice. His first marriage was in 1966 to actress Stefanie Powers. The couple divorced in 1972. In 1982, Lockwood married actress and businesswoman Denise DuBarry, with whom he has a daughter, Samantha DuBarry-Lockwood (b. 1982).

== TV and filmography ==
- Onionhead (1958) as Sergeant Seated at Bar (uncredited)
- Death Valley Days (1959, TV series) as Soldier (uncredited)
- Warlock (1959) as Gang Member (uncredited)
- Bronco (1959, TV series) as Johnny Evans (credited as Gary Yurosek)
- Perry Mason (1959–1962, TV series) as Davey Carroll / Young Policeman
- Tall Story (1960) as Russian Basketball Player (uncredited)
- Wild in the Country (1961) as Cliff Macy
- Splendor in the Grass (1961) as Allen 'Toots' Tuttle
- Bus Stop (1961, TV series) as Bo
- Follow the Sun (1961–1962) as Eric Jason
- The Magic Sword (1962) as Sir George
- Saints and Sinners (1962, TV series) as Vinnie
- The Lloyd Bridges Show (1963, TV series) as Kid Devlin
- It Happened at the World's Fair (1963) as Danny Burke
- The Lieutenant (1963–1964, TV series) as Lieutenant Rice
- Combat! (1964, TV series) as Sgt. Meider
- Kitten with a Whip (1964) as Minor Role (uncredited)
- 12 O'Clock High (1964–1965, TV series) as Maj. Gus Denver / Lt. Josh McGraw
- Kraft Suspense Theatre (1965, TV series) as Frank Connery
- Sally and Sam (1965, TV movie) as Sam Cody
- Seaway (1965, TV series) as Jed Garth
- The Legend of Jesse James (1966, TV series) as Clint Bethard
- The Long, Hot Summer (1966, TV series) as Danny Hamil
- Gunsmoke (1966, TV series) as “Jim Stark”
- Star Trek: The Original Series (1966) as Lt. Cmdr. Gary Mitchell in S1:E3, "Where No Man Has Gone Before"
- Firecreek (1968) as Earl
- 2001: A Space Odyssey (1968) as Dr. Frank Poole
- They Came to Rob Las Vegas (1968) as Tony Ferris
- Model Shop (1969) as George Matthews
- Love, American Style (1969, TV series) as Ernie
- R. P. M. (1970) as Rossiter
- Medical Center (1970-1973) as Dr. Carl Webson / Lorenz
- The Young Rebels (1971, TV series) as John Benton
- The Young Lawyers (1971, TV series) as Billy Walden
- Earth II (1971, TV movie) as David Seville
- Stand Up and Be Counted (1972) as Eliot Travis
- Night Gallery (1972, TV series) as James Figg
- Mission: Impossible (1973, TV series) as Nicholas Varsi
- Banacek (1973, TV series) as Owen Russell
- Barnaby Jones (1973-1979) 6 episodes throughout series
- The F.B.I. (1974, TV series) as Ben Sillman
- The Manhunter (1974, TV series) as Frank Clinger
- Ironside (1974, TV series) as Det. Sgt. Jim Marshall
- The F.B.I. Story: The F.B.I. Versus Alvin Karpis, Public Enemy Number One (1974, TV movie) as Fred Barker
- Movin' On (1974, TV series) as Officer Mike Harmony
- The Six Million Dollar Man "Eyewitness to Murder" (1974–1975, TV series) as Hopper / John Hopper
- Three for the Road (1975, TV series) as Brent Aberling
- Cannon (1975, TV series) "Coffin Corner" as Richard Halsey
- Cannon (1976, TV series) "Cry Wolf" as Mark Terrence
- Project Kill (1976) as Frank Lassiter
- The Blue Knight (1976, TV series) as Officer Macy
- The Quest (1976, TV series, a short-lived NBC western) as Walter Lucas
- Police Story (1976, TV series) "Trash Detail, Front and Center" as Marty Costa
- The Streets of San Francisco (1977, TV series) as Charley Belasco
- Walt Disney's Wonderful World of Color in 2-part episode, "Kit Carson and the Mountain Men" (1977, TV series) as Bret Haskell
- Hunter (1977, TV series) as John DeLacey
- The Bionic Woman (1977) as Lyle Cannon
- Bad Georgia Road (1977) as Leroy Hastings
- Police Story (1977, TV series) "End of the Line" as J.A. "Red" Avery
- Starsky & Hutch (1978, TV series) as Jimmy Spenser
- The Ghost of Flight 401 (1978, TV movie) as Jordan Evanhower
- The Incredible Journey of Doctor Meg Laurel (1979, TV movie) as Harley Moon
- Top of the Hill (1980, TV movie) as Dave Cully
- Hawaii Five-O (1980, TV series) as Kelsey in S12:E12, "School for Assassins"
- Vega$ (1980, TV series) as District Attorney Edward St. John
- Charlie's Angels (1980, TV series) as Claude
- Trapper John, M.D. (1980-1986) as Augie / Dr. Matthew Ashfield
- The Girl, the Gold Watch & Dynamite (1981, TV movie) as Sheriff Earl Baker
- The Fall Guy (1982-1984) as Navy Officer / LaRue
- Matt Houston (1982-1984) as Dr. Owen Denny / Sheriff
- Hart to Hart (1983, TV series) as Alex Carmen
- Survival Zone (1983) as Ben Faber
- Emergency Room (1983, TV movie) as Dr. David Becker
- Cover Up (1984, TV series) as Allan Crossland
- T.J. Hooker (1984-1985) as DEA Agent Twill / Sgt. Carey Dunston
- Simon & Simon (1984–1986) as Dr. Maynard Ellis / Exec. Prod. Ron Redding / Daniel C. Thacker / Eddie Blair / Air Force Col. Christopher J. Ahern
- Finder of Lost Loves (1985, TV series) as Stan Gallagher
- Murder, She Wrote (1985–1994) as Sam Mercer / Sheriff Deloy Hays / Tom Carpenter / Harris Talmadge
- Scarecrow and Mrs. King (1986, TV series) as Dr. Drew Goldberg
- The Return of the Six Million Dollar Man and the Bionic Woman (1987, TV movie) as John Praiser
- Hotel (1987, TV series) as Ben Stone
- The Wild Pair (1987) as Captain Kramer
- MacGyver (1988, TV series) as Grant
- Superboy (1989, TV series) as Dexter Linton
- Terror in Paradise (1991) as Major Douglas
- Night of the Scarecrow (1995) as Mayor William Goodman
- A Bedfull of Foreigners (1996) as Dieter Dieterman
- Dark Skies (1997) as Earl Warren
- 765874 - Unification (2024) as Gary Mitchell
