= Foster gang =

Criminal group in South Africa in 1914

The Foster gang was a group of criminals who operated in South Africa, around Johannesburg and the Rand, between the months of July and September 1914, committing various acts of robbery and murder. The gang consisted of four persons : the leader William Henry Foster, his wife Peggy Foster, John Maxim and Carl Mezar. After a standoff with the police, the gang members and Foster's wife all committed suicide.

== History ==
The gang formed in 1914, a few months after William Foster had escaped from Pretoria Prison, where he had been sentenced to 12 years hard labour for robbing a shop. Their first robbery was at the Boksburg North branch of the National Bank. When the gang began breaking into the bank, they were startled by a clerk who was sleeping on the premises. Carl Mezar instantly attacked the man sleeping on the floor and a brawl began. The clerk managed to escape and ran towards a nearby hotel on the other side of the street, shouting for help. This drew the attention of a barman named Alex Charlson. When Charlson tried to intervene, he was shot in the chest and later died. The entire robbery had been an abundance of disasters.

A few weeks later, the gang robbed the Roodepoort Post Office. This was followed by a second post office robbery, this time at Vredendorp. Then, on Sunday 13 September, at a Big Bottle Store in Doornfontein, a sequence of events began which ultimately was to lead to nine deaths and the most intensive manhunt the South African Police had ever conducted.

A manhunt was set to find the three men. A local woman informed the police that she believed that they were living in a small cottage near her house, and three plain-clothes officers were sent to investigate. Detective Mynott, who was in charge, approached the backyard. He spotted the gang working on a motorcar in the backyard and instead of waiting for assistance to arrive, Mynott decided to arrest the gang himself. Mynott was shot dead by William Foster, this resulted in a bigger manhunt to find the three criminals. While road blocks were being set up to stop the gang in their tracks, they had already taken refuge in a cave that Foster had known as a boy. Police had sent sniffer dogs out to try locate the three men, and they were soon led to the cave where the three men were hiding.

Soon the cave was surrounded by police, but before they would surrender William Foster asked to speak to his wife Peggy and his child. Once his wife had arrived, William informed her that he was going to commit suicide along with the other men, and she told him that she was going to do the same. A few minutes later three shots were heard and the Foster Gang saga had ended.

== Significance ==
The gang is historically significant because a nominated senator, General Koos de la Rey, was shot by a policeman at a road block set up to look for the Foster gang. De la Rey's death and subsequent funeral, where it was rumoured that he had been assassinated by the government, was a contributory factor in the Maritz Rebellion of 1914.

== In popular culture ==
A South African feature film on the Foster Gang, entitled The Foster Gang produced and directed by Percival Rubens, was released in 1964. A copy of the film is preserved at the South African National Film, Video and Sound Archives.

A more recent production is a 2001 docudrama also titled The Foster Gang. It was directed by Cedric Sundstrom, and the cast includes Christopher Beasley as William Foster, Tracy Lee Cundill as Peggy Foster, Shane Steenkamp as John Maxim and Brian Webber as Carl Mezar.
