= Sparv =

Sparv is a Swedish surname. Notable people with the surname include:

- Camilla Sparv (born 1943), Swedish actress
- Tim Sparv (born 1987), Finnish footballer
