= Ben Yurosek =

American football player (born 2002)

No. 85 – Minnesota Vikings
- Position: Tight end
- Roster status: Active

Personal information
- Born: March 17, 2002 (age 24); Bakersfield, California, U.S.
- Listed height: 6 ft 4 in (1.93 m)
- Listed weight: 251 lb (114 kg)

Career information
- High school: Bakersfield Christian (Bakersfield, California)
- College: Stanford (2020–2023); Georgia (2024)
- NFL draft: 2025: undrafted

Career history
- Minnesota Vikings (2025–present)

Awards and highlights
- Second-team All-Pac-12 (2022)

Career NFL statistics as of Week 10, 2026
- Receptions: 5
- Receiving yards: 55
- Stats at Pro Football Reference

Benjamin Yurosek (born March 17, 2002) is an American professional football tight end for the Minnesota Vikings of the National Football League (NFL). He played college football for the Stanford Cardinal and Georgia Bulldogs.

== Early life ==
Yurosek grew up in Bakersfield, California and attended Bakersfield Christian High School. He is the great-grandson of Mike Yurosek, a farmer who invented the baby carrot. As a senior he had 49 receptions for 741 yards and 11 touchdowns on offense and made 81 tackles with 22 sacks and five forced fumbles as a defensive end. He also led Bakersfield Christian to a state championship in basketball. Yurosek was rated a three-star recruit and committed to play college football at Stanford over offers from Notre Dame, Washington, and UCLA.

== College career ==
As a freshman, Yurosek played in all six of Stanford's games in the team's COVID-19-shortened 2020 season but did not catch a pass. As a sophomore, he caught 43 passes for 658 yards and three touchdowns. Yurosek was named preseason All-Pac-12 Conference and on the watchlist for the Mackey Award entering his junior season.

After the 2023 season, Yurosek entered the transfer portal prior to committing to Georgia on February 9, 2024.

== Professional career ==
Pre-draft measurables
Height	Weight	Arm length	Hand span	Wingspan	40-yard dash	10-yard split	20-yard split	20-yard shuttle	Three-cone drill	Vertical jump	Broad jump
6 ft 4 1/4 in (1.94 m)	245 lb (111 kg)	33 in (0.84 m)	9 3/8 in (0.24 m)	6 ft 7 7/8 in (2.03 m)	4.65 s	1.58 s	2.70 s	4.39 s	7.16 s	31.5 in (0.80 m)	9 ft 7 in (2.92 m)
All values from Pro Day

Yurosek signed with the Minnesota Vikings as an undrafted free agent on April 26, 2025. He made the team's initial 53-man roster on August 26, becoming one of the seven undrafted free agents that made the Vikings' roster. Yurosek's first catch as a pro came in a Week 8 contest against the Los Angeles Chargers for five yards. Yurosek finished his rookie season with two catches for 14 yards.

On September 8, 2026, Yurosek was placed on the Vikings' injured reserve list due to an ankle injury. On October 10, he was activated from injured reserve list.
