= Snowman =

Figure sculpted from snow

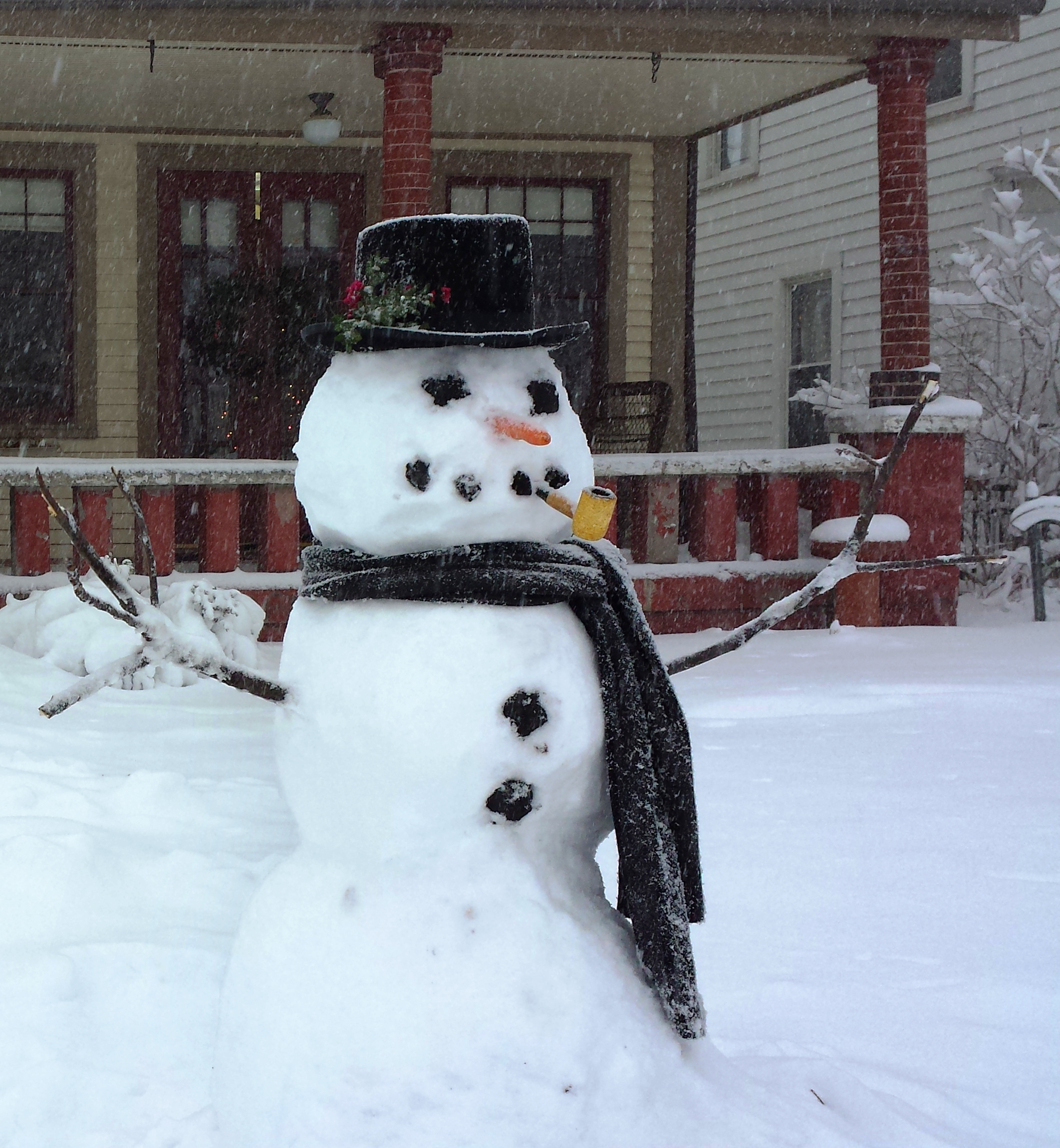
A classic three-ball snowman in Winona Lake, Indiana

Making snowman in Kõrvemaa, Estonia (January 2022)

A snowman is an anthropomorphic snow sculpture often built in regions with sufficient snowfall and is a very common winter tradition. In many places, typical snowmen consist of three large snowballs of different sizes with some additional accoutrements for facial and other features. Due to the sculptability of snow, there is also a wide variety of other styles. Common accessories include branches for arms and a smiling face made of stones, with a carrot used for a nose. Clothing, such as a hat or scarf, may be included.

== Construction ==
Snow becomes most suitable for packing when it approaches its melting point and becomes moist and compact. Making a snowman of powdered snow is difficult since it will not stick to itself, and if the temperature of packing snow drops, it will form an unusable denser form of powdered snow called the crust. Thus, a good time to build a snowman may be the next warm afternoon directly following a snowfall with a sufficient amount of snow. Using more compact snow allows for the construction of a large snowball by simply rolling it until it grows to the desired size. If the snowball reaches the bottom of the snow layer it may pick up traces of grass, gravel, or dirt.

In North America, snowmen are generally built with three spheres representing the head, torso, and lower body. In the United Kingdom, two spheres are used, one sphere representing the body and one representing the head. The usual practice is to then decorate and optionally dress the snowman. Sticks can be used for arms, and a face is traditionally made with stones or coal for eyes and a carrot for a nose. Some like to dress their snowmen in a scarf, dress, or a top hat, while others prefer not to risk leaving supplies outdoors where they could easily be stolen or become stuck under melting ice.

There are variations to these standard forms; for instance, the popular song "Frosty the Snowman" describes a snowman being decorated with a corncob pipe, button nose, two coal eyes, and an old silk hat (usually depicted as a top hat). These other types range from snow columns to elaborate snow sculptures similar to ice sculptures.

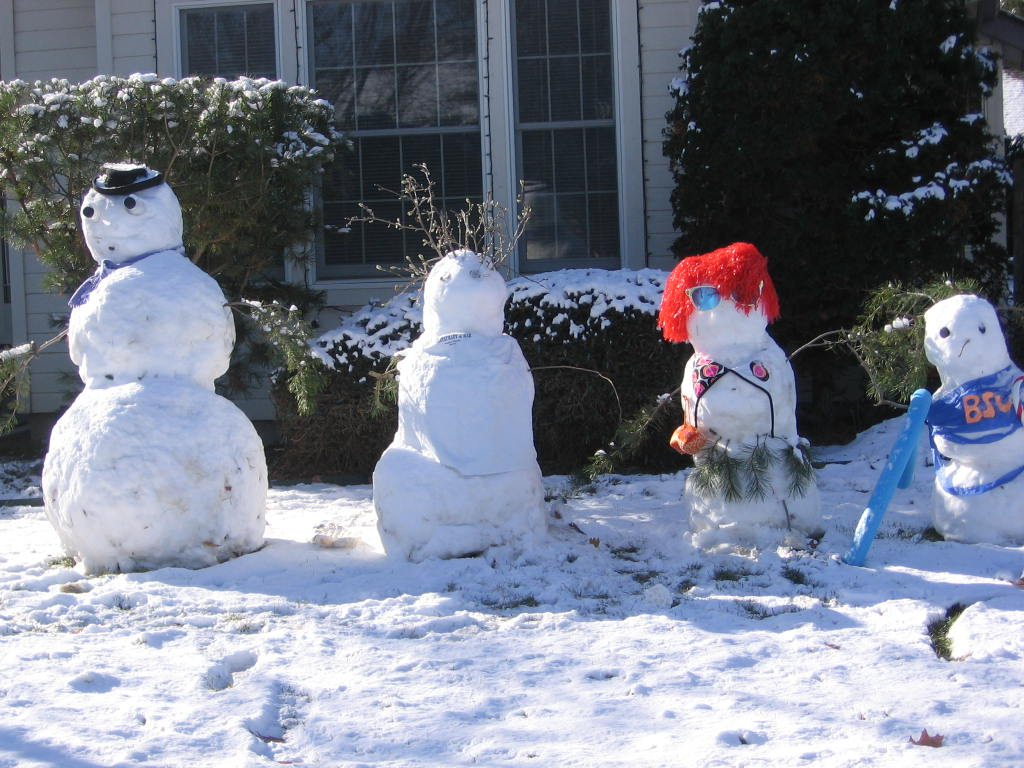
A "snow family" in Boise, Idaho, with various accessories

Snowman in Frankfurt, Germany

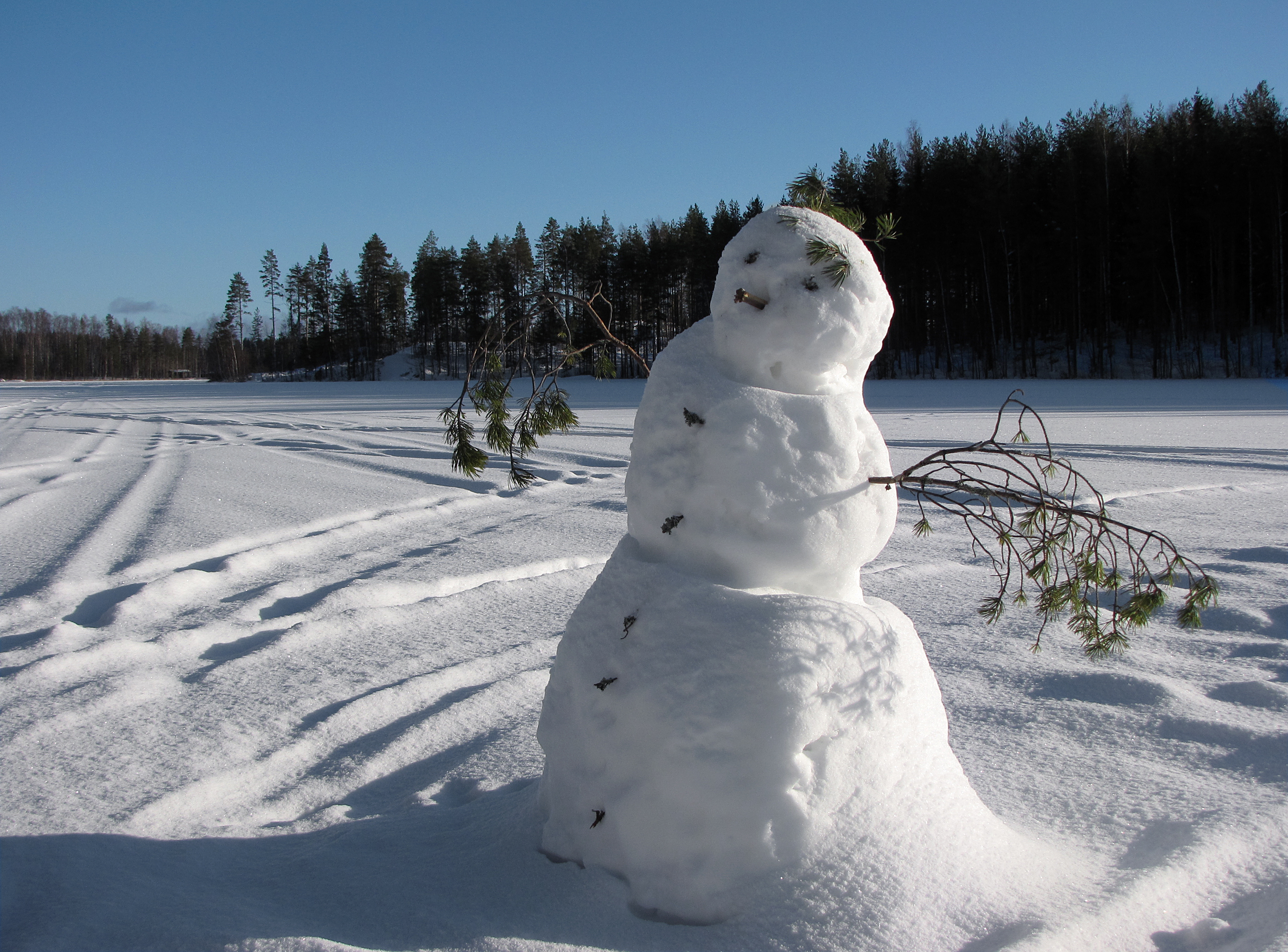
Snowman on a frozen Lake Saimaa in Puumala, South Savo, Finland

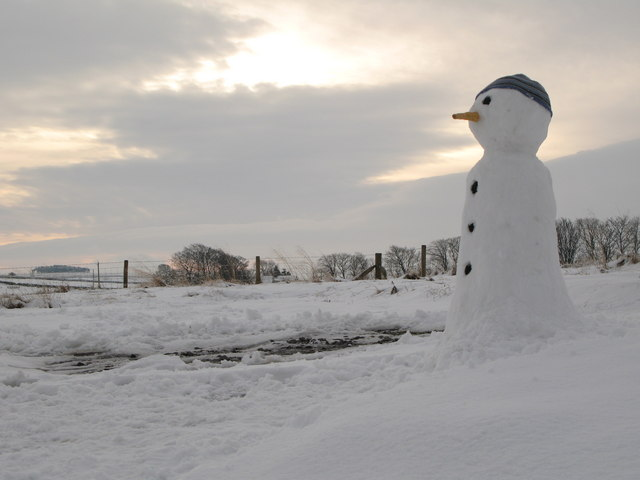
A snowman in Allendale, Northumberland, United Kingdom

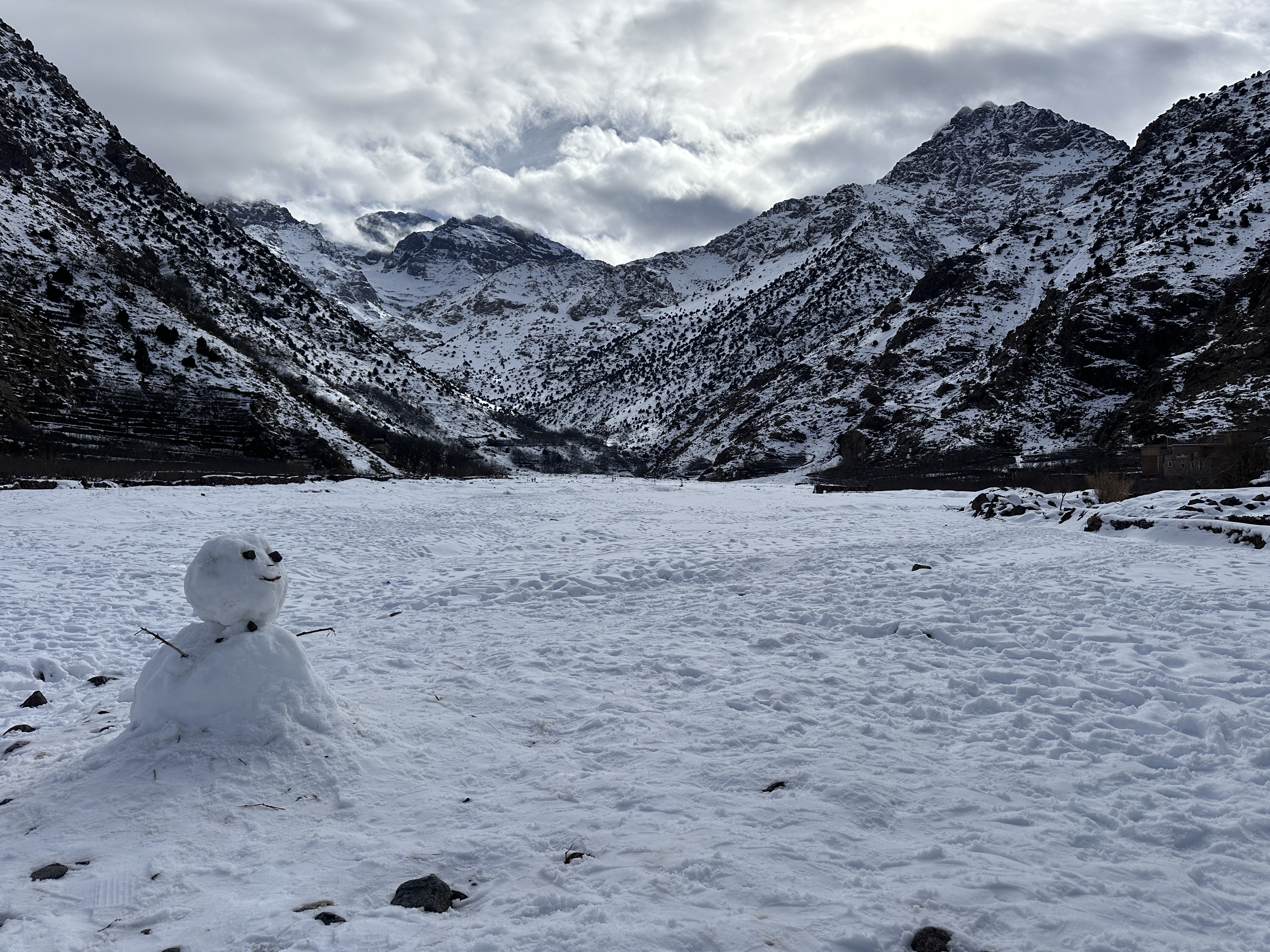
A snowman built by local children in the High Atlas Mountains of Morocco

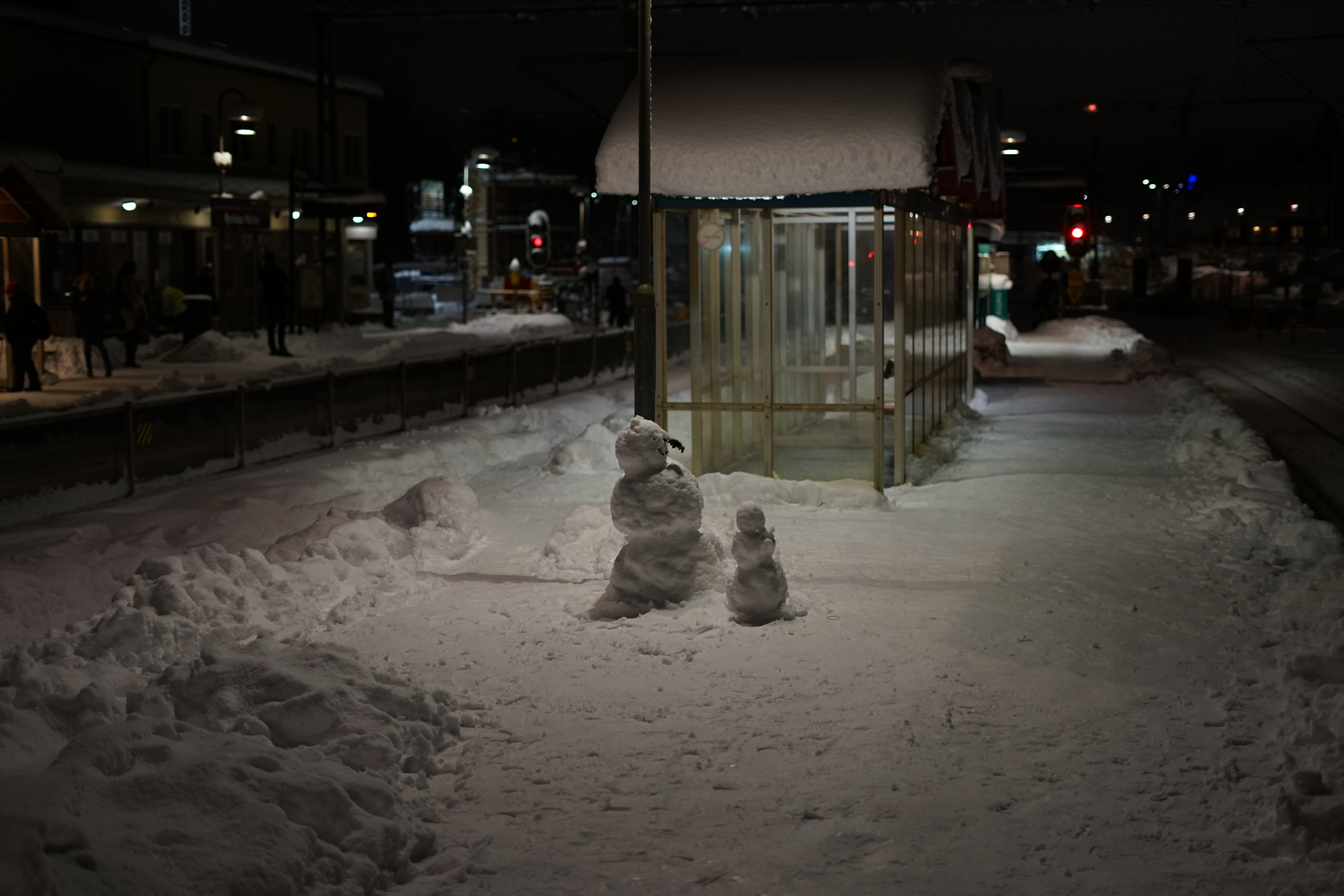
Two small snowmen on a train station in Täby, Sweden

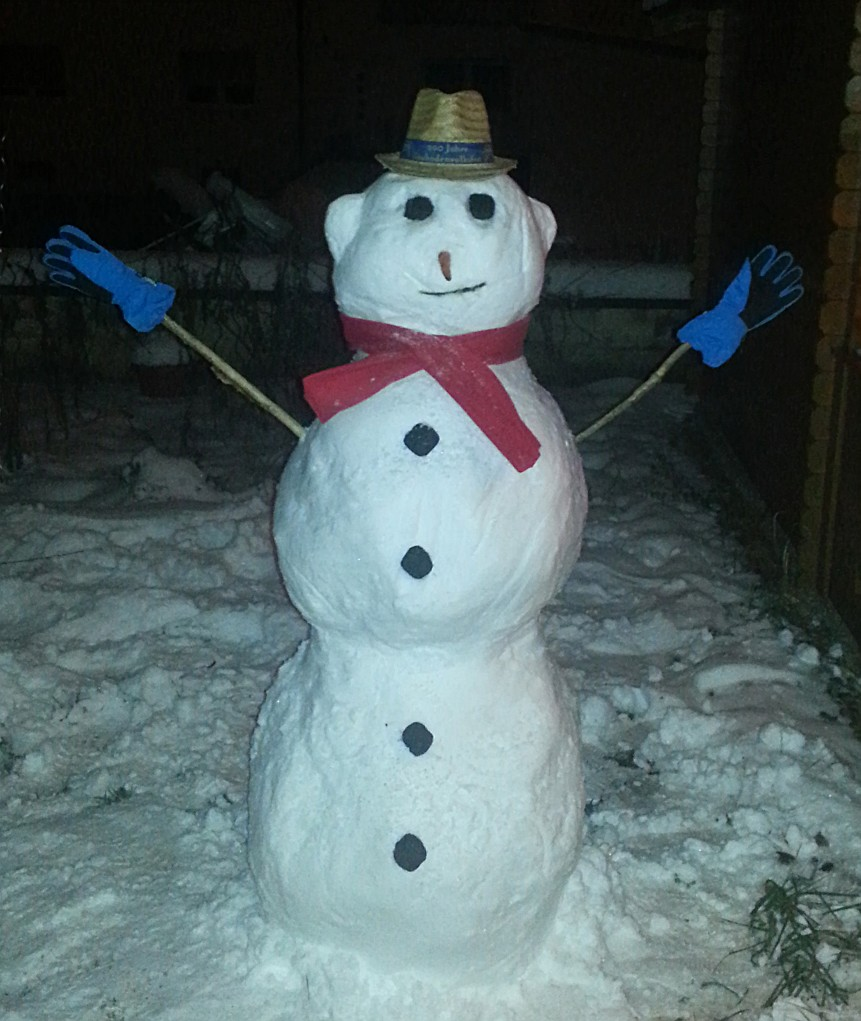
Snowman with hat, scarf, and winter gloves in Germany

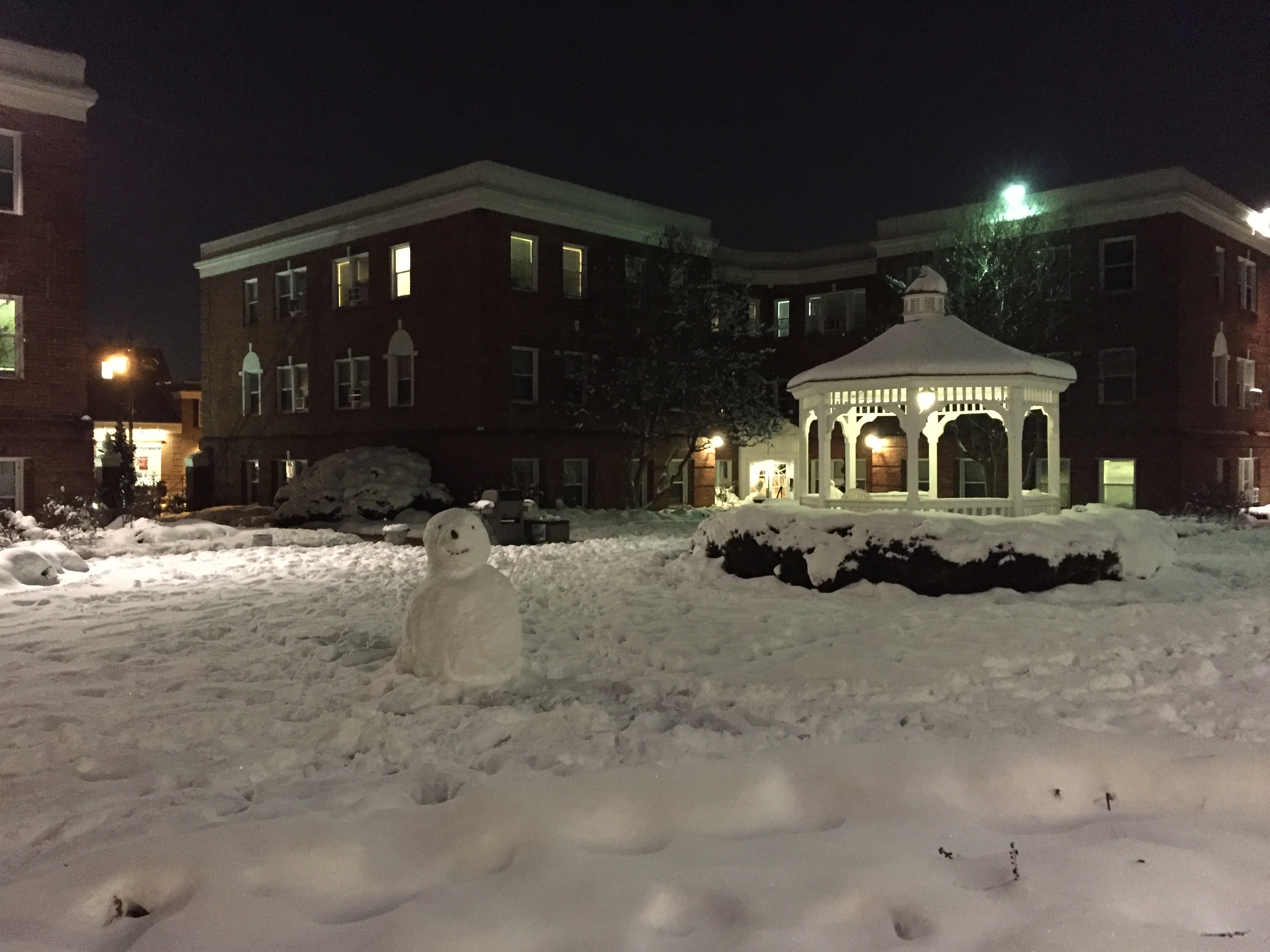
Snowman in an apartment courtyard at night in Virginia, United States

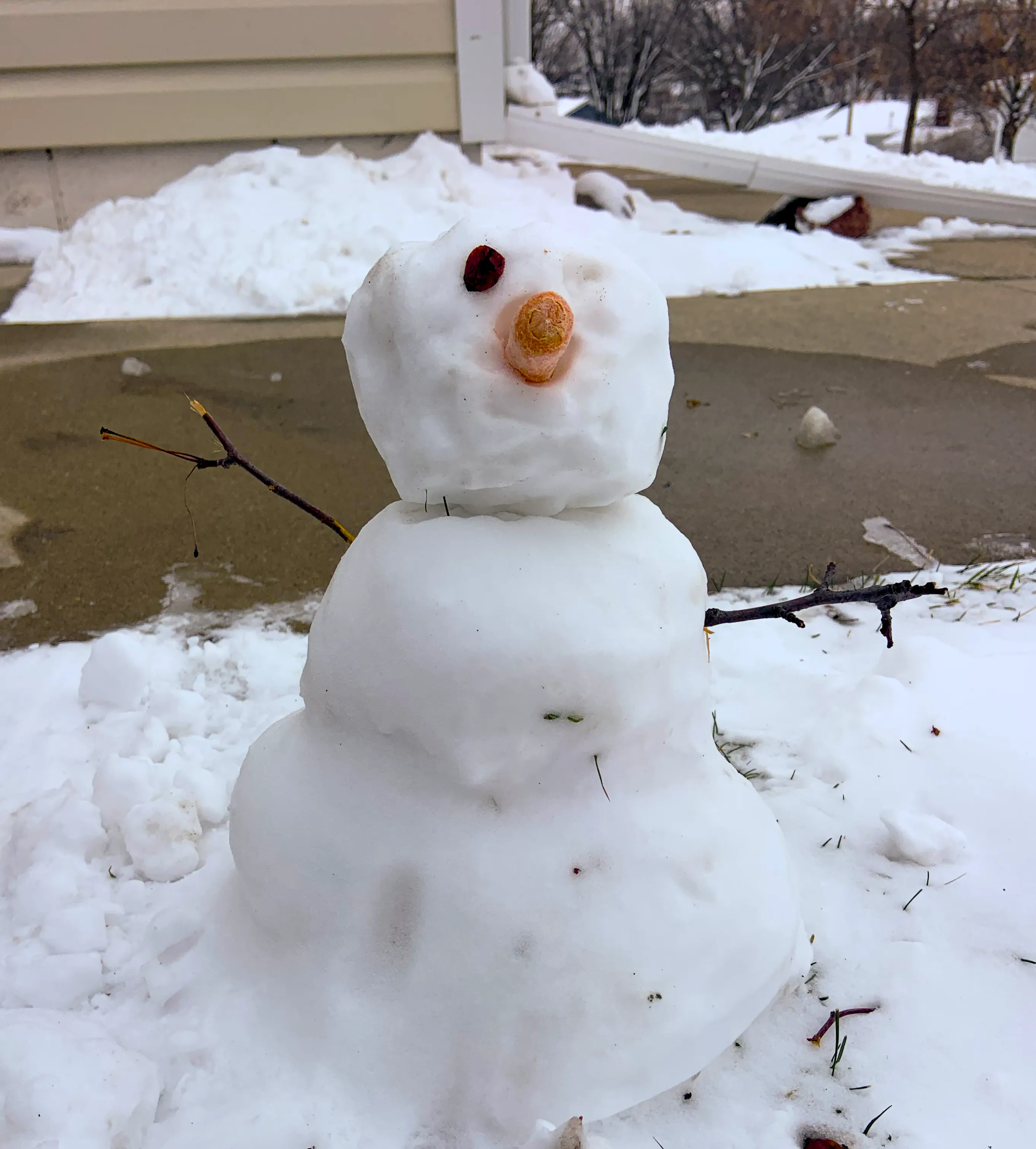
Mini snowman with baby carrot for a nose, raisins for eyes, and twigs for arms

One book describes classic snowman attachments as a black felt top hat, red scarf, coal eye pieces, carrot nose, and corn cob pipe.

== History ==
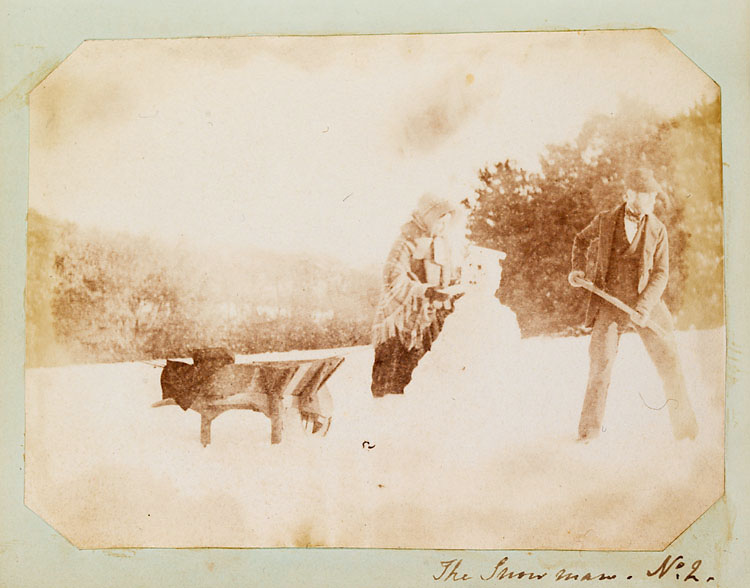
The earliest known photograph of a snowman, c. 1853, by Mary Dillwyn.

Documentation of the first snowman is unclear. However, Bob Eckstein, author of The History of the Snowman, documented snowmen from the Middle Ages by researching artistic depictions in European museums, art galleries, and libraries. The earliest documentation he found was an antisemitic marginal illustration from a 1380 Book of Hours, found in the Koninklijke Bibliotheek in The Hague. Michelangelo was commissioned by Piero de' Medici to make a snowman in 1494. The earliest known photograph of a snowman was taken circa 1853 by Welsh photographer Mary Dillwyn, the original of which is in the collections of the National Library of Wales.

While the origin of snowmen remains unclear, they have been used throughout history to make statements. In 1511, the city of Brussels held a snowman festival in hopes of appeasing its hungry and poor citizens. However, instead of building snowmen, the people built over 100 pornographic and satirical sculptures throughout the city. Eckstein suggested that this was "an early form of political commentary" directed against the city's then overlords, the Holy Roman Empire, though he conceded that any direct physical evidence of these historical examples has long since melted.

The concept of snowmen had made its way to North America by the Schenectady Massacre of 1690. It is said that on the night of the massacre, two guards who were in charge of guarding the north gate of the settlement of Schenectady built two snowmen to guard the gates while they went to the pub.

Snowmen became more popular when the character "Frosty the Snowman" came out, which originated from a song of the same name in 1950.

== In popular culture ==
=== In media ===
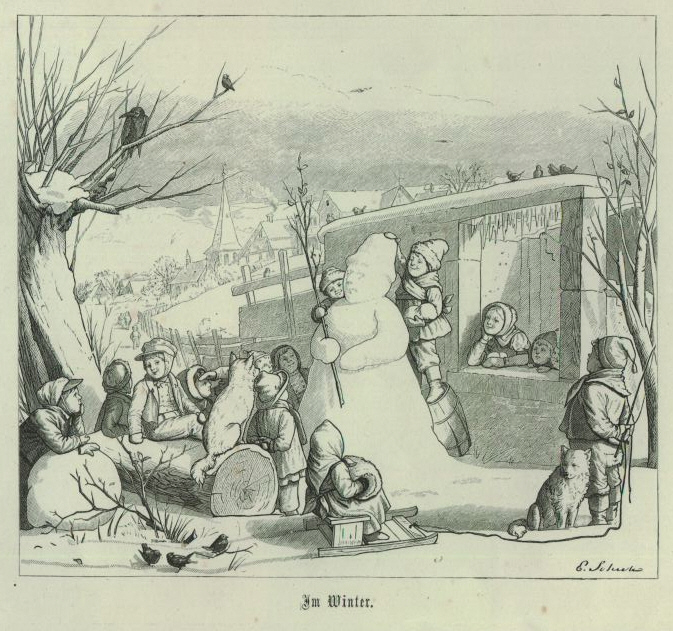
In this illustration from 1867, a snowman is surrounded by children.

Snowmen are a popular theme for Christmas and winter decorations and also in children's media. One of the oldest depictions of a snowman in media is Ted Eshbaugh's Fantasies cartoon "The Snowman," in 1932, which is also one of the first cartoons to be made in color. One of the most famous snowman characters is Frosty, the titular snowman in the popular holiday song "Frosty the Snowman" (later adapted into film and television specials), who was magically brought to life by the old silk hat used on his head. In addition to numerous related music and other media for Frosty, snowmen also feature as:

- Bouli, a French animated series about a snowman's adventures in a magical place.
- Der Schneemann, a 1943 animated short film created in Germany.
- Doc McStuffins features a plush snowman named Chilly.
- The Peanuts comic strip has several strips where the characters build snowmen in the winter months. One memorable serial has the gang forbidden to build snowmen because they lack the necessary government permits. Defiantly, Charlie Brown builds an unauthorized snowman in the middle of the night to serve as a test case.
- Jack Frost, a 1997 horror film in which a serial killer is transformed into a snowman.
- Jack Frost, a 1998 movie with Michael Keaton in which he wakes up as a snowman after a car accident.
- Oswald features a snowman named Johnny who runs an ice cream shop.
- The Snowman, British picture book (1978) by Raymond Briggs and animation (1982) directed by Dianne Jackson about a boy who builds a snowman that comes alive and takes him to the North Pole.
- Tabaluga's main antagonist in his series is an evil snowman called Arktos.
- In Pokémon the Ice Type Galarian Forms of Darumaka and Darmanitan are based on the Yeti, whereas Darmanitan's Zen Mode which is Ice/Fire, is based on the Snowman.
- Calvin and Hobbes, an American cartoon by Bill Watterson, contains many instances of Calvin building snowmen, many of which are deformed or otherwise abnormal, often used to poke fun at the art world.
- Hans Christian Andersen wrote a winter fairy story, The Snowman.
- Dennis Jürgensen's horror story "The Snowman", is about a boy traumatized by being locked in a meat freezer.
- R. L. Stine's Goosebumps story titled "Beware, the Snowman" featured a monstrous snowman.
- The 2013 film Frozen features a living snowman named Olaf who longs to see summer. The film score includes a song about building a snowman.
- The 2017 psychological thriller film The Snowman features a serial killer who builds snowmen at the scene of his crimes.
- In 2022, the snowman mascot named “Snow King” was created in China from Mixue.

=== Snowman-themed items ===
Snowmen can also be a theme for toys, costumes, and decorations. They have been featured on New Year stamps, for example, in Russia and other post-Soviet states.

One common time for snowman-themed decorations is during the winter holiday and Christmas season, where it is celebrated. One craft book suggested a plan making a small snowman doll out of white glove, ribbon, and other craft supplies.

One book on snowmen, which included instructions on working with real snow, also mentions snowman-themed sweets and confections. Some options for snowman-themed dessert items include ice cream, marshmallows, and macaroons.

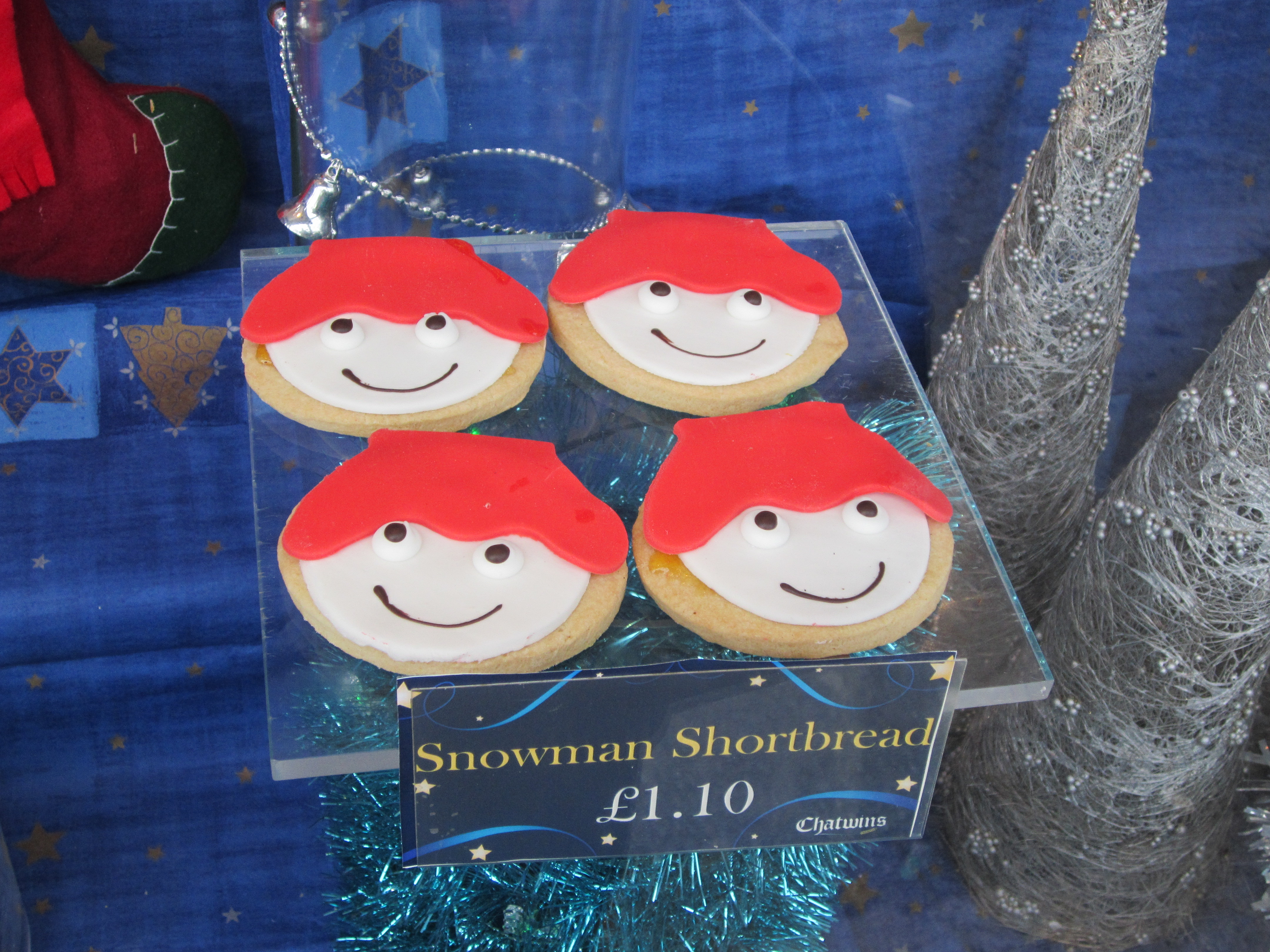
Snowman-themed cookies

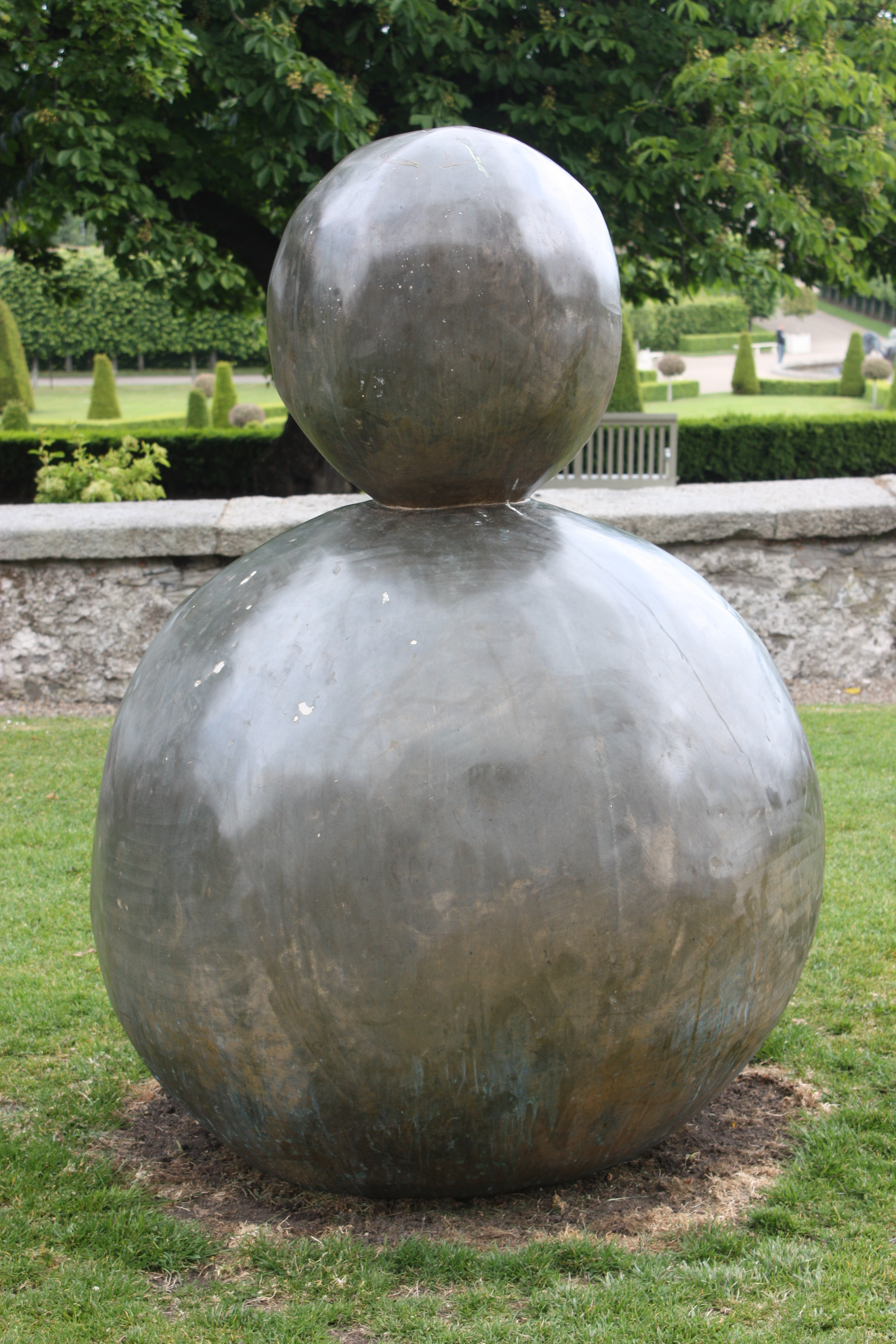
Snowman-inspired bronze sculpture

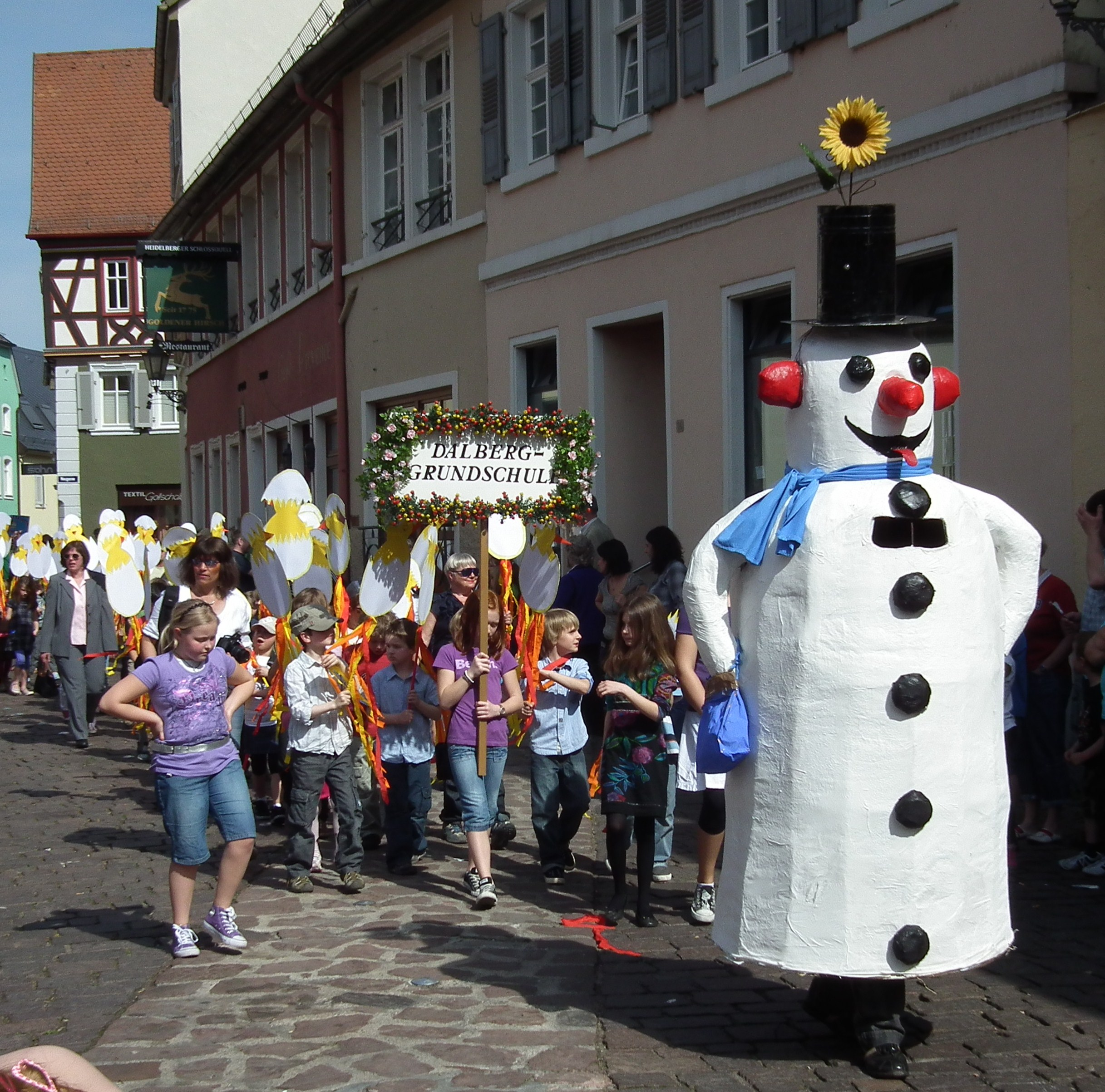
Person in snowman costume

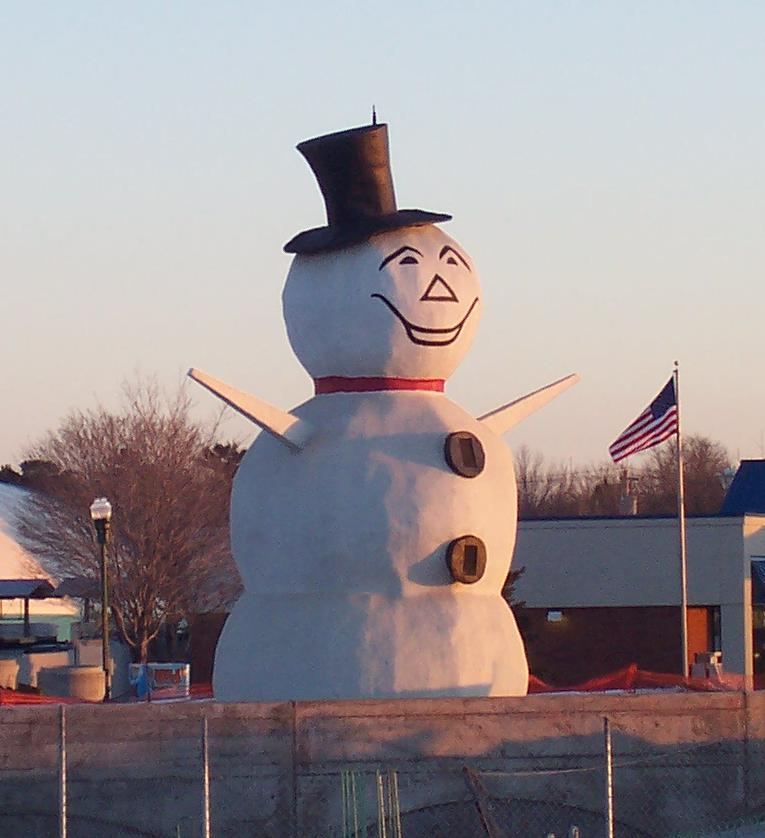
Snowman display statue

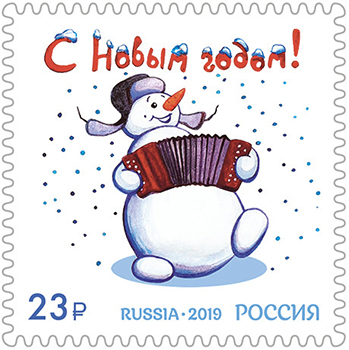
A snowman in ushanka playing on a garmon, 2019 New Year stamp of Russia

=== Giant snowmen and records ===
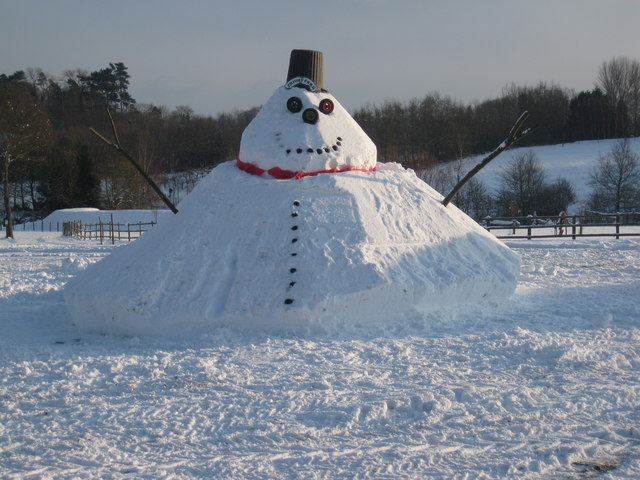
Larger style of a snowman with a conical base. The angle of repose of a piled substance may be an aspect of snowman building at this size, depending on the properties of the snow and the method of construction.

In 2015, a man from the U.S. state of Wisconsin was noted for making a large snowman 22 feet tall and with a base 12 feet wide.

The record for the world's largest snowman or snowwoman was set in 2008 in Bethel, Maine. The snowwoman stood 122 feet 1 inch (37.21 m) in height, and was named Olympia in honor of Olympia Snowe, a U.S. Senator representing the state of Maine.

The previous record was a snowman built in Bethel, Maine, in February 1999. The snowman was named "Angus, King of the Mountain" in honor of the then-current governor of Maine, Angus King. It was 113 feet 7 inches (34.62 m) tall and weighed over 9,000,000 pounds (4,080,000 kg).

A large snowman known as "Snowzilla" has been built each winter in Anchorage, Alaska.

In December 2016 the smallest snowman of sorts was created in a nano-fabrication facility at University of Western Ontario. It consisted of three roughly 0.9 micron spheres of silica, platinum arms and nose, and a face made by an ion beam.

== Variations ==
In addition to snowmen, other things can be made from snow. Typical variations on the snowman concept involve producing other snow creatures or snow decorations.

A snow sculpture of a woman is called a snowwoman. In some Slavic countries, a variation of the snowman is often constructed called a snow grandma. This only uses two snowballs.

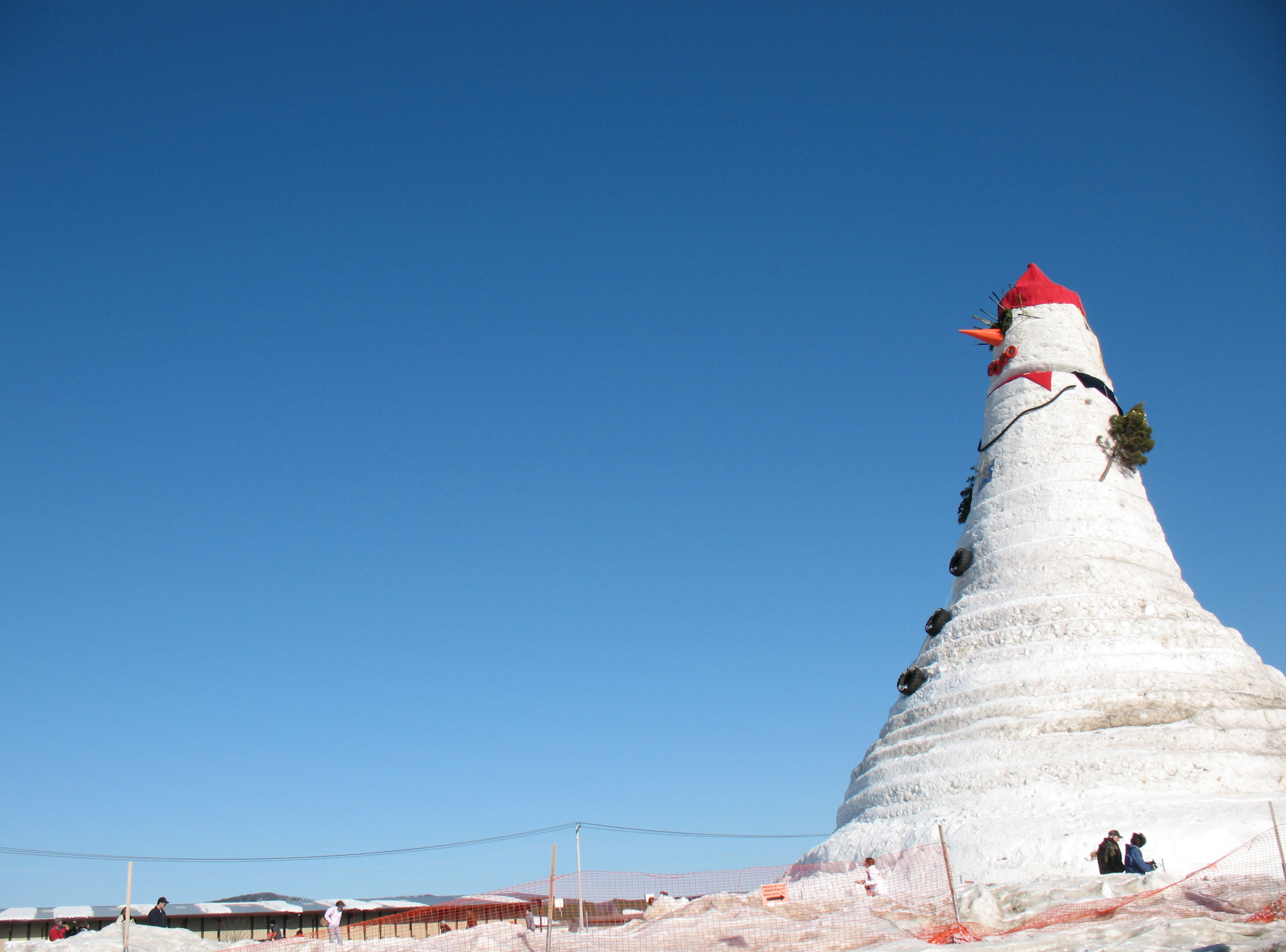
The world's largest snowwoman or snowman, a 122 feet 1 inch (37.21 m) tall snowwoman from 2008, named Olympia in honor of Olympia Snowe

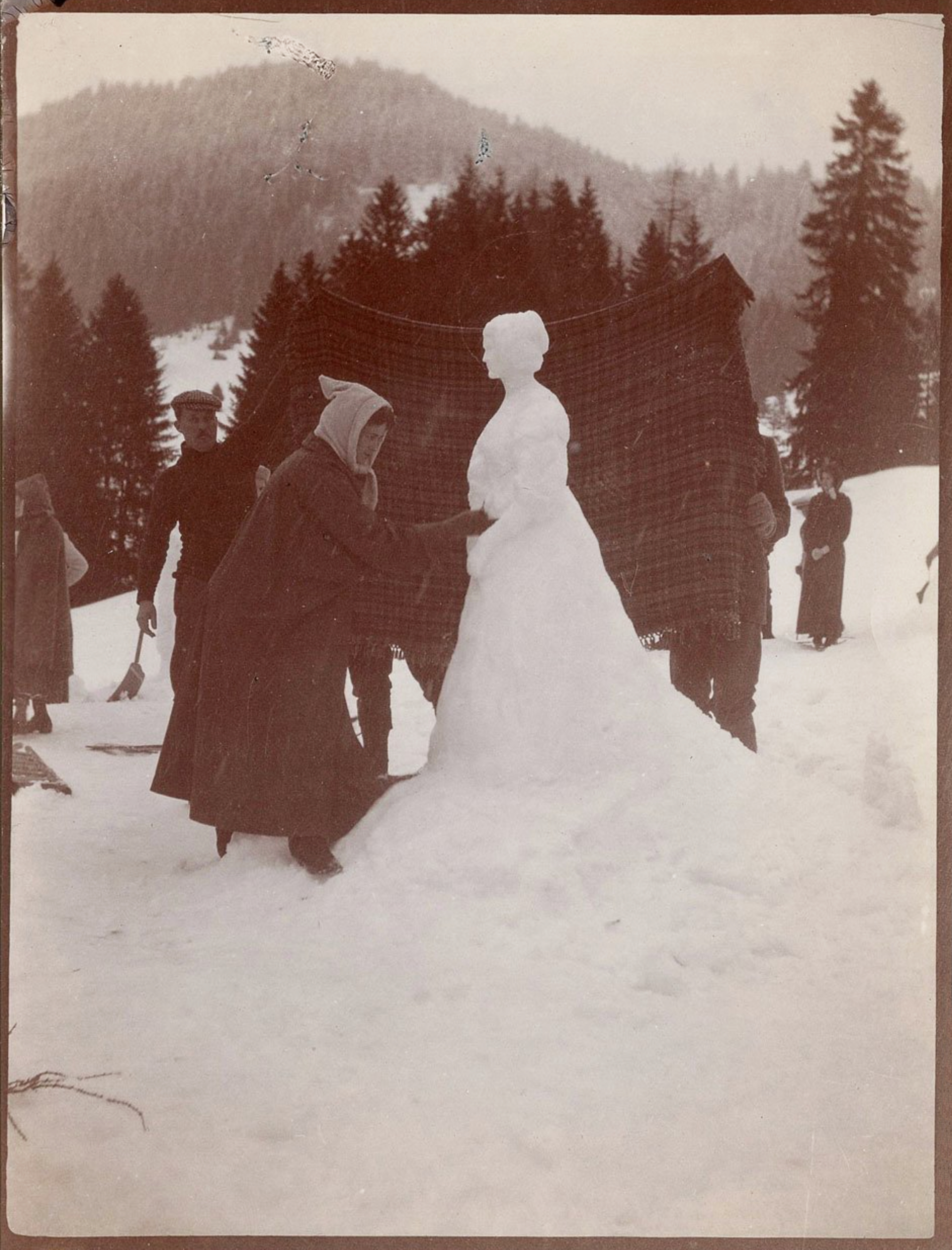
Snowwomen can be as hard to photograph as snowmen. Here, two assistants hold up a blanket behind the sculpture to increase the contrast. Photograph circa 1910

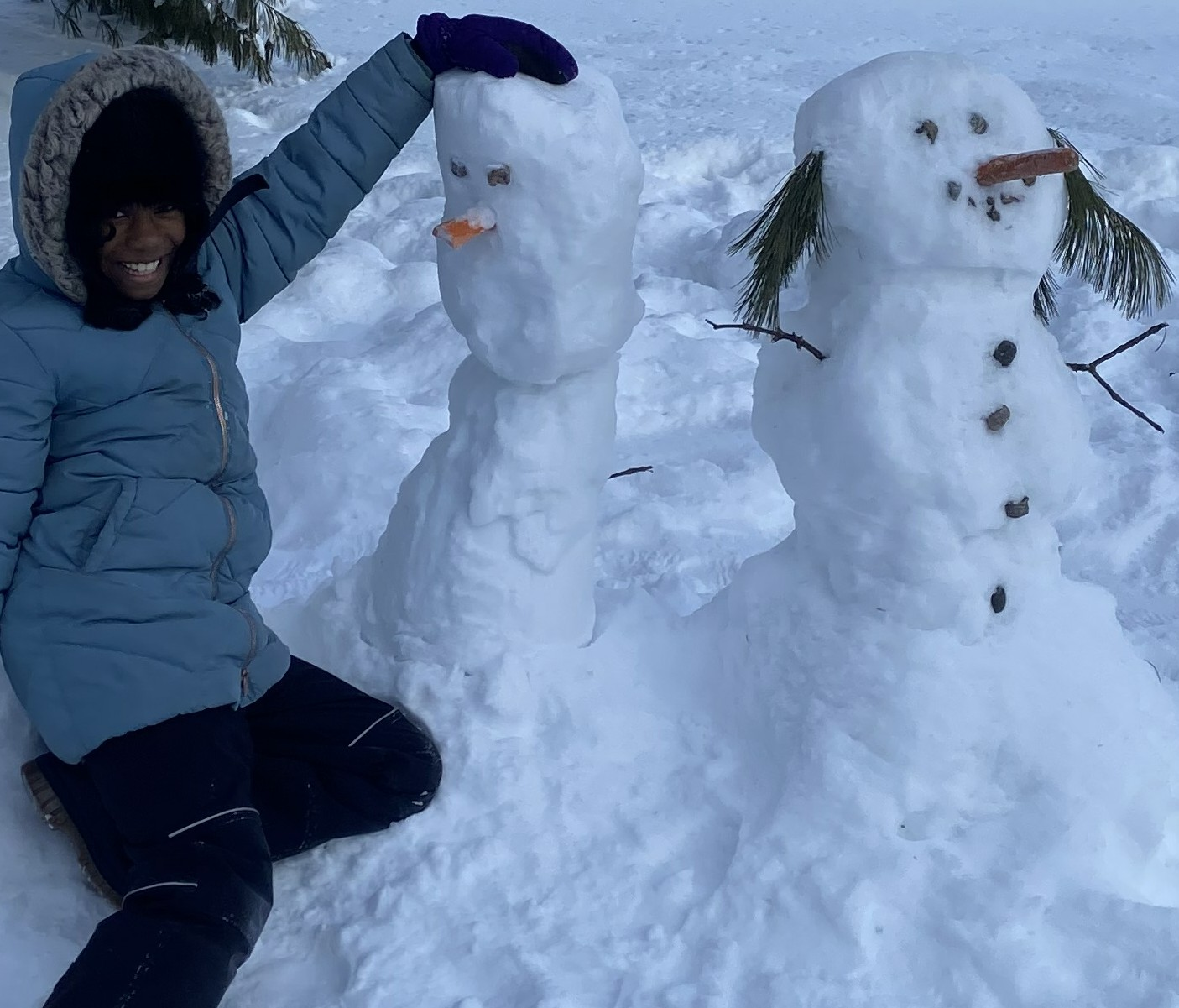
Snowwoman & her snowchild, Canada.

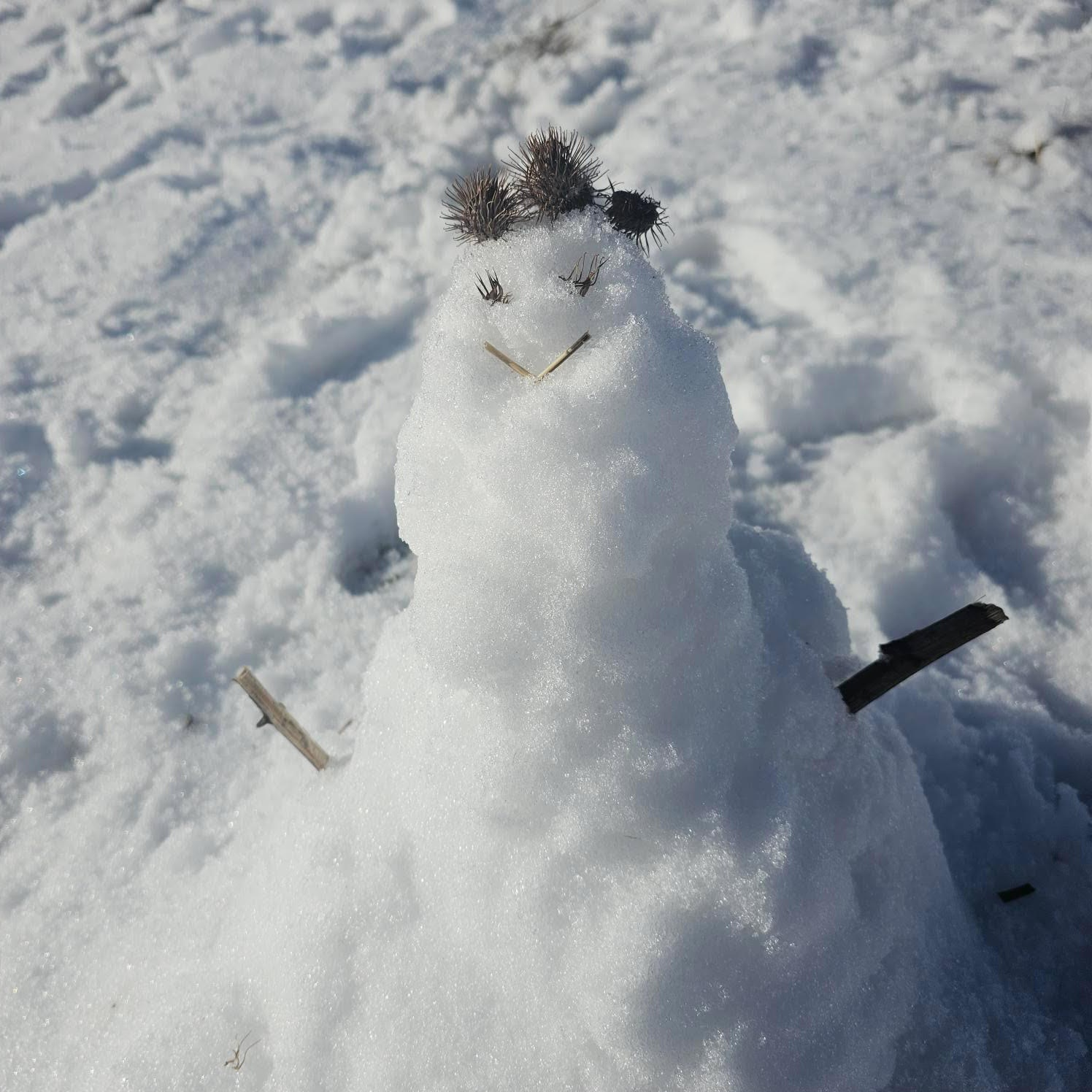
A snowwoman or "snow queen" with crown in the French Alps

=== Yuki Cone ===
The Yuki Cone, named after the Japanese word for snow, involves building a small cone-shaped structure from snowballs, illuminated from the inside with a tea-light.

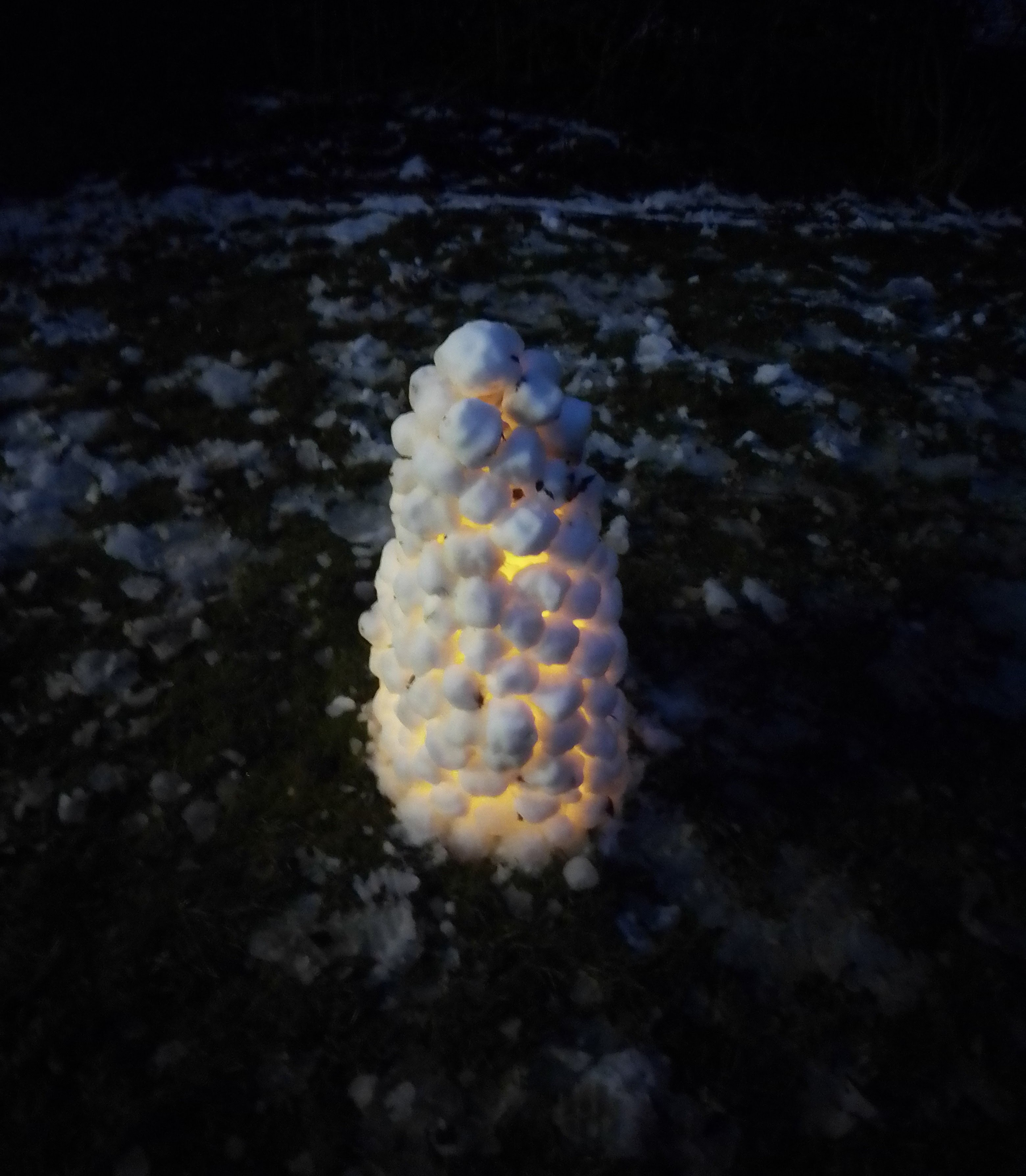
The Yuki Cone

=== Other variants ===
Sometimes other raw material might be used to create objects that mimic the snowman concept.

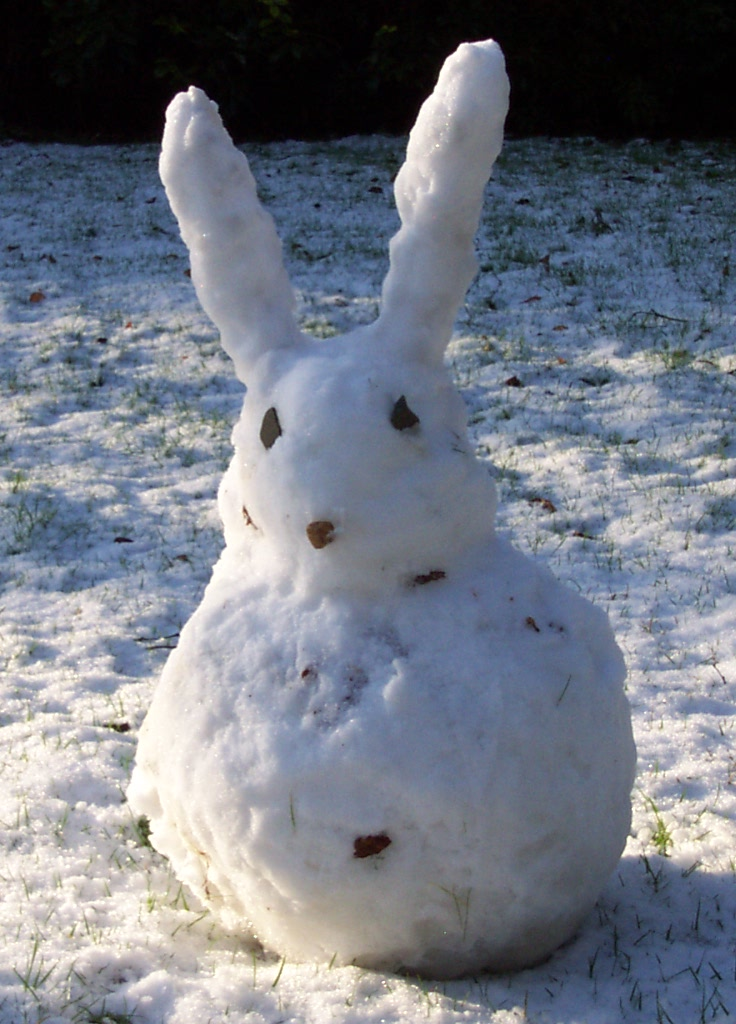
Snowrabbit

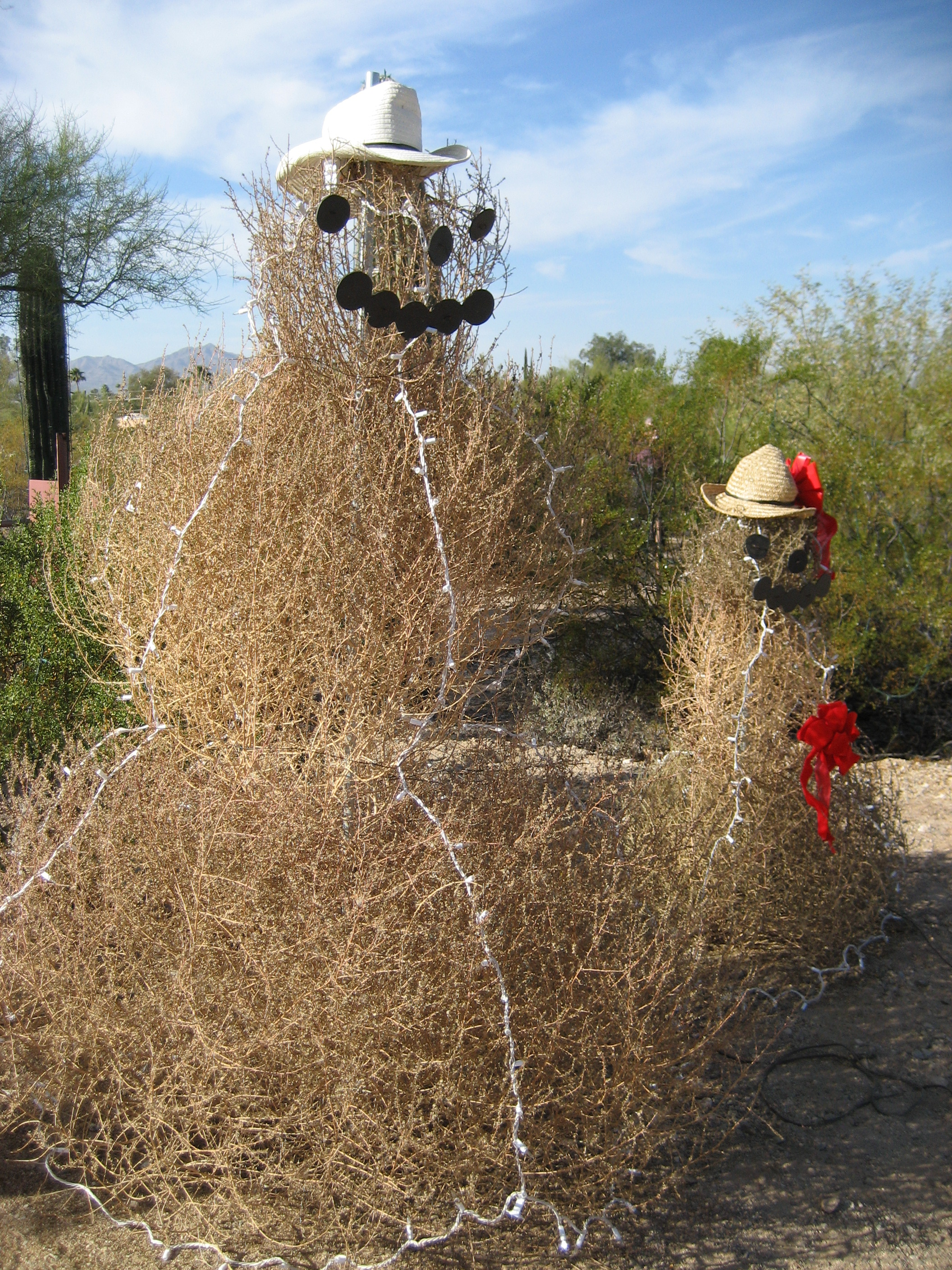
Desert "snowmen" in Tohono Chul Park, Tucson, Arizona, made out of tumbleweeds

Timelapse video of making of a "snowman" from logs

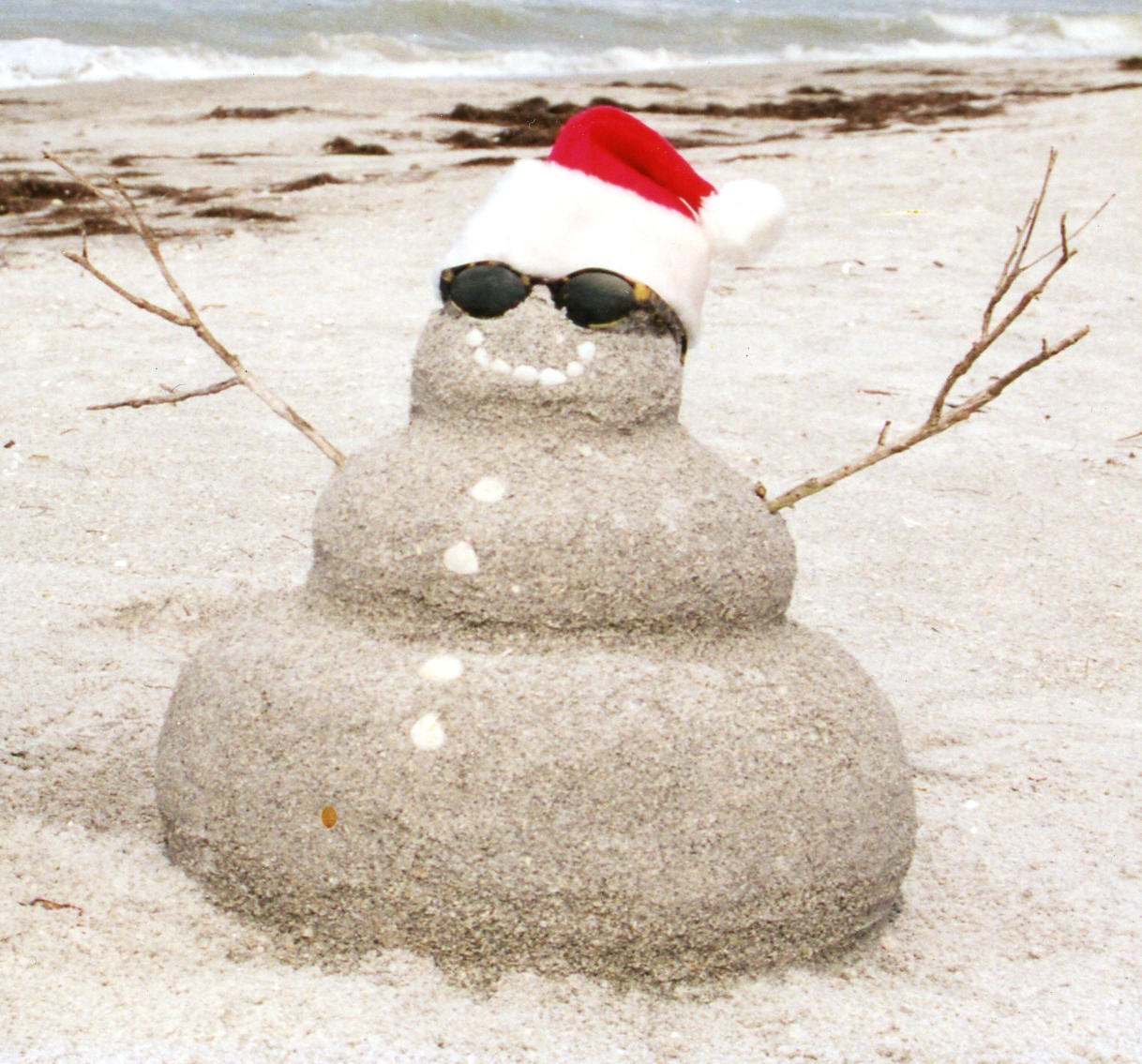
A "sandman" constructed from wet sand on Indian Rocks Beach, Florida.

=== Japan ===
In Japanese, snowmen are called yukidaruma (Japanese: 雪だるま). Possibly because the shape is related to a daruma doll, they usually only have two sections instead of three. There is also a longstanding tradition in Japan of creating snow rabbits, or yukiusagi (雪うさぎ).

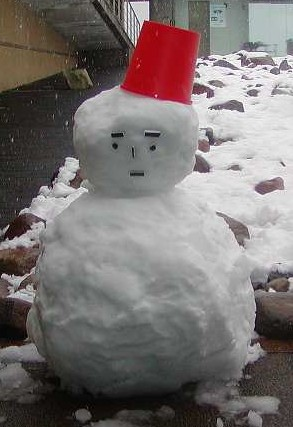
Japanese snowman (yukidaruma) with 2 parts and a bucket hat.

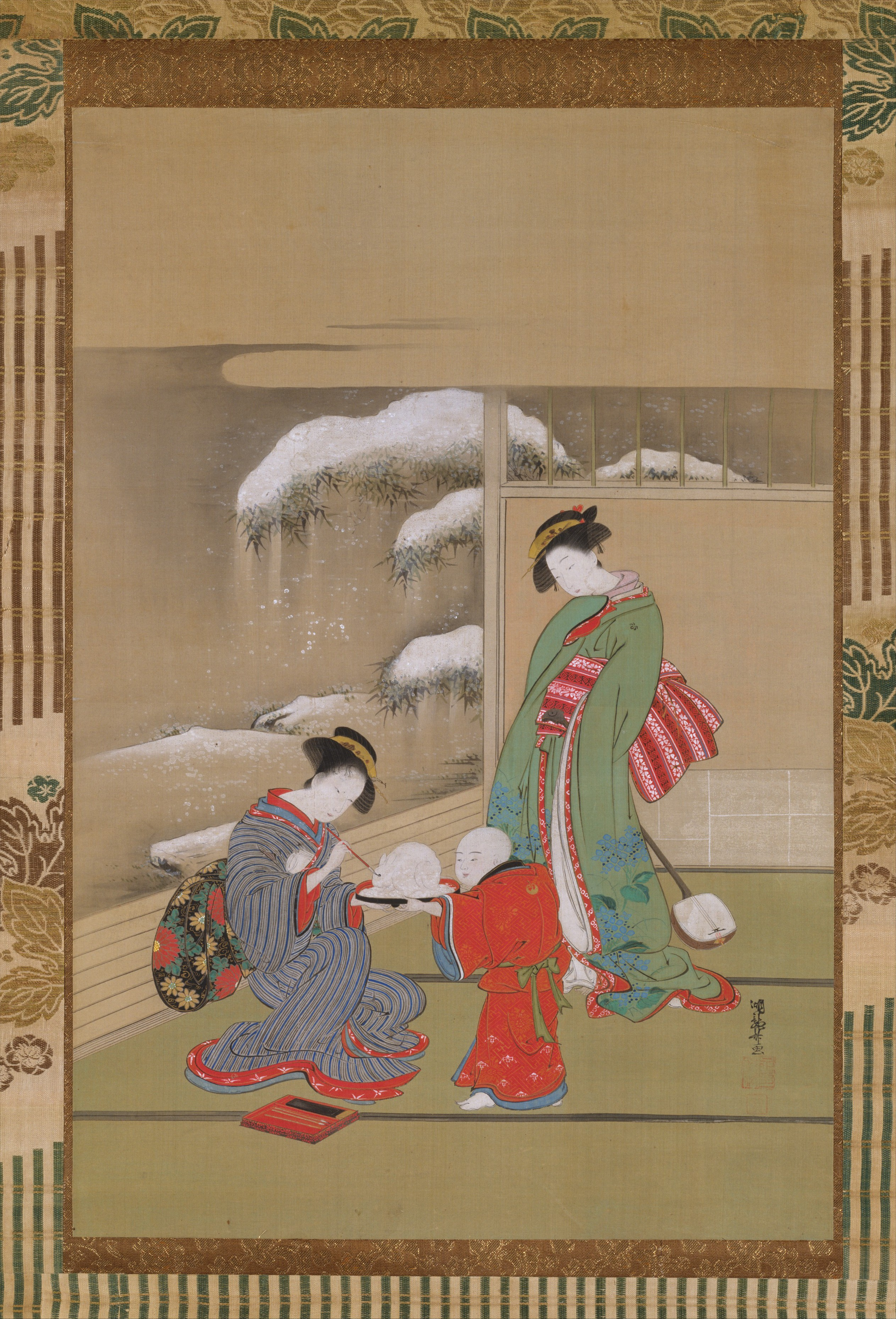
Painting the Eyes on a Snow Rabbit by Isoda Koryūsai (circa 1780, Japan) depicts a rabbit snow sculpture.

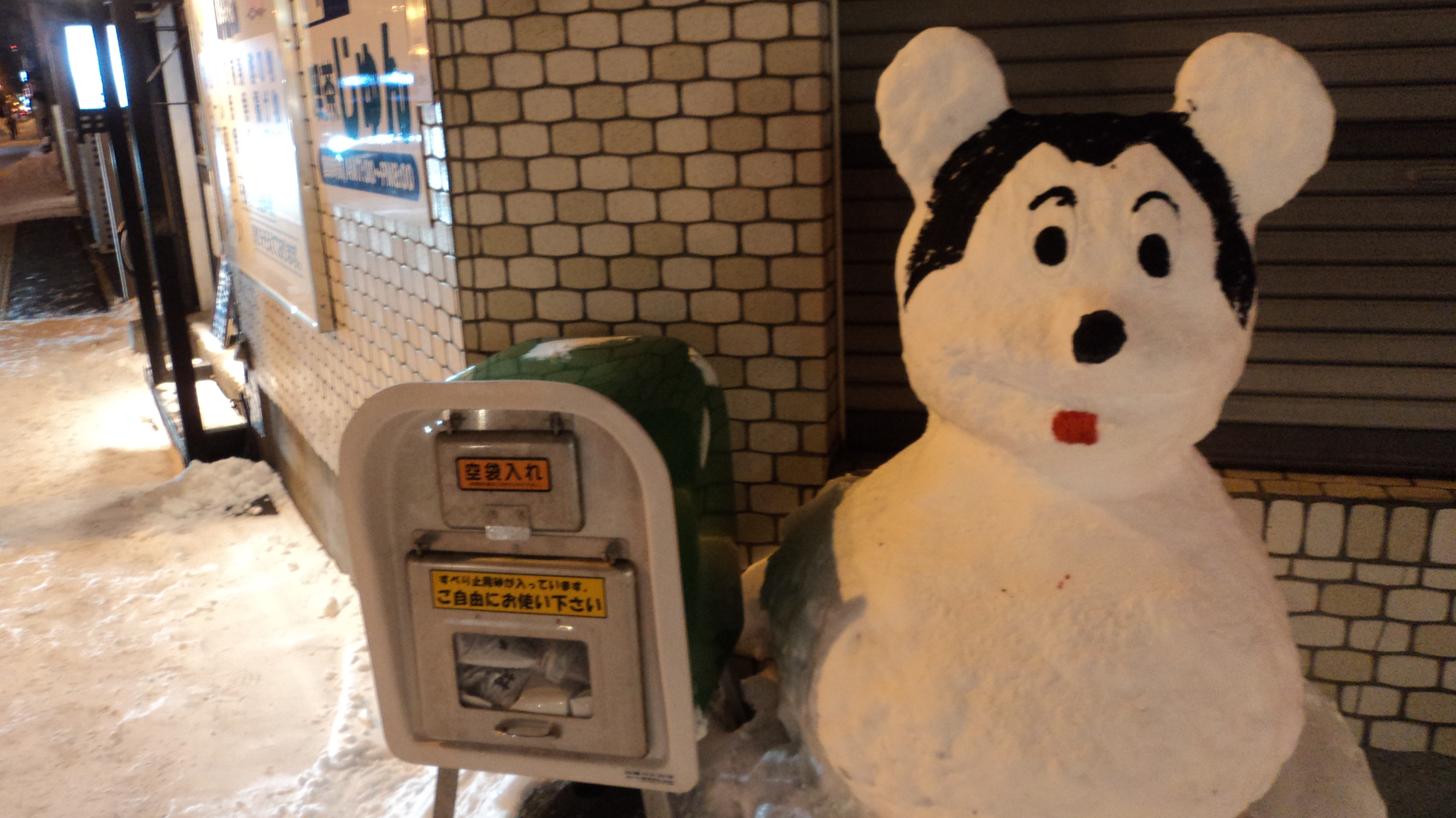
A Mickey Mouse-inspired snowman in Sapporo, Japan

=== Unicode ===
Sample	Unicode	HTML	Description
☃	U+2603	&#9731;	Snowman
⛄	U+26C4	&#9924;	Snowman without snow
⛇	U+26C7	&#9927;	Black snowman

== See also ==
- Snow sculpture
- Snowball
- Inuksuk
