= Survival Zone =

- Directed by: Percival Rubens
- Written by: Eric Brown; Percival Rubens
- Produced by: David Dalling; Frank Evans; Percival Rubens
- Starring: Gary Lockwood; Camilla Sparv; Morgan Stevens; Zoli Marki
- Cinematography: Vincent G. Cox; Colin Taylor
- Music by: Nick Labuschagne
- Distributed by: Commedia Pictures Inc.
- Release date: 1983 (U.S.)
- Running time: 90 minutes
- Country: South Africa
- Language: English

Survival Zone is a 1983 South African post-apocalyptic action-thriller directed by Percival Rubens and starring Gary Lockwood, Camilla Sparv, Morgan Stevens, and Zoli Marki.

== Plot ==
In the near future of 1989, the world has collapsed during a nuclear war and the few survivors must make do as best they can. Ben Faber operates a family farm and is isolated from world events. They live a reasonably happy life until they are besieged by a brutal and cannibalistic motorcycle gang who want to eat men and reproduce with the women. The family is forced to protect themselves with the weapons found in the house. Concurrent with this they have given a mysterious stranger shelter.

== Cast ==
- Gary Lockwood .... Ben Faber
- Camilla Sparv .... Lucy Faber
- Morgan Stevens .... Adam Strong
- Zoli Marki (Zoli Marquess) .... Rachel Faber
- Ian Steadman .... Bigman Bigman

== Background ==
Survival Zone is a low-budget "B" film inspired by the Australian film Mad Max 2. Screenplay, direction and production by Percival Rubens with a screenwriting assist by Eric Brown.

== Release ==
Survival Zone received a theatrical release in the United States in 1983.

== Reception ==
In Creature Feature, John Stanley found the movie predictable, giving it two out of five stars. However, he did find that the movie offers surprising philosophical take on life after an apocalypse. Mike Bogue noted in his book Watching the World Die that the actors do their best, but that the night scenes were "murky" and it was hard to make out details.

A reviewer for The Monitor found the film amateurish and questioned if Rubens and his producer intended for it to be "a play upon post-World War III adventure flicks, what with the improbable situations developed."
