= Grimmway Farms =

Carrot magnate

Grimmway Farms is the largest grower, producer, and shipper of carrots in the world. It is headquartered in Bakersfield, California, and was family owned and operated for more than 40 years until it was sold to a private equity firm in 2020 for an undisclosed price. Grimmway’s divisions include Grimmway Farms, Cal-Organic Farms, Bunny-Luv, and Bunny-Luv Organic. Its operations are in California, Colorado, Florida, Georgia, Oregon, and Washington. The company has been recognized for popularizing the baby-cut carrot.

== History ==
Grimmway Farms was established in the mid-1960s when brothers Rodney Grimm and Robert Grimm started farming five acres of sweet corn on their grandfather's chicken farm in Anaheim, California. Through the years, they added other crops, which they sold alongside the corn in small family-run roadside produce stands. In the early 1980s, after the concept of baby carrots was successfully test-marketed by another company in Los Angeles, the Grimm brothers relocated to Kern County and began processing baby carrots. By 2002, the company was able to process millions of pounds of baby carrots a day.

In 1991, Grimmway Farms began expanding into different areas of agriculture with the acquisition of Belridge Farms (citrus). The expansion continued with the acquisition of Mike Yurosek & Sons, another carrot processing company, in the early 1990s.

In 1998, company president Rodney Grimm died of cancer at the age of 51. Robert Grimm then took over as company president. During his tenure, Grimmway Farms began buying other companies. By 2000, it had reportedly grown into a $350-million operation with five plants in the United States, and products shipping to more than 20 countries. In 2001, Grimmway Farms purchased King Pak Farms, a potato growing, packing, and shipping operation in Edison, California.

On March 17, 2006, Robert Grimm died of a heart attack. He had served on the association's board since 1988. Following Robert Grimm's death, Jeff Meger, the Grimm's nephew and company vice president, took over as president of Grimmway Farms. In 2016, he was replaced by Jeff Huckaby.

The sons of founders Rod and Bob Grimm work for the company as well. Brandon Grimm, son of Bob Grimm, started at Grimmway in 2006 and is currently the General Manager of Organic Operations. They agreed to buy Oxnard based, San Miguel Produce, in 2024.

== Products ==
Grimmway Farms handles 10 million pounds of carrots a day and grows over 40,000 acres of carrots. Other Grimmway products include carrot juice concentrate and carrot juice based products used in soup bases, vegetable blends, condiment formulation, and flavor additives. Grimmway’s processed carrots are kosher certified (when applicable). Cal-Organic Farms, Grimmway Farms’ organic division, produces sixty-five year-round crops including: carrots, leeks, broccoli, and lettuce. Organic products are certified through CCOF, a recognized third-party approved by the USDA.

In 2024, a Grimmway carrot farm in New Cuyama, California, was linked to a multistate outbreak of E. coli, causing the Centers for Disease Control to recall Grimmway carrots from many stores.
