= Dead Heat on a Merry-Go-Round =

1966 crime film directed by Bernard Girard

- Theatrical film poster
- Directed by: Bernard Girard
- Written by: Bernard Girard
- Produced by: Carter DeHaven
- Starring: James Coburn; Camilla Sparv
- Cinematography: Lionel Lindon
- Edited by: William A. Lyon
- Music by: Stu Phillips
- Production company: Crescent Productions
- Distributed by: Columbia Pictures
- Release date: October 12, 1966 (New York City)
- Running time: 104 minutes
- Country: United States
- Language: English
- Budget: $1.7 million

Dead Heat on a Merry-Go-Round is a 1966 crime film written and directed by Bernard Girard, and starring James Coburn. It marked Harrison Ford's film debut.

== Plot ==
Con man Eli Kotch charms his way into a parole by playing on the emotions of a pretty psychologist, but drops her at the first opportunity to move around the country, romancing women and then stealing their possessions, or those of their employers. He has made a down payment on the blueprints to a bank at Los Angeles International Airport, but needs to raise $85,000 to complete the purchase.

In Boston, he seduces and marries Inger Knudsen, the secretary of a wealthy elderly woman. Eli sends her to L.A. to set up housekeeping, on the pretext that a songwriter there is interested in his poetry. Meanwhile, he burgles another woman to get the final amount of money he needs. Eli heads to Los Angeles, where he begins to assemble his gang for the bank robbery, which is timed to take place while the airport is distracted by the arrival of the Premier of the Soviet Union.

To keep Inger occupied, Eli sends her to take Polaroid snapshots around L.A., supposedly for a magazine article he is writing. Using costumes stolen from a movie studio, he and one of the gang masquerade as an Australian policeman escorting an extradited prisoner in order to get through airport security, while the other two dress as LAPD policemen to get into the bank, bypass the alarm, and get a bank employee to open the safe.

The gang pulls off the heist and makes a successful getaway to Mexico on a plane. Eli has no idea that Inger has been frantically trying to get in touch with him, because she has inherited $7 million from her former employer.

== Cast ==
- James Coburn as Eli Kotch
- Camilla Sparv as Inger Knudson
- Aldo Ray as Eddie Hart
- Nina Wayne as Frieda Schmid
- Robert Webber as Milo Stewart
- Rose Marie as Margaret Kirby
- Marian McCargo as Dr. Marion Hague
- Michael Strong as Paul Feng
- Severn Darden as Miles Fisher
- James Westerfield as Jack Balter
- Phillip Pine as George Logan
- Simon Scott as William Anderson
- Harrison Ford as a bellhop (uncredited)
- Sabrina Scharf as Girl in bed with Eli

== Production ==
The film was announced in September 1964 as Eli Kotch and producer Carter DeHaven and writer Bernard Girad set up a company, Crescent, at Columbia. Both men had worked extensively in television, and wanted to get into features. The film was an original of Girard's. "I wouldn't so much call Eli Kotch a con man as a contemporary hero," said Girard. "He exploits a lot of people and breaks all the rules in order to enjoy himself, parlaying one job into another until even at the end, when he's ready to start all over again."

At one stage Sidney J. Furie was announced as director and Tony Curtis was going to star. However, Girard eventually directed the film and Curtis dropped out.

James Coburn signed to play the lead just before his breakout role in In Like Flint.

Another working title was "The Big Noise". The actual title used, Dead Heat on a Merry-Go-Round appears in the film as the novel being written by Coburn's character under the pseudonym of "Henry Silverstein". Dead Heat on a Merry-Go-Round was later used as the title of a book of short stories written by Japanese author Haruki Murakami and first published in 1985.

Filming took place in early 1966. The film was shot in Boston and Los Angeles, including at the Los Angeles International Airport. The movie featured several Columbia contract players such as Nina Gray, Stephanie Hill and Harrison Ford.

== Recognition ==
Sparv was awarded a Golden Globe as Most Promising Newcomer (female) in 1967, for her performance, by the Hollywood Foreign Press Association.

The Los Angeles Times felt the final segment where Coburn imitates an Australian "saves a picture that one is just about to write off as one of those ho hum sex things."

Variety wrote "The idea and the premise... is okay but it doesn't jell, and the title, a deliberate attempt to be cute, is meaningless. What leads up to the comedy-melodrama O. Henry finale most likely was very funny in the producers' minds, but much of the action is so fragmentary and episodic that there is not sufficient exposition and the treatment goes overboard in striving for effect."

FilmInk called it "a heist film in which every woman finds Coburn irresistible, and he imitates an Australian at the end. The movie is best remembered today for featuring Harrison Ford in a small role."

== See also ==
- List of American films of 1966
