= Mike Yurosek =

American farmer

Mike Yurosek (September 28, 1922 – June 12, 2005) was a California farmer who invented the baby-cut carrot.

== Baby-cut carrot ==
The "baby-cut carrot" is extremely popular in the United States; it is not a separate breed but a way of processing regular full-sized carrots to increase utilization and decrease waste. Mike Yurosek invented this in 1986, and he and his son David promoted the baby-cut carrot in the early 1980s in Bakersfield, California through their Bunny Luv produce company. Major carrot companies followed their lead, and the baby-cut carrot is now one of the industry's top sellers.

== Family ==
Mike Yurosek was the uncle of actor Gary Lockwood. He is also the great-grandfather of Minnesota Vikings tight end Ben Yurosek.
