= Snowzilla (snowman) =

Giant snowman in Alaska, U.S.

Coordinates: 61.20675°N 149.81802°W

Snowzilla is a giant snowman which has been erected each pre-Christmas season between 2005 and an unspecified time in the early 2010s on the front yard of private resident Billy Powers' home in Anchorage, Alaska. Keeping good on a promise to return again some day, Snowzilla was reconstructed once more during a particularly snowy and cold December 2023.

== History ==
The first Snowzilla was built in 2005. It rose to 16 feet (4.9 m) and featured a corncob pipe, a carrot nose, and two eyes made out of beer bottles. After drawing widespread attention, the snowman returned the following year, built to a height of 22 feet (6.7 m). In 2008 the accumulated snow rose to an estimated 25 feet (7.6 m) height.

== Controversy ==
One neighbor in the block complained of heavy traffic and cited safety concerns about a very large snowman on the front lawn of a residential neighborhood, as a result of which city officials issued a cease and desist order in December 2008, preventing Snowzilla from being completed (it was about 50% completed when the order was issued and the accumulated snow removed). However, a few days later it re-appeared on Powers' lawn, although he denied making it.

A strong public outcry soon arose over the apparent municipal interference with the holiday tradition, and a website (formerly "Snowzilla.org") appeared on 23 December 2008. On Christmas morning, a group of small sign-carrying snowmen appeared in front of Anchorage city hall, but the city quickly demolished them. In 2009, a new mayor was sitting in City Hall, and the family said that it expected to be able to erect the giant snowman without interference. Writing about the January 2011 version, an editor for Alaska magazine described Snowzilla as "a symbol of Alaska civil disobedience enacted, appropriately enough, in snow".
