= The Foster Gang =

The Foster Gang is a 1964 South African feature film about the Foster gang. It was written and directed by Percival Rubens and produced Pierre de Wett.

== Premise ==
Variety indicated that the film told "the true story of a notorious band of gangsters who terrorized Johannesburg in its eventful mining-camps of fifty years ago."

== Production ==
The film was directed by Percival Rubens and produced by Pierre de Wett.
