= The Miracle of 1511 =

Historic festival involving the building of satirical snowmen

The Miracle of 1511 (Dutch: De sneeuwpoppen van 1511) was a festival in Brussels in which the locals built approximately 110 satirical snowmen. It is estimated that more than half of the snowmen portrayed pornographic or sexual characters. Examples of snowmen built included a snownun that was seducing a man, a snowman and a snowwoman having sex in front of the town fountain and a naked snowboy urinating into the mouth of a drunken snowman. There were also snow unicorns, snow mermaids, a snow dentist, and snow prostitutes enticing people into the city's red light district. Among the political snowmen created were "a snow virgin with a unicorn in her lap", that was built in front of the ducal palace in Coudenberg, the home of Holy Roman Emperor Charles V. This was in protest to him being absent and instead living with his aunt Margaret of Austria in Mechelen.

Before the Miracle, there had been six weeks of cold weather (more common then than now owing to the Little Ice Age). Combined with mass population growth and a large wealth disparity between the peasants and the ruling House of Habsburg, the locals decided to use the snowmen as a form of protest. The different socioeconomic classes each constructed different kinds of snowman. As a result, the poor would destroy snowmen built by the ruling classes. Eventually, the Miracle concluded when the snow thawed during the warm following spring, which led to flooding in Brussels. Later that month, when the water was all gone, the King of France donated 1000 gold coins to the town.

Dutch poet Jan Smeken wrote about the Miracle in his poem "Dwonder van claren ijse en snee" [The miracle of pure ice and snow].
