= Percival Rubens =

South African film director, screenwriter and producer (1928–2009)

- Born: 29 December 1929; Krugersdorp
- Citizenship: South Africa
- Occupations: Film director, Screenwriter, Film producer

Percival Rubens (Krugersdorp, 29 December 1928 – Johannesburg, 13 June 2009) was a South African film director and scriptwriter.

== Filmography ==
=== Films ===
- The Boy and the Mountain (short) (1958)
- The Foster Gang (screenplay with Lee Marcus) (1964)
- The Long Red Shadow (screenplay with Lee Marcus) (1968)
- Strangers at Sunrise (screenplay with Lee Marcus) (1969),
- Mister Kingstreet’s War / Heroes Die Hard (screenplay with George Harding) (1971)
- Die Saboteurs (1974)
- Mighty Man (1978)
- The Demon (also screenwriter)) (1979)
- Survival Zone (screenplay with Eric Brown) (1982)
- Hostage (with Hanro Möhr) (1987)
- Zone / Okavango (1989)
- Sweet Murder (also screenwriter) (1990).

== Awards ==
Posthumous Golden Horn Lifetime Achievement Award for Direction from SAFTA in 2010.
