= Camilla Sparv =

Swedish actress (born 1943)

- Born: Camilla Margareta Sparv; 3 June 1943 (age 83); Stockholm, Sweden
- Occupation: Actress
- Years active: 1965–1993
- Spouses: Robert Evans (m. 1964; div. 1967) Herbert W. Hoover III (m. 1969; div. 1979) Fred Kolber (m. 1994; died 2016)
- Children: 3

Camilla Margareta Sparv (born 3 June 1943) is a Swedish actress, recognized with a Golden Globe award for her role opposite James Coburn in Dead Heat on a Merry-Go-Round (1966), but best known as Robert Redford's love interest in Downhill Racer (1969).

== Early life ==
Camilla Margareta Sparv was born in Stockholm, Sweden, on 3 June 1943.

== Career ==
Before entering films, Sparv was a photographer's model in Stockholm.

Sparv appeared in such films as: Dead Heat on a Merry-Go-Round (1966), Murderers' Row (1966), The Trouble with Angels (1966), Assignment K (1968), Nobody Runs Forever (1968), Mackenna's Gold (1969), Downhill Racer (1969), The Greek Tycoon (1978), Caboblanco (1980), and Survival Zone (1983), as well as the television shows Airwolf, The Rockford Files (SE2EP19), The Love Boat, Hawaii Five-O and the miniseries Jacqueline Susann's Valley of the Dolls (1981). In 1977, she appeared in "Never Con a Killer," the pilot for the ABC crime drama The Feather and Father Gang.

== Personal life ==
Sparv was briefly married to American film producer Robert Evans in 1965.

Sparv had two children with her second husband, Herbert W. 'Bunker' Hoover III, a Hoover vacuum heir, whom she married on 20 December 1969.

Sparv had one child with her third husband, Fred Kolber, later, a Madoff investor.

== Recognition ==
Sparv was awarded a Golden Globe as Most Promising Newcomer (female) in 1967 for her role opposite James Coburn in Dead Heat on a Merry-Go-Round (1966).
