= Baby carrot =

Carrot sold at a smaller size before reaching maturity

A baby carrot (true baby carrot) is a carrot harvested before reaching maturity and sold at that smaller size.

A baby-cut carrot, or mini-carrot (manufactured baby carrot), is a small piece cut from a larger carrot, peeled and shaped into a uniform size. Confusion occurs when baby-cut carrots are marketed purposely as "baby carrots".

== Baby carrots ==
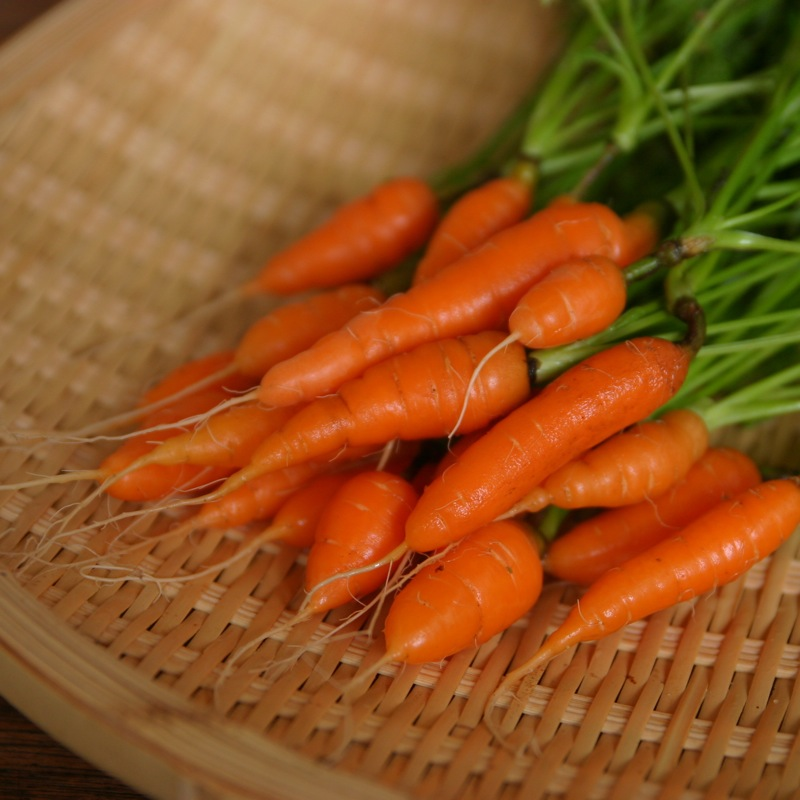
Baby carrots

The immature roots of the carrot plant are sometimes harvested simply as the result of crop thinning, but are also grown to this size as a specialty crop. Certain cultivars of carrots have been bred to be used at the "baby" stage. One such cultivar is 'Amsterdam Forcing'. This process was developed at Beechnut Farms, bought by Zellwin Farms. These farms originally developed food for World War II, but wanted to sell food for civilians. A team of two led the research. According to Dole, baby carrots are sweeter and more tender than full-grown carrots.

== Baby-cut carrots ==
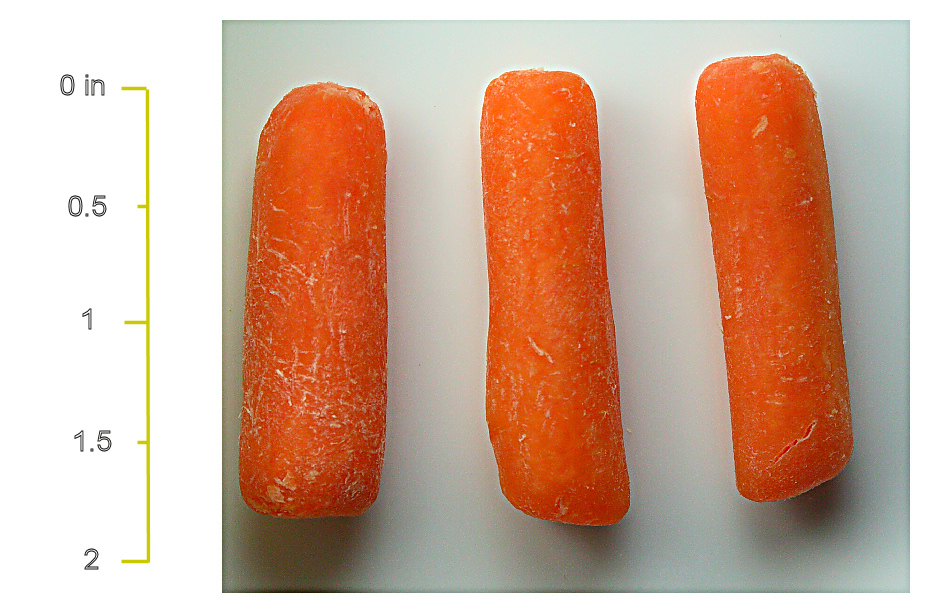
Baby-cut carrots

Taking misshapen or broken fully-grown carrots and cutting them to a smaller size for sale was an innovation made by California carrot farmer Mike Yurosek in 1986 to reduce food waste.

In 2006, nearly three-quarters of the fresh baby-cut carrots produced in the United States came from Bakersfield, California. Bolthouse Farms and Grimmway Farms are the world's two largest growers, processors, and shippers of baby-cut carrots.

=== Production ===
To make baby-cut carrots, large carrots are put into a machine and cut into two-inch (5 cm) sections, then abraded (scraped) down to size, their ends rounded by the same process.

1. In the field, two-story carrot harvesters use long metal prongs to open up the soil, while rubber belts grab the green tops and pull. The carrots ride up the belts to the top of the picker, where an automated cutter snips off the greens.
2. They are trucked to the processing plant, where they are put in icy water to bring their temperature down to 3 °C (37 °F) to inhibit spoiling.
3. They are sorted by thickness. Thin carrots continue on the processing line; the others will be used as whole carrots, juice, or cattle feed. An inspector looks for rocks, debris or malformed carrots that slip through.
4. The carrots are shaped into two-inch (5 cm) pieces by automated cutters. An optical sorter discards any piece that has green on it.
5. The pieces are pumped through pipes to the peeling tanks. The peelers rotate, scraping the skin off the carrots. There are two stages: an initial rough peel and then a final "polishing."
6. To reduce microbial contamination, baby-cut carrots may be treated with small amounts of chlorine. Those that are so treated will be subsequently rinsed with potable water to remove the excess chlorine before being packaged. According to the Canadian Food Inspection Agency, the use of chlorine as an antimicrobial treatment (similar to the chlorination of drinking water) is a current accepted practice in the processing for all fresh-cut ready-to-eat vegetables.
7. The carrots are weighed and bagged by an automated scale and packager, then placed in cold storage until they are shipped.

The white blush sometimes visible on the surface of baby-cut carrots is caused by dehydration of the cut surface. Baby-cut carrots are more prone to develop this because their entire surface area is a cut surface. Low-temperature, high-humidity storage can minimize the white appearance.

=== Marketing ===
In September 2010, a marketing initiative called "Eat'em Like Junk Food" was launched in the United States by a group of nearly 50 carrot producers led by Bolthouse Farms (calling themselves "A Bunch of Carrot Farmers") that sought to promote baby-cut carrots as an alternative to junk food. The campaign mimicked tactics typically employed by snack food marketers, including snack-food-like packaging; futuristic, sexual, and extreme sports-themed TV commercials; carrot vending machines in schools; and an iPhone game and website.
