= Sarel du Toit =

Sarel Petrus du Toit
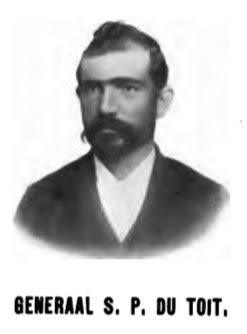
- Boer War General Sarel Petrus du Toit (1864–1930)

Personal details
- Born: 28 June 1864 Prince Albert, Cape Colony
- Died: 22 November 1930 (aged 66) Versailles Farm, Charter, Southern Rhodesia
- Occupation: Representative for Wolmaransstad in the Eerste Volksraad 1896, assistent general, combat general

Military service
- Allegiance: South African Republic
- Battles/wars: Second Boer War: Siege of Kimberley; Battle of Modder River; Battle of Veertien Strome; Battle of Silkaatsnek; Battle at Hartebeestfontein; Battle at Lichtenburg; Battle at Makwassiebergen; Battle at Brakspruit; Battle of Rooiwal

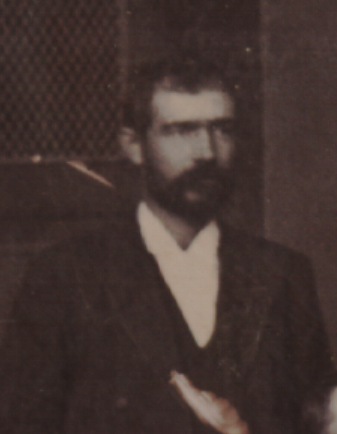
Du Toit in the Eerste Volksraad parliament, Pretoria.

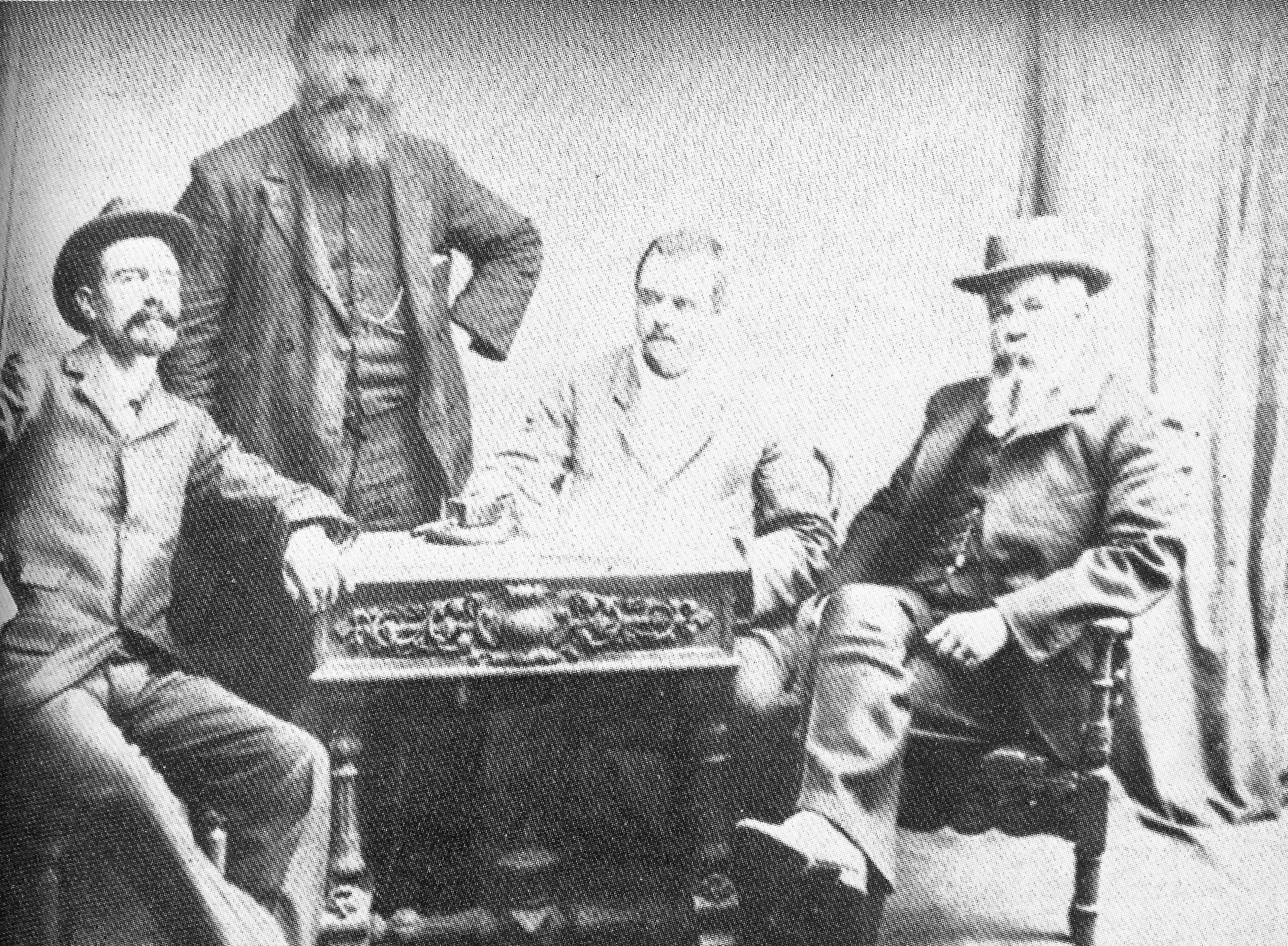
Du Toit (left) with his staff in the Second Boer War.

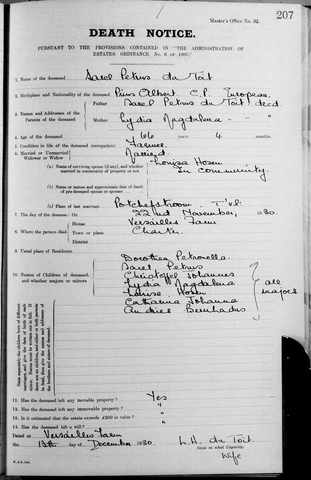
Death notice for Sarel Petrus du Toit, December 1930. The namesake son Sarel Petrus is not mentioned here.

Sarel Petrus du Toit (June 28, 1864 – November 22, 1930) was a Second Boer War Boer general for the South African Republic. In 1896 he was elected representative to the Eerste Volksraad in Pretoria for the district of Wolmaransstad.

== Family ==
Sarel was the eldest of seven children of Sarel Petrus Johannes du Toit (Beaufort West, Cape Province, 14 May 1839 – Potchefstroom, Southern DC, NW, 10 November 1929) and Lydia Magdalena Cordier (Kaap de Goede Hoop, 1843 – Potchefstroom, Transvaal, 9 November 1888). He married Louisa Hosea Jordaan (Orange Free State, around 22 December 1865 – Enkeldoorn (Chivhu), Southern Rhodesia, 27 March 1934), and had four daughters and four sons by her.

== Second Boer War ==
At the outbreak of the Second Boer War du Toit joined the Boer troops at Polfontein on 9 Oktober 1899 and was soon appointed by general Piet Cronjé as an assistant general for the districts of Wolmaransstad, Bloemhof and Lichtenburg.

=== Siege of Kimberley ===
With general de la Rey he went from Vrijburg to Kimberley, where he was ordered to take the command of the Siege. On 25 November 1899 a British raid from Kimberley to create an opening for the oncoming troops of Lord Methuen failed. Boer military and besieged citizens had their last confrontation on 28 November 1899, whereafter Boers turned their attention to the advancing British army of Methuen. On 7 December 1900 no more than 1500 Free Staters were left around Kimberley, under the command of General du Toit. By 17 March 1900 du Toit had a large force north of Kimberley. He complained about the lack of a proper canon to attack Kimberley, and received a Long Tom. Naas Ferreira and Du Toit agreed to the proposal of the French volunteer general George de Villebois-Mareuil to storm Kimberley, but this plan was not realised. When the cavalry of British major-general French finally arrived at Kimberley, the Free State military fled and Du Toit had to retreat rescuing the cannon.

=== After the relief of Kimberley, 25 February 1900 ===
Du Toit commanded generals Andries Petrus Johannes Cronjé, Jan Celliers, Potgieter, Piet Liebenberg of Griqualand and Sarel Oosthuizen of Krugersdorp at the Battle of Veertien Strome (Veertienstromen, 3–5 May 1900 near Warrenton). After the fall of Pretoria he fought at the Battle of Diamond Hill (Afrikaans: Slag van Donkerhoek) on 11 – 12 June 1900.

=== Guerilla phase ===
Du Toit fought many skirmishes with British troops, including battles at Hartebeestfontein, Lichtenburg, Makwassiebergen, Brakspruit (1 March 1902) up to the last engagement, the Battle of Rooiwal on 11 April 1902 near Klerksdorp in Western Transvaal.

=== Treaty of Vereeniging ===
Du Toit was a delegate for Wolmaransstad at the negotiations for the Treaty of Vereeniging, starting on 15 May 1902.

== Honours ==
Sarel du Toit was awarded the Dekoratie voor Trouwe Dienst, the so-called "Anglo-Boere Oorlog Medalje" (Anglo-Boer War Medal) by the Union of South Africa Government, together with 590 other Boer military officers from the Second Boer War.

== Literature ==
- A.E., Onze Krijgs-officieren. Album van portretten met levens-schetsen der Transvaalse Generaals en Kommandanten (Translated title: Our Military Officers. Album of portraits with life sketches of the Transvaal Generals and Commandants), Volksstem, Pretoria 1904. In Dutch with a preface by Louis Botha. PDF on Wikimedia Commons. Page 39.
- M. P. Bossenbroek, Yvette Rosenberg (Translator), The Boer War, Seven Stories Press, New York, NY, 2018. ISBN 9781609807474, 1609807472. General reference and page 191.
- J. H. Breytenbach, Die Geskiedenis van die Tweede Vryheidsoorlog in Suid-Afrika, 1899–1902, Die Staatsdrukker Pretoria, 1969–1996. In Afrikaans.
  - Breytenbach, J. H. (1971). Die eerste Britse offensief, Nov. – Des. 1899 [The first British offensive, Nov. – Dec. 1899]. Die Geskiedenis van die Tweede Vryheidsoorlog in Suid-Afrika, 1899–1902 (in Afrikaans). Vol. II. Pretoria: Die Staatsdrukker. Pages 381–382, 384–385, 388–389, 395–396, 398, and 404–405, foto no 19.
  - Breytenbach, J. H. (1977). Die Boereterugtog uit Kaapland [The Boer retreat from the Cape Colony]. Die Geskiedenis van die Tweede Vryheidsoorlog in Suid-Afrika, 1899–1902 (in Afrikaans). Vol. IV. Pretoria: Die Staatsdrukker. Pages 81, 195, 197, 205, 210, 218–220, 222–227, 238, 247, 251, 264, 268, 275, 278, 287, 340, 371, 374, and 488.
  - Breytenbach, J. H. (1983). Die Britse Opmars tot in Pretoria [The British advance to Pretoria]. Die Geskiedenis van die Tweede Vryheidsoorlog in Suid-Afrika, 1899–1902 (in Afrikaans). Vol. V. Pretoria: Die Staatsdrukker. ISBN 9780621083606. OCLC 769254652. Pages 15–16, 29, 31, 36–37, 166, 327–348, 351–358, 381, 384–391, 394, 412, 488–497, 520, 524, 527, 544, and 553.
  - Breytenbach, J. H. (1996). Die beleg van Mafeking tot met die Slag van Bergendal [The siege of Mafeking up to the Battle of Bergendal]. Die Geskiedenis van die Tweede Vryheidsoorlog in Suid-Afrika, 1899–1902 (in Afrikaans). Vol. VI. Pretoria: Die Staatsdrukker. ISBN 9780797033214. OCLC 813492747. Pages 52, 54,175, 199, and 242.
- Du Preez SJ (1977). "Du Toit, Sarel Petrus". In Krüger DW, Beyers CJ (eds.). Dictionary of South African Biography Vol III (1st ed.). Cape Town: Tafelberg-Uitgewers. p. 259. ISBN 0624008495. OCLC 1063845175.
- Pakenham, Thomas (1992). The Boer War. London: Abacus. ISBN 0-349-10466-2. General reference and p. 379.
