= List of battles in South Africa =

List of battles in South Africa is a list of all military conflicts, wars or battles fought within the borders of South Africa.

== Khoikhoi–Dutch Wars (1659–1677) ==
- First Khoikhoi–Dutch War 1659–1660
- Second Khoikhoi–Dutch War 1673–1677

== Anglo-Dutch rivalry (1664–1804) ==
Bartolomeu Dias, a Portuguese navigator, discovered the Cape of Good Hope in 1488. The Dutch settlement in the area began in March 1647. A Dutch expedition of 90 Calvinist settlers, under the command of Jan van Riebeeck, founded the first permanent settlement near the Cape of Good Hope in 1652. Cape Colony established in 1652. 31 December 1687 a community of Huguenots arrived at the Cape from the Netherlands. See also Huguenots in South Africa.

- Occupation of Simon's Town by the British 14 June 1795
- Capture of Cape Town by the British 14–16 June 1795
- First Occupation of Cape Colony by the British 1795, relinquished control of the territory in 1803
- Second Occupation of Cape Colony by the British from 19 January 1806 until incorporated into the independent Union of South Africa in 1910

== Cape of Good Hope War (Cape Colony) ==
- Battle of Muizenberg 1795
- Battle of Blaauwberg, also known as the Battle of Cape Town 8 January 1806

== Xhosa Wars ==
Also known as the Kaffir Wars or Cape Frontier Wars or Dispossession Wars

- First war (1779–81)
- Second war (1789–93)
- Third war (1799–1803)
- Fourth War (1811–12)
- Fifth War (1818–19)
- Sixth War (1834–36)
- Seventh War (1846–1847)
- Eighth War (1850–53)
- Cattle Killings (1856–58)
- Ninth War, Ngcayechibi's War or Fengu-Gcaleka War (1877–79)

== Ndwandwe–Zulu War (1817–19) ==
Also known as the Zulu Civil War. The fallout from this war led to the catastrophe known as the Mfecane (Difaqane, Lifaqane, Mfeqane).

- Battle of Gqokli Hill (1818)
- Battle of Mhlatuze River (1819)

== Battles between the Voortrekkers and Ndebele (1836–1837) ==
- Voortrekkers under Andries Potgieter defeat the Ndebele at the Battle of Vegkop 1836
- Voortrekkers under Andries Potgieter, Piet Uys and Gerrit Maritz, helped by Rolong and Griqua tribes, defeat Ndebele at Mosega 17 January 1837

== Battles between the Voortrekkers and the Zulu (1838–40) ==
- Battle of Italeni 9 April 1838
- Battle of Blood River 16 December 1838
- Battle of Maqongqe January 1840

== Anglo-Pedi Wars (1876–1879) ==
- Wars of Resistance (1838)
- Sekhukhune Wars (1876–1879)

== Natal (1842–1843) ==
- Battle of Congella 1842

== Transorangia (1845–1848) ==
- Battle of Zwartkoppies between local Boer farmers and the Griqua people 1845
- Battle of Boomplaats 1848

== South African Republic (1854–1877) ==
- The Boers defeat the Ndebele under chief Makopane at Makapansgat 1854
- Campaign against Batlhaping (Batlapin) Bantu people under Gasibone and Mahura in West Transvaal 1858
- Campaign against Bampelas in North Transvaal 1858
- Campaign against Mabhogo and Maleo 1863
- Campaign against people of Katlagter, Makopane, Mapela and Matshem 1865–1868
- Campaign against Bantu chief Sekhukhune (Afrikaans: Sekoekoeni) 1876–1877

== Zulu Succession (1856) ==
- Battle of Ndondakusuka 2 December 1856

== Free State–Basotho Wars (1858–1868) ==
- Senekal's War 1858
- Seqiti War which included two conflicts, in 1865−1866 and 1867−1868

== Koranna War (1868) ==
- The Koranna War breaks out along the Orange River. 1868

== Anglo-Zulu War (11 January – 4 July 1879) ==
- Battle of Isandlwana 22 January 1879
- Battle of Rorke's Drift 22–23 January 1879
- Battle of Intombe (also Intombi or Intombi River Drift) 12 March 1879
- Battle of Hlobane 28 March 1879
- Battle of Kambula 29 March 1879
- Battle of Gingindlovu (uMgungundlovu) 2 April 1879
- Siege of Eshowe 22 January – 3 April 1879
- Battle of Ulundi 4 July 1879

== Basuto Rebellion ==
- Basuto Gun War between the British Cape Colony and the Sotho people 13 September 1880 – 29 April 1881

== First Boer War (16 December 1880 – 23 March 1881) ==
The British recognised the two Boer Republics in 1852 (Sand River Convention) and 1854 (Orange River Convention, or Bloemfontein Convention), but the annexation of the Transvaal in 1877 led to the First Boer War in 1880 and 1881. After British defeats, most heavily at the Battle of Majuba Hill, Transvaal independence was restored subject to certain conditions, but relations were uneasy.

- Action at Bronkhorstspruit 20 December 1880
- Battle of Laing's Nek 28 January 1881
- Battle of Rooihuiskraal 12 February 1881
- Battle of Schuinshoogte also known as Ingogo 8 February 1881
- Battle of Majuba Hill 27 February 1881

== Between the two Boer Wars ==
- Wars of the South African Republic (Transvaal) with black peoples:
  - Campaign against Mampoer (Mampuru) and Mabhogo 1882–1883
  - Campaign against Oesibeboe 1884
  - Campaign against Massouw and Moshette 1885–1886
  - Campaign against Masalanabo Modjadji of the Balobedu 1890–1891
  - Malaboch War 1894
  - Campaign against Chief Makgoba (Magoeba) 1895
  - Campaign against Bantu chief M'pefu (Mpefu) of the Venda people, 1898
- Jameson Raid (British-Boer conflict) 29 December 1895 – 2 January 1896
- Second Matabele War (British-Matabele conflict) also known as the Matabeleland Rebellion March 1896 – October 1897

== Second Boer War (11 October 1899 – 31 May 1902) ==
between the British Empire and the two independent Boer republics of the South African Republic (Transvaal Republic) and the Orange Free State.

=== 1899 ===
- Battle of Kraaipan (Afrikaans: Geveg by Kraaipan )12 October 1899
- Siege of Kimberley (Beleg van Kimberley) 14 October 1899 – 15 February 1900
- Battle of Talana Hill also known as Battle of Glencoe (Slag van Talana) 20 October 1899
- Battle of Elandslaagte (Slag van Elandslaagte) 21 October 1899
- Battle of Ladysmith / Battle of Nicholsonsnek (Slag by Nicholsonsnek) 30 October 1899
- Battle of Modderspruit near Ladysmith 30 October 1899
- Battle of Alexanderfontein (Slag van Alexanderfontein) near Kimberley 18 November 1900
- Battle of Belmont (1899) (Slag van Belmont) 23 November 1899
- Battle of Willow Grange (Slag by Willowgrange) 23 November 1899
- Battle of Graspan (Slag by Graspan) 25 November 1899
- Battle of Modder River (Slag van (die) Tweeriviere) 28 November 1899
- Siege of Ladysmith (Beleg van Ladysmith, Slag by Platrand) between 30 October 1899 and 28 February 1900
- Relief of Ladysmith
- Battle of Stormberg (Slag by Stormberg) 10 December 1899
- Battle of Magersfontein (Battle of Scholtznek, Slag by/van Magersfontein) 11 December 1899
- Black Week 10–17 December 1899
- Battle of Colenso (Slag by/van Colenso) 15 December 1899

=== 1900 ===
- Battle of Sunnyside 1 January 1900
- Battle of Spion Kop (Slag van Spioenkop) 23–24 January 1900
- Battle of Vaal Krantz (Slag by Vaalkrans) 5–7 February 1900
- Battle of the Tugela Heights (or Thukela, Afrikaans: Slag van Pietershoogte) 14–27 February 1900
- Battle of Paardeberg (Slag van Paardeberg/Perdeberg) 18–27 February 1900
- Bloody Sunday (1900) 18 February 1900
- Siege of Mafeking over a period of 217 days, from October 1899 to May 1900
- Battle of Poplar Grove (Slag van Modderrivierpoort), 7 March 1900
- Battle of Driefontein/Battle of Abrahamskraal (Slag van Abrahamskraal), 10 March 1900
- Battle of Brandfort 25 March 1900
- Battle of Sanna's Post (aka Korn Spruit, Slag van Sannaspos) 31 March 1900
- Battle of Doornbult, Lichtenburg, North West 31 March 1900
- Battle of Reddersburg 4 April 1900
- Siege of Wepener 10 April 1900
- Battle of Veertien Strome (Veertienstrome/Fourteen Streams near Warrenton) 3-5 May 1900
- Battle of Sand River (Slag aan Sandrivier) 10 May 1900
- Battle of Lindley 31 May 1900
- Battle of Roodewalstasie 7 June 1900
- Battle of Alleman's Nek (Almond's Nek), west of Volksrust 11 June 1900
- Battle of Diamond Hill (Donkerhoek) 11–12 June 1900
- Battle of Silkaatsnek 11 July 1900
- Battle of Dwarsvlei 11 July 1900
- Battle of Onderstepoort 11 July 1900
- Second Battle of Silkaatsnek 2 August 1900
- Battle of Elands River (1900) 4–16 August 1900
- Battle of Vaalhoogte 20 August 1900
- Battle of Bergendal (also known as the Battle of Belfast) 27 August 1900
- Battle of Bothaville (Doornkraal) 6 November 1900
- Battle of Leliefontein (also known as the Battle of Witkloof) 7 November 1900
- Battle of Dewetsdorp 19 November 1900
- Battle of Renosterkop 19 November 1900
- Battle of Modder River 28 November 1900
- Battle of Nooitgedacht 13 December 1900
- Battle of Helvetia 29 December 1900
- Battle of Langberg 31 December 1900

=== 1901 ===
- Battle of Lake Chrissie (Chrissiesmeer), 6 February 1901
- Battle of Welgevonden, Winburg 26 May 1901
- Battle of Vlakfontein 29 May 1901
- Battle of Rheeboksfontein ("Rheboksfontein"), Vredefort, 17 August 1901
- Battle of Groenkloof 5 September 1901
- Battle of Elands River (1901) or Modderfontein 17 September 1901
- Battle of Blood River Poort or Scheeper's Nek 17 September 1901
- Battle of Bakenlaagte 30 October 1901
- Battle of Groenkop (Battle of Tweefontein) 25 December 1901

=== 1902 ===
- Battle of Ysterspruit, west of Klerksdorp 25 February 1902
- Battle of Schaapkraal, Harrismith, 4 March 1902
- Battle of Tweebosch or De Klipdrift 7 March 1902
- Battle of Hart's River (Bosbult) 31 March 1902
- Battle of Rooiwal 11 April 1902

== First World War (1914–1918) ==
- South West Africa campaign, including the ousting of occupying German troops from Walvis Bay (Walvisbaai) in 1915 by the South African Union Defence Force, 1914–1915.
- Maritz rebellion 15 September 1914 – 4 February 1915
- Battle of Kakamas 4 February 1915

== See also ==
- Military history of South Africa
- List of conflicts in Africa
