= Johannes Lötter =

Boer commander

Johannes Cornelius Jacobus Lötter
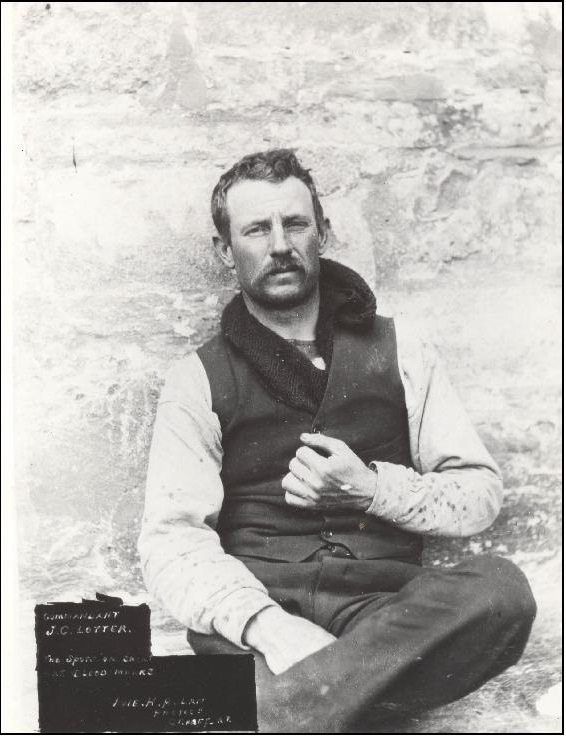
- Commandant Lötter in Graaff-Reinet prison
- Born: January 15, 1875; Pearston, Cape Colony
- Died: October 12, 1901 (aged 26); Middelburg, Cape Colony
- Cause of death: Execution by firing squad
- Relatives: Michiel Petrus Lötter (father), Maria Catharina Buys (mother); Christoffel Lötter (2nd Great-Grandfather)
- Military career
- Allegiance: (Orange Free State) Boer Republics
- Service years: 1899 – 1901
- Rank: Commandant
- Nickname: Hans
- Unit: Lötter Rebels
- Commands: Lötter Rebels
- Conflicts: Battle of Groenkloof

Johannes Cornelius Jacobus "Hans" Lötter (January 15, 1875 – October 12, 1901) was a Boer commander who fought, and was executed as a war criminal by the British during the Second Boer War. Along with Gideon Scheepers, Lötter was one of the most brutal guerrilla commandos in the Cape Colony.

Lötter entered the Cape Colony during the war along with Pieter Hendrik Kritzinger. Lötter's Boer Commando earned a reputation for being brutal and undisciplined. Like many Boer commandants, Lötter promulgated public decrees to the residents of the Cape Colony, warning of harsh retribution if they did not support the forces of the Boer Republics. A column led by Henry Jenner Scobell was tasked with tracking down Lötter's commando. They tracked the commando to Groenkloof, west of Cradock, and surprised them with a dawn attack. Sixty of Lötter's men became casualties and sixty, including Lötter, were captured.

He was taken to Graaff-Reinet for his trial, and charged with treason, murdering unarmed British scouts, flogging two Afrikaners who had brought him terms of surrender, destroying railway lines, and marauding. The trial was straightforward since Lötter was a citizen of the British-controlled Cape Colony and therefore a rebel. He was found guilty, sentenced to death by firing squad, executed along with seven of his men on October 12, 1901.
