= Battle of Dwarsvlei =

Battle of the Second Boer War

Battle of Dwarsvlei / Action at Onrust
- Part of Second Boer War
Date	11 July 1900
Location	Krugersdorp district, Gauteng, South Africa
Result	Boer victory

Belligerents
United Kingdom	South African Republic; Orange Free State

Commanders and leaders
Horace Smith-Dorrien	Sarel Oosthuizen

Strength
1,335, a Colt Gun, two Guns of the 78th Battery, three Ambulances and forty Wagons	150

The Battle of Dwarsvlei (Afrikaans: Slag van Dwarsvlei, Action at Onrust) in the Second Boer War (1899–1902) was fought by Boer and British forces on 11 July 1900 in the district of Krugersdorp, South African Republic. The action at Dwarsvlei was part of Koos de la Rey's new guerrilla strategy and coincided with the battles at Silkaatsnek and Onderstepoort on the same day of 11 July 1900.

== Battle ==
The 150 strong Boers, mainly Krugersdorp Commando under General Sarel Oosthuizen (known as "Rooibul", the Red Bull of Krugersdorp, because of his red beard) ambushed British troops of the 1st Gordon Highlanders and the King's Shropshire Light Infantry under Major general Horace Smith-Dorrien on Oosthuizen's own farm. The Boers were armed with a variety of rifles such as Mausers, Lee-Metfords, Martini-Henry's and Guedes Model 1885.

They attacked the British convoy on its way from Krugersdorp in the south to Hekpoort in the north from high ground positions – marked Z on Smith-Dorrien's map shown on this page – on the Witwatersberg mountain range ridge overlooking an intersection on the Krugersdorp-Hekpoort road.

The battle raged all day and at dusk Oosthuizen was seriously wounded when he tried in vain to capture the English cannons, with only a few burghers. He died from his wounds on 14 August 1900. The British withdrew while the Boers were too weak to follow up.

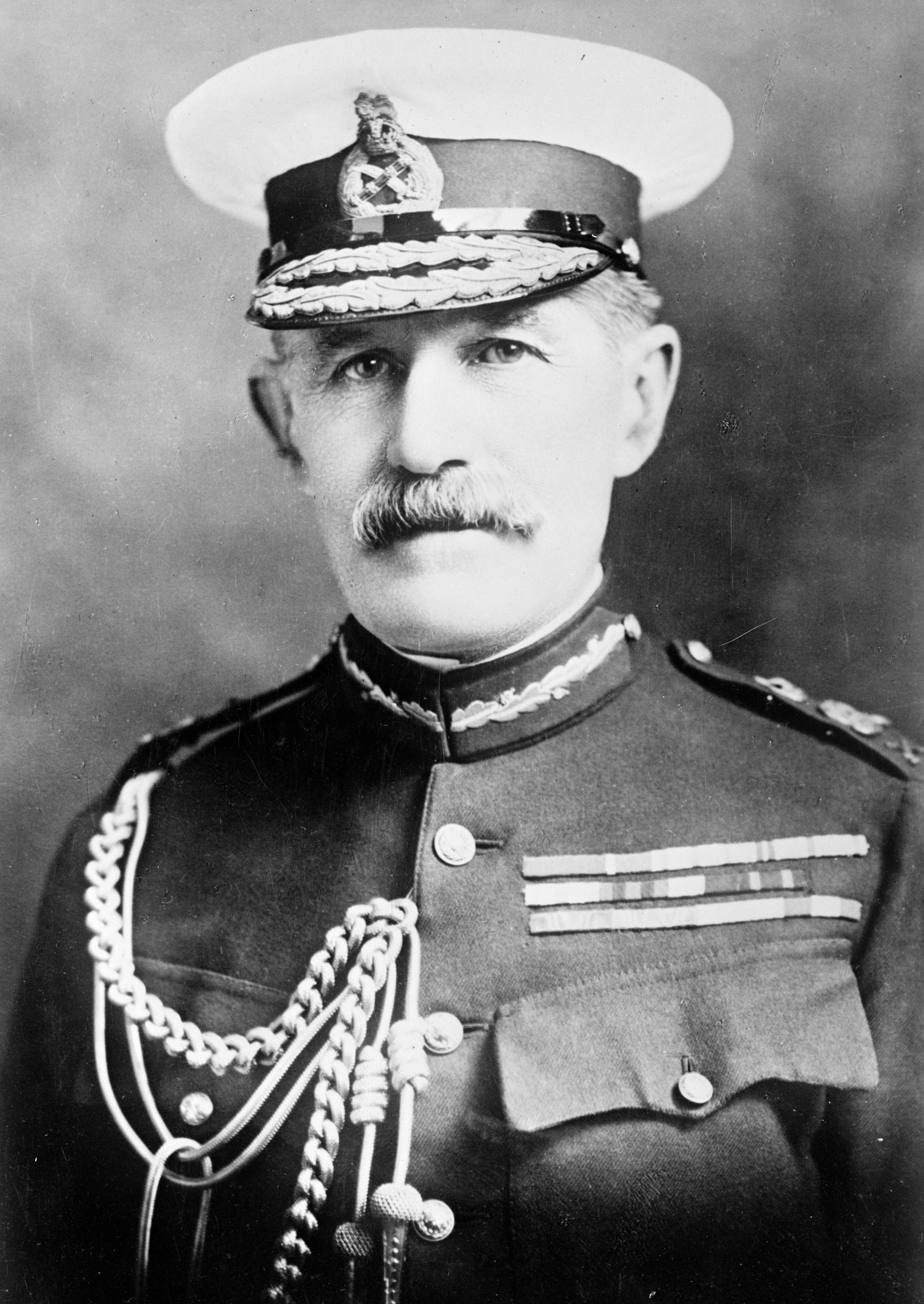
British general Horace Lockwood Smith-Dorrien (1858–1930).

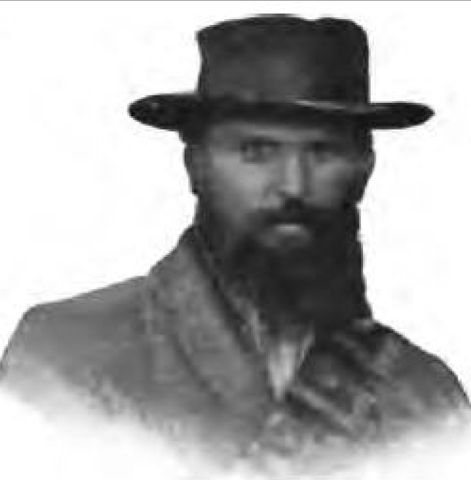
Boer general Sarel Francois Oosthuizen (1862–1900)

== See also ==
- List of battles in South Africa
