= De Wet =

De Wet is the name of:

- Jacob Willemszoon de Wet (c. 1610 – between 1675 and 1691), Dutch painter
- Christiaan de Wet (1854–1922), Boer general, rebel leader and politician
  - De Wet Decoration, South African military medal named after the above
- Piet de Wet (1861–1929), Boer general, brother of Christiaan de Wet
- Nicolaas Jacobus de Wet (1873–1960), Chief Justice of South Africa and acting Governor-General
- Andries de Wet (1876–1930), Boer leader and soldier
- Quartus de Wet (1899–1980), son of the above, South African judge and judge-president of the Transvaal, and presiding judge of the 1963 Rivonia Trial, where he sentenced Nelson Mandela and other anti-apartheid activists to life imprisonment.
- Johannes Christiaan de Wet (1912–1990), South African jurist
- De Wet Barry (born 1978), South African rugby union footballer
- Friedel de Wet (born 1980), South African cricketer
- Jane de Wet (born 1996), South African actress
