= Harry Scobell =

British general (1859–1912)

Major-General Sir Harry Scobell KCVO CB
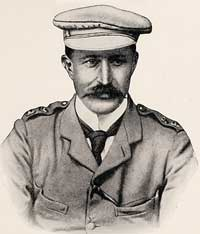
- Born: 2 January 1859; Saint George, Hanover Square, London, England
- Died: 2 February 1912 (aged 53); Rondebosch, Cape Province, Union of South Africa
- Relatives: Harriet Mildred Willes-Johnston (wife)
- Military career
- Allegiance: United Kingdom
- Branch: British Army
- Service years: 1879–1912
- Rank: Major-General
- Nickname: Harry
- Unit: Scots Greys
- Commands: OC 5th Royal Irish Lancers; 2nd Dragoons (Royal Scots Greys); GOC, Cape of Good Hope District
- Conflicts: Battle of Groenkloof
- Awards: KCVO, CB, Queen's Medal (six clasps), King's Medal (two clasps)

Major-General Sir Henry Jenner Scobell, KCVO, CB (2 January 1859 – 1 February 1912) was a British Army officer who served as the last officer in command of Cape Colony before the formation of the Union of South Africa.

== Life and career ==
=== Education and early service with the Scots Greys ===
Scobell was born in Hanover Square, he was the son of Col. Henry Sales Scobell & his wife Catherine Sarah Jenner Bedford. His maternal great grandfather was Edward Jenner. After attending Eton College, rather than attend Sandhurst, Scobell obtained a commission as a second lieutenant in the Worcester Militia in 1878. In 1879, he obtained a transfer from the militia, joining the 2nd Dragoons (Royal Scots Greys).

Over the next ten years, he saw little active service, but Scobell achieved promotion to captain by 1886. In 1889, he was seconded from the Scots Greys to serve as the adjutant of the Royal Wiltshire Yeomanry. In 1896, Scobell would be promoted to major in the Scots Greys.

=== With the Scots Greys in South Africa ===
In 1899, Scobell deployed with his regiment to South Africa to fight in the Second Boer War. At the start of the war, Major Scobell commanded C Squadron. Initially, the regiment patrolled the area between the Orange and Modder rivers. With the start of Lord Roberts' offensive against the Boer Republics, Scobell saw his first action at the Battle of Paardeberg before participating in the relief of Kimberly.

Following the battle of Paarderberg, Scobell's squadron captured a strategic hill east of Bloemfontein. With 65 men, Scobell rode 35 miles, forcing his way past the Boer commandos defending the rail line in order to seize the heights. Through the night, Scobbell's men held the hill despite being outnumbered by Boer commandos.

Scobell's squadron was left at Utival (also known as Zilikats Nek). There they were eventually joined by five companies from the 2nd battalion, the Lincolnshire Regiment, with a section of guns from O Battery, RHA. While Scobell had kept a strong picket line out to watch for Boer commandos, this was changed when he was superseded as the commander of the garrison. Under the command of an infantry colonel, the picket outposts were decreased. This allowed the outpost to be attacked unnoticed by a force of Boer commandos on 10 July 1900. Most of the squadron was captured during the disaster which ensued. The defeat allowed the Boers to hold Zilikats Nek. Scobell was able to escape with part of his command, having to shoot their way through the Boer commandos

After nearly dying in the battle at Zilikat's Nek in the Magaliesberg, he captured Barberton. A review of the action at Zilikats's Nek exonerated Scobell and he was given the local rank of lieutenant-colonel on 1 December 1900 and placed in command of the 1st Regiment, Brabant Horse. On 27 July 1901, Scobell was ordered to assume command of the 5th Royal Irish Lancers.

As part of the British effort to defeat the Boer insurgency, General French appointed Scobell to command a column of cavalry. Scobell's command including detachments from the 9th Lancers and the Cape Mounted Rifles. One of the most effective commandos operating in the Cape Province was the band commanded by Commandant Lötter. In the midst of a six-day mission, Scobell received information that Lötter's commando was laagered near the town of Petersburg in a gorge called Groenkloof. Quickly acting on the new intelligence, Scobell's column surprised Lötter's commando at the Battle of Groenkloof on 5 September 1901. In exchange for 10 dead troopers, Scobell's column killed 13, wounded 46 and captured the rest of Lötter's command, effectively destroying one of the most successful Boer units operating in the Cape. In recognition of his success, Scobell was granted the brevet rank of colonel.

For his service in the war, Scobell received the Queen's South Africa Medal (with six clasps), the King's South Africa Medal (with two clasps), and was mentioned in despatches several times (including by Lord Roberts on 31 March 1900, and by Lord Kitchener on 23 June 1902).

=== Post-war service ===
With the end of the war approaching, Scobell returned to London on board the steamer Plassy in February 1902, and was received in audience by King Edward VII at Buckingham Palace the following May. His brevet rank was confirmed and he was transferred back to his old regiment, the Scots Greys, as its commander on 2 August 1902, and went back to South Africa where they were stationed. His stay this time was brief, however, and he return in the steamship Saxon in February 1903, arriving in the United Kingdom to be appointed in command of the 1st Cavalry Brigade based at Aldershot on 1 April 1903, with the temporary rank of Brigadier-General. Promoted to Major-General on 1 October 1903, he was appointed Inspector of cavalry in May 1907. From 1909, he commanded the British garrison in South Africa. His final posting was as General Officer Commanding Cape District, the position he held until 1911. He was appointed a Knight Commander of the Royal Victorian Order (KCVO) on 7 November 1910, on the occasion of the visit of the Duke of Connaught to South Africa for the opening of the first Parliament of the Union.

From 1908 to his death he was colonel of the 5th Royal Irish Lancers. He died in Rondebosch in 1912.
