= Frederik Jacobus Potgieter =

Boer War commander

General Frederik Jacobus Potgieter
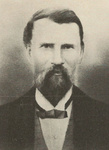

Personal details
- Born: 22 April 1858 Haartebeesfontein, South African Republic
- Died: 7 June 1924 (aged 66) Krugersdorp, Union of South Africa

Military service
- Allegiance: South African Republic
- Rank: Kommandant
- Commands: Krugersdorp Commando
- Battles/wars: Jameson Raid; First Boer War; Malaboch War; Second Boer War: Battle of Willowgrange; Battle of the Tugela Heights

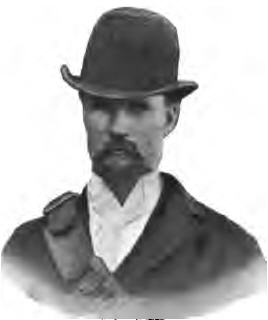
F.J. Potgieter, portrait from A.E., Onze Krijgs-officieren, Pretoria 1904.

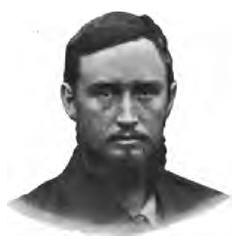
Commander Sarel Francois Alberts (1872 - 1954).

Frederik Jacobus Potgieter (Haartebeesfontein, Rustenburg, South African Republic, 22 April 1858 – Krugersdorp, West Rand, Gauteng, 7 June 1924) was a Boer commander in the Second Boer War (1899 – 1902). He is also referred to as Frederik Johannes Potgieter.

== Family ==
Potgieter was the fourth son of Hermanus Philippus Potgieter (Cradock, Eastern Cape, in the Stormberg District, Eastern Cape, South Africa, 12 June 1822 – Tweerivieren, Rustenburg, Bojanala, North West, South Africa, 14 July 1897) and Jannetje Lavina Catharina Francina Kruger (Vioolsberg, Colesberg, Bo-Karoo, Northern Cape, South Africa, 7 July 1823 – Rustenberg, Transvaal Republic, South Africa, 29 September 1873), who had eight sons and three daughters.

Frederik Jacobus's elder brother Gert Johannes (1849 – 1881) died at Amajuba, Natal in the Battle of Laing's Nek on 28 January 1881 during the First Boer War. Their widowed father married a second time, to Hester Maria Christina Janse van Rensburg (1853 – 1914). Frederik Jacobus Potgieter also married twice, first with Aletta Margaretha Francina Kloppers (Plaas Kameeldrift, Rustenburg, Bojanala, North West, 29 September 1860 – Hekpoort, Krugersdorp, Gauteng, 10 July 1899) and had at least twelve children by her. His second wife was Susanna Catharina van den Berg (Ladysmith, Natal, around 1862 – 'Nooitgedacht', Krugersdorp, Transvaal, 3 October 1925).

== Military career ==
From the age of sixteen, when Potgieter became a conscripted citizen of the South African Republic (Transvaal), he was in active service in wars against neighbouring native peoples (Dutch: naturellen-oorlogen) and as a soldier took part in the entire First Boer War (1880 – 1881). In 1895 he was appointed Commander for the district of Krugersdorp.

Six days after he was sworn in he was summoned by telegram to put down the Jameson Raid, an incursion of British rebels into the South African Republic. Among Potgieter's men in this successful action was the later Krugersdorp Commander and senator Sarel Francois Alberts (1872 – 1954). Afterwards Potgieter fought in the Malaboch War. After the outbreak of the Second Boer War in October 1899, Potgieter and his command joined general Lucas Johannes Meyer at Zandspruit, and were present in subsequent battles against the British troops. After general Hildyard's and Kitchener's troops occupied Brynbella Hill in the Battle of Willowgrange (near Estcourt, 23 November 1899), Potgieter and 2000-2500 of his men and Krugersdorp police stormed the top and drove the British off. Potgieter was seriously wounded in his breast at Hart's Hill (23-24 February 1900) during the two-week Battle of the Tugela Heights (14–27 February 1900, Afrikaans: Slag van Pietershoogte), and was inactived for eight months. After the death of general Sarel Oosthuizen J. L. van de Merwe acted as Commander (veldkornet) of the Krugersdorpers, who consulted Potgieter who although wounded remained with his troops.

In August 1900 Potgieter resumed his duties and served as a Commander on the western front under general Koos de la Rey, and in June 1901 he was appointed Landdrost (governor) of Krugersdorp District. In February 1902 he was finally captured by the British together with Commander Sarel Francois Alberts in Lichtenburg district: he was sent out as a prisoner of war to the island of Saint Helena, from where he was liberated after the Peace of Vereeniging.

== Literature ==
- Breytenbach, J. H. Die Geskiedenis van die Tweede Vryheidsoorlog in Suid-Afrika, 1899–1902 [The History of the Second Freedom War in South Africa, 1899-1902], Die Staatsdrukker Pretoria, 1969–1996. Six volumes in Afrikaans.
  - Breytenbach, J. H. (1969). Die Boere-offensief, Okt. – Nov. 1899 [The Boer Offensive, Oct. – Nov. 1899]. Die Geskiedenis van die Tweede Vryheidsoorlog in Suid-Afrika, 1899–1902 (in Afrikaans). Vol. I. Pretoria: Die Staatsdrukker. OCLC 798106662. Pages 379, 477–478.
  - Breytenbach, J. H. (1973). Die stryd in Natal, Jan. – Feb. 1900 [The battle in Natal, Jan. – Feb. 1900]. Die Geskiedenis van die Tweede Vryheidsoorlog in Suid-Afrika, 1899–1902 (in Afrikaans). Vol. III. Pretoria: Die Staatsdrukker. ISBN 9780797012394. OCLC 612581136. Pages 504, 524.
- Brits JP (1961). "Potgieter, Frederik Johannes". In Beyers CJ (ed.). Dictionary of South African Biography Vol IV (1st ed.). Durban and Pretoria: Butterworth & Co (SA). p. 471. ISBN 0409 09183 9. OCLC 1063845175.
