= Petrus Johannes Liebenberg =

Boer war general (1857–1950)

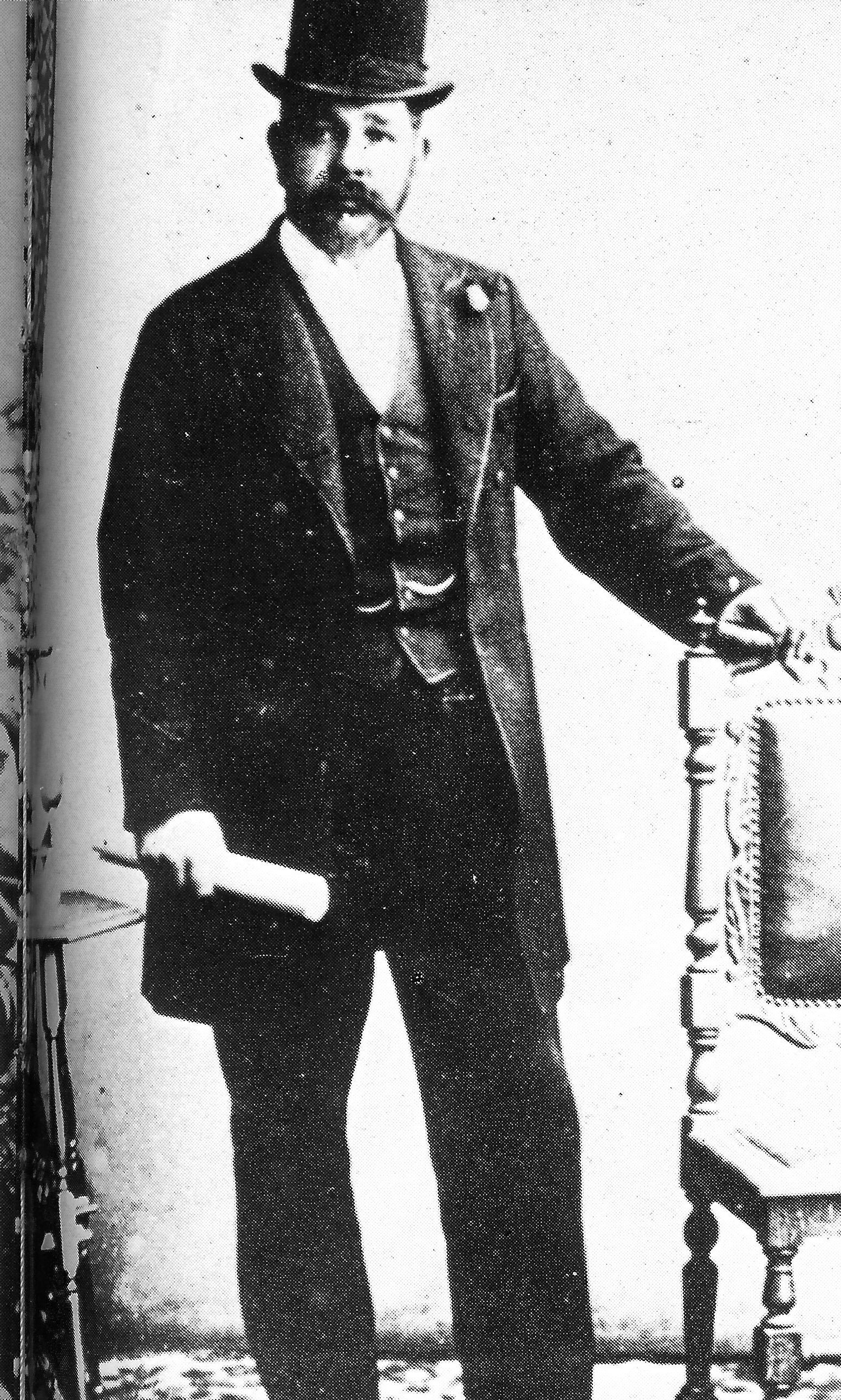
- Petrus Johannes Liebenberg (1857-1950), from Breytenbach 1983
- Born: September 29, 1857; Near Hoopstad
- Died: March 5, 1950 (aged 92)
- Military career
- Allegiance: Orange Free State
- Rank: Boer general
- Conflicts: First Boer War; Second Boer War; Battle of Kraaipan; Battle of Modder River; Battle of Magersfontein; Siege of Mafeking; Battle of Diamond Hill; Battle of Rooiwal

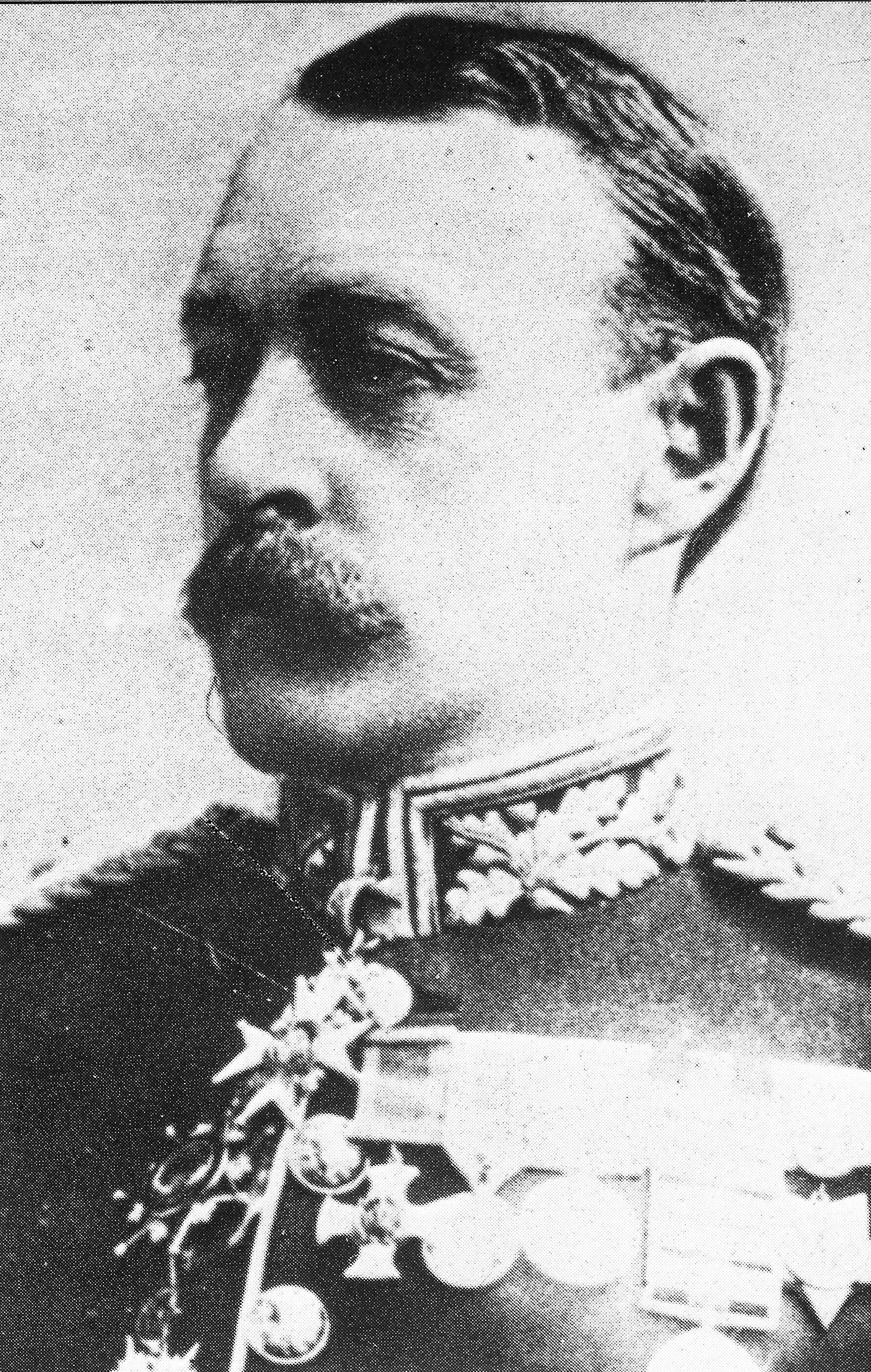
Archibald Hunter (1856 – 1936).

Petrus Johannes Liebenberg (Piet Liebenberg, 29 September 1857 – 5 March 1950) was a South African Boer politician for Potchefstroom and a general in the Anglo-Boer War (1899–1902). He successfully invaded the Cape Colony, failed to prevent the British relief of Mafeking, and fought to the end up to the Battle of Rooiwal. During the First World War Liebenberg criticised the policy of the Botha government to attack German South West Africa but did not condone the Maritz rebellion.

== Family and early years ==
Liebenberg was born near Hoopstad in Orange Free State to Christiaan Jacobus Liebenberg and Catharina Petronella van der Westhuizen. In 1874 he lived at the farm Witpoort in the district of Klerksdorp, South African Republic. Liebenberg took part in several military actions against neighbouring black peoples and fought in the First Boer War. In 1896 he represented the district of Potchefstroom in the Second Volksraad parliament.

== Second Boer War ==
After the outbreak of the Second Boer War Liebenberg served at the western front in the Battle of Kraaipan on 12 October 1899. Later he fought in the Battle of Modder River (Afrikaans: Slag van die Twee Riviere, 28 November 1899) and the Battle of Magersfontein (Slag van Magersfontein, 11 December 1899) and joined in the Siege of Mafeking (Beleg van Mafikeng, October 1899 – May 1900) as a commander. In January 1900 he was promoted to the rank of fighting general (veggeneraal).

=== Invasion of the Cape Colony ===
Liebenberg was ordered by general Piet Cronjé to invade the Cape Colony both to sabotage the railway Cape Town-De Aar-Bloemfontein-Pretoria near De Aar, which was vital for the invading British army of Lord Roberts, and to recruit Boer men in the British Cape Colony (Afrikaans: "nuwe burgers", new citizens, as "Cape rebels") to the cause of the two Boer Republics at war. He left Cronjé's army camp (laer) at Magersfontein at the end of January 1900 with some 200 men and two cannon. He was later joined by Commanders Koos Jooste and Andries de Wet, who had obtained permission from Transvaal president Paul Kruger for their plan to destroy the railway near De Aar.

Cape rebel Lucas Petrus Steenkamp (1845–1919) became the Assistant Chief Commander under general Liebenberg. Steenkamp had considered the recruitment of up to 6000 soldiers in the Cape Colony as the priority, before going south and cutting the railway and British lifeline between De Aar and Hopetown. On 15 February 1900, they occupied Prieska and environs in the Karoo, Northern Cape and declared it a part of the Orange Free State. Two days later, Cronjé sent an urgent message to now speedily attack the railway. Liebenberg recruited 200 men in Griekwastad on 28 February 1900 and chased away 500–700 British troops under Colonel Adye at the farm Houwater, some 40 kilometers north-west of Britstown.

However, Liebenberg received an erroneous order by his superior general Jacob Johannes Marthinus Breytenbach (around 1860–1901) to retreat from the Cape Colony, which he obeyed: as a result Prieska was recaptured by the British on 19 March 1900 and the Cape rebels were deserted by the invaders. Subsequently, Orange Free State president Marthinus Steyn fired Breytenbach on 31 March 1900. Nothing had come of the plan to destroy the railway near De Aar to help break the encirclement of Cronjé by Lord Roberts at Paardeberg.

=== Return to the Cape Colony ===
After the British occupation of Bloemfontein on 13 March 1900, the capital of Orange Free State, Liebenberg returned to Griqualand West and established his headquarters at Rooidam. General S. P. Du Toit reported on 12 April 1900 that Liebenberg was acting general for Griqualand West. In April 1900 Liebenberg was reinforced in North West Cape by the Krugersdorp Commando from Natal. British general Archibald Hunter forced him to retreat to the North in May 1900.

=== Failure to prevent the Relief of Mafeking ===
In May 1900 Liebenberg advanced from Fourteen Streams (Warrenton) with at first 300, but finally with 450 men to block 1149 British troops of Colonel B.T. Mahon, who came from Barkly West to relieve the besieged town of Mafeking. Liebenberg's force was composed of the Commandos from Bloemhof and Vryburg, reinforced by Louis Botha from Mafeking and others. He occupied a strong position on the ridge at the south bank of the Molopo River near Mafeking, while Boer burgers from Rustenburg en Marico protected the ridge on the north bank waiting for the unsuspecting troops of Mahon to pass in between. This plan was supervised by supreme general Koos de la Rey, who arrived at Mafeking on 14 May 1900. However, two horses on the north bank of the Molopo bolted under British cannon fire, leading the Rustenburg and Marico burgers there to retreat in a hurry. In the following night they left a gap between them through which Mahon could slip through. With his troops he entered Mafeking in the early hours of 17 May 1900 ending the 217-day siege.

=== Slag van Donkerhoek ===
After the Fall of Pretoria on 5 June 1900 Liebenberg was present at the meeting on the same day of more than 30 Boer commanders in the whiskey distillery of Lewis & Marks at Pienaarspoort, east of Pretoria. They decided to continue their struggle and defend the mountain ridge from Wonderboomspoort to Donkerhoek east of Pretoria. Liebenberg participated with his Griqualand troops in the lost Battle of Diamond Hill (Slag van Donkerhoek), where Louis Botha ordered a retreat to Bronkhorstspruit on 12 June 1900.

When president Kruger requested general De la Rey to start another invasion of the Cape Colony, he acquiesced on 2 July 1900 and would be accompanied by the generals Liebenberg, Du Toit, Snyman and Douthwaite for their strong resistance at Donkerhoek. Enthused by the Boer victory at Silkaatsnek near Hartbeespoort west of Pretoria on 11 July 1900 after months of defeats, Boer volunteers enlisted from West Transvaal. General De la Rey sent Liebenberg with a Krupp cannon and a pom-pom to command the Potchefstroom Commando on 14 July 1900.

=== Final actions ===
Generals Christiaan De Wet and Liebenberg combined their forces to a total of 1500 men and laid a siege around Frederikstad on 20 October 1900 but had to flee after five days when British reinforcements under Lt.-Col. H. T. Hicks arrived.

Liebenberg attacked Modderfontein together with general J.C. Smuts during January 29-31, 1901, and captured a British convoy, but they could not prevent general Methuen from reaching Klerksdorp in February 1901. With general Koos de la Rey Liebenberg failed to chase Col. C.G.C. Money out of Lichtenburg on March 3, 1901. However, on 25 February 1902 he successfully attacked a large British convoy at Ysterspruit west of Klerksdorp. In the last important battle of the Second Boer War at Rooiwal on April 11, 1902, Rawlinson forced Liebenberg to withdraw.

== Maritz rebellion ==
During the First World War Liebenberg criticised the policy of the Botha government in a number of public speeches but did not condone the Maritz rebellion.

== Decoration ==
The Union of South Africa Government awarded Liebenberg with 590 other Boer military officers from the Second Boer War in 1920 the Dekoratie Voor Trouwe Dienst, Anglo-Boeroorlog, 1899-1902 (D.T.D., translation: Decoration for Loyal Service), the so-called "Anglo-Boere Oorlog Medalje" (Anglo-Boer War Medal).

== Literature ==
- Breytenbach, J. H. Die Geskiedenis van die Tweede Vryheidsoorlog in Suid-Afrika, 1899–1902, Die Staatsdrukker Pretoria, 1969–1996. In Afrikaans.
  - volume IV. Die Boereterugtog uit Kaapland, Die Staatsdrukker Pretoria, 1977. Pages 126, 128–130, 141–142, 163, 195, 239, 432–434, 436–437, 439, 446, 458–459.
  - volume V. Die Britse Opmars tot in Pretoria, Die Staatsdrukker Pretoria, 1983. Pages 29, 319–327, 329, 331, 334, 336–349, 358–359, 363, 391, 444, 493, 552. Photo portrait after page 260.
  - volume VI. Die beleg van Mafeking tot met die Slag van Bergendal, Die Staatsdrukker Pretoria, 1996. Pages 53–58, 165, 175, 199, 242, 260.
- Brits JP (1977). "Liebenberg, Petrus Johannes". In Krüger DW, Beyers CJ (eds.). Dictionary of South African Biography Vol III (1st ed.). Cape Town: Tafelberg-Uitgewers. pp. 523–524. ISBN 0624008495. OCLC 1063845175.
- Hall, Darrell and Pretorius, Fransjohan, The Hall handbook of the Anglo-Boer War, 1899–1902, University of Natal Press, Pietermaritzburg, 1999. ISBN 0-86980-943-1. Page 137.
- Grobler, J.E.H., The War Reporter, Jonathan Ball Publishers. 2004. ISBN 978-1-86842-186-2. Pages 58, 60, 68, 90, 93, 95, 97, 107, 111, 137, 140–141.
