= Battle of Groenkloof =

1901 battle of the Second Boer War

- Part of Second Boer War
Date	5 September 1901
Location	Petersburg, Cape Colony 32°18′56″S 24°58′12″E
Result	British victory

Belligerents
United Kingdom	Boers from Cape Colony

Commanders and leaders
Colonel Harry Scobell	Commandant Johannes Lötter (executed)

Strength
1,100	130

Casualties and losses
10 killed, unknown number wounded	13 killed, 46 wounded, 61 captured

In the Battle of Groenkloof on 5 September 1901, a British column under Colonel Harry Scobell defeated and captured a small Boer commando led by Commandant Lötter in the Cape Colony during the Second Boer War.

== Background ==
While General Lord Kitchener struggled to suppress guerrilla warfare carried on by the Boers in the Orange Free State and the Transvaal, some Dutch settlers living in the Cape Colony also took up arms against the British. To combat the guerrilla war raging in the two Boer republics, Kitchener employed sweep-and-scour columns, farm burning and a policy of forcing Boer women and children into concentration camps.

However, using such harsh methods in the loyal Cape Colony was politically impossible. Instead, the British commander in the Cape Colony, General Sir John French resorted to a three-pronged strategy: first, to prevent Boer commandos from combining, second, to chase them constantly in order to prevent them from collecting new followers and supplies, and third, to tire them out so that they could be hunted down. One historian notes, "How simple an antidote to guerrilla warfare, compared with that immense operation of burning farms and carting off the whole civilian population of the countryside into the camps!"

== Battle ==
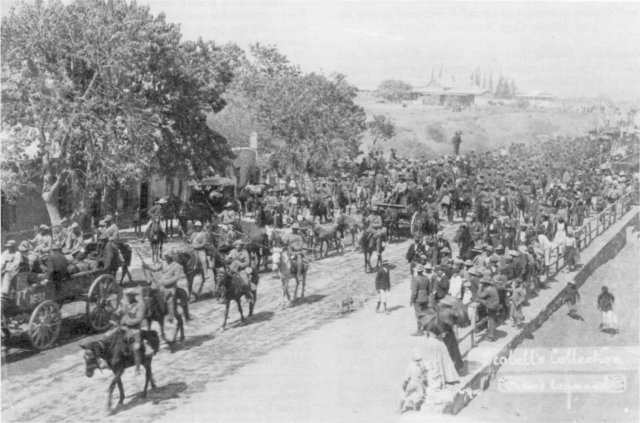
Lötter's commando being escorted into Graaff Reinet by the Coldstream Guards

Armed with information from French's excellent Field Intelligence Department and led by African Intelligence scouts, Scobell pursued Lötter's commando in the Tandjesburg mountains. Scobell, whose command included the 9th Lancers, the Cape Mounted Rifles and Imperial Yeomanry, was reputedly one of the most efficient British column commanders. On the fifth day of a six-day mission, the British officer found his quarry in a mountain gorge called Groenkloof, near the village of Petersburg. Believing that Lötter's men occupied a farm building, Scobell ordered a night march and deployed his 1100 soldiers on some ridges overlooking the farm. Actually, Lötter and his 130-man commando had taken shelter in a nearby 30-by-15 foot stone sheephouse or kraal, which was topped with a corrugated iron roof.

At dawn, a squadron of lancers was sent to investigate the kraal. The commanding officer, Lord Douglas Compton dropped his pistol near the entrance. As he dismounted to fetch his weapon, the Boers opened fire. Compton escaped, but the six men behind him were mowed down. Immediately, a thousand rifles opened up on the fearfully outnumbered Boers in the sheephouse.

After a half-hour of the unequal contest, the Boers surrendered. They suffered 13 killed and 46 wounded, while 61 unwounded survivors were hustled into captivity. Scobell's force lost 10 men killed. A British combatant said, "The sight was horrible in the extreme ... In fact the place was like a butcher's shop, some men making awful noises groaning clutching the ground and rolling in the dirt in their agony."

== Aftermath ==
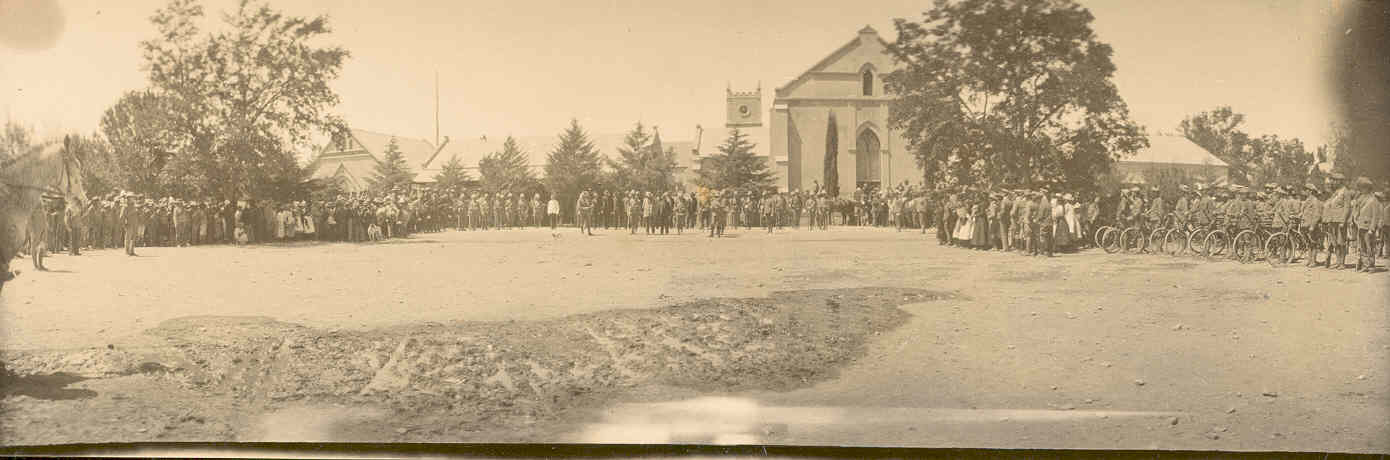
The death sentence is pronounced on Commandant Lötter at Middelburg, Cape

Lötter and seven others were later executed by the British authorities as rebellious subjects. Jan Smuts turned the tables on the British in the Battle of Elands River which followed ten days later. But as one historian points out, "In losing Lotter, the Boers had lost more than a tenth of the guerrillas in the Colony south of the Orange, and their élite commando at that ... the British Empire was a bottomless well, when it came to replacing lost troops."
