= Battle of Kraaipan =

1899 battle of the Second Boer War

- Part of Second Boer War
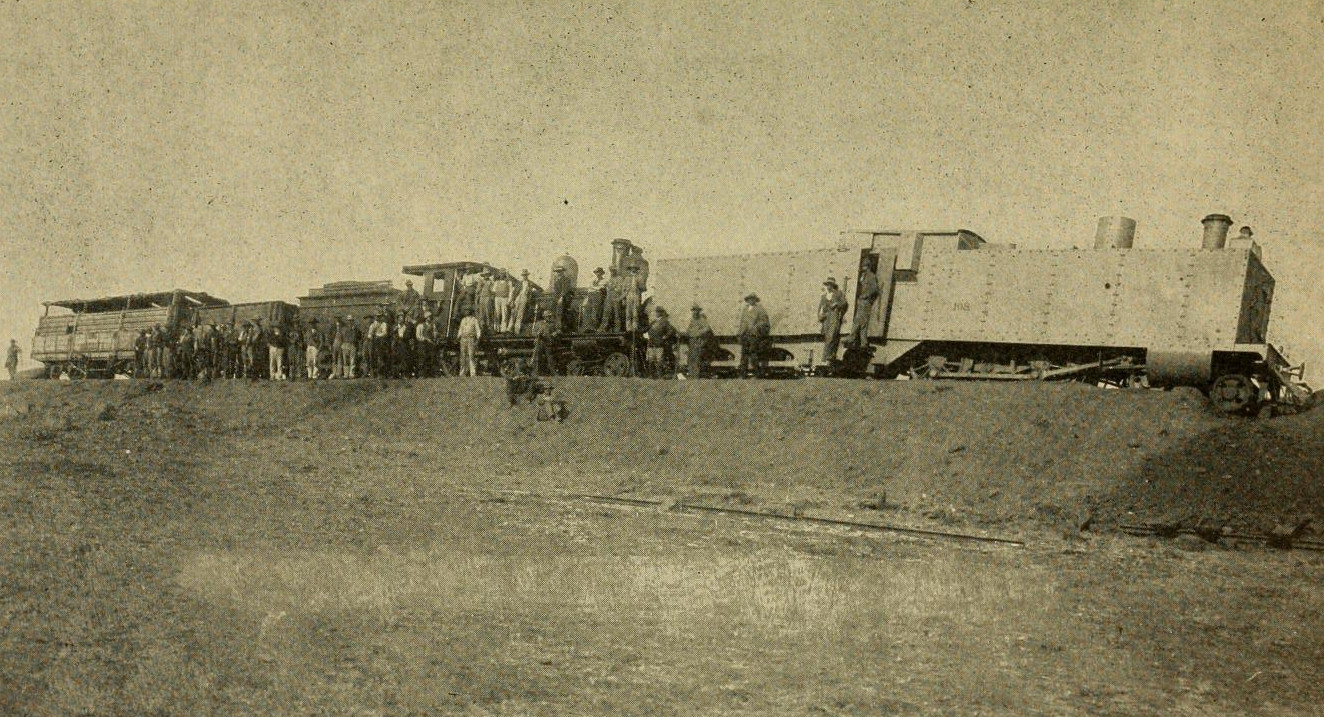
- Derailed armoured CGR 3rd Class 4-4-0 1889 at Kraaipan
Date	12–13 October 1899
Location	Kraaipan, South Africa 26°17′49″S 25°18′23″E
Result	Boer victory

Belligerents
United Kingdom	South African Republic; Orange Free State

Commanders and leaders
(United Kingdom of Great Britain and Ireland) Lt. RH Nesbitt	(South African Republic) Piet Cronjé (South African Republic) Koos de la Rey (Orange Free State) Petrus Liebenberg

Strength
Unknown	800

Casualties and losses
9 wounded	None

The Battle of Kraaipan was the first engagement of the Second Anglo-Boer War, fought at Kraaipan, South Africa on 12 October 1899.

On the 11 October 1899 President Paul Kruger of the South African Republic in alliance with the Orange Free State declared war on the British. That night 800 men of the Potchefstroom and Lichtenburg commandos under General Koos de la Rey (one of General Piet Cronjé's field generals) attacked and captured the British garrison and railway siding at Kraaipan between Vryburg and Mafeking, some 60 kilometres (37 mi) south west of Mafeking. Thus began the Second Anglo-Boer War. Under the orders of Cronjé the Mafeking railway and telegraph lines were cut on the same day.

The armoured train, "Mosquito", carrying two 7-pounder cannons, rifles, ammunition and supplies was derailed and after a five-hour fight the British surrendered the next morning. The cannons, rifles, ammunition, supplies and prisoners were taken. The Boer troops discovered British Mark IV ammunition (better known as dumdum) on the train.

This incident made De la Rey famous, but exacerbated his conflicts with the cautious and unimaginative Cronjé, who sent him to block the advance of the British forces moving to relieve the Siege of Kimberley in the north-east of the Cape Colony.
