= Christoffel Lötter =

- Born: Christoffel Lötter; 1744; Drakenstein, Paarl
- Died: 1825 (aged 80–81); Farm Blaaukrantz, Somerset-East
- Occupation: Farmer
- Spouse: Susanna Sophia Jacobs
- Children: 11
- Relatives: Casparus Jacobus Lötter

Christoffel Lötter was a Trekboer (Pioneer Farmer) in the Graaff-Reinet district during the British first annexation of the Cape in 1795, and was a representative of his community in the first negotiations between Graaff-Reinet leaders and Mr Frans Reinhard Bresler, who was sent by the British Commander General James Henry Craig.

== Lineage ==
Matthias Lötter, Gold- and Silversmith from Augsburg, Germany, arrived at the Cape in December 1733, aboard the van Alsem with other Dutch East India tradesmen and soldiers.

== Early life ==
Christoffel was born into a family of well-known master Gold and Silversmiths from Augsburg who had worked in Amsterdam during the Dutch Golden Age. Unlike his brothers, Johannes Casparus and Willem Godfried, who became Silversmiths at the Cape, Christoffel became a livestock farmer, trekking between the Cape and as far as Somerset East on the Cape Frontier.

== Family life ==
Christoffel and his wife of French Huguenot descent had 11 children.

== Military ==
Commando during First, Second and Third Xhosa wars.

== Government ==
When the British annexed the Cape in 1795, Lötter represented the community in negotiations for a peaceful takeover of the local government.
