= Krugersdorp Commando =

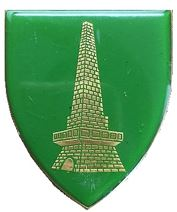
- Krugersdorp Commando emblem
- Country: South Africa
- Allegiance: South African Republic; Union of South Africa; Republic of South Africa; Republic of South Africa
- Branch: South African Army; South African Army
- Type: Infantry
- Role: Light infantry
- Size: One battalion
- Part of: South African Infantry Corps; South African Army Territorial Reserve
- Garrison/HQ: Krugersdorp
- Engagements: Second Boer War

Krugersdorp Commando or Kommando was a light infantry regiment from Krugersdorp district of the South African Army. It was active as a part of the South African Army Infantry Formation as well as the South African Territorial Reserve.

== Unit history ==
=== Origin ===
The Krugersdorp Commando, was formed in 1898 as part of the Boer Commando. Commanders from Krugersdorp were Sarel Oosthuizen, Frederik Jacobus Potgieter and Sarel Francois Alberts.

==== With the Zuid Afrikaanse Republiek ====
===== Anglo Boer War =====
During the Anglo Boer War, this commando was involved in the following engagements:

- rearguard for Dundee
- Battle of Elandslaagte
- Battle of Modderspruit
- Battle of Colenso capturing General Buller's artillery
- Battle for Pietershoogte

During the guerilla phase of the war in the Western Transvaal, this commando was also involved in:

- Battle of Vlakfontein
- Battle of Moedswil
- Battle of Driefontein
- Battle of Yzerspruit
- Battle of Tweebosch
- Battle of Boschbult and
- Battle of Rooiwal

The battle of Nooitgedacht in the Krugersdorp area could have been a complete rout had the Boers not stopped to plunder the British camp.

==== With the Union Defence Force (UDF) ====
By 1902 all Commando remnants were under British military control and disarmed.

By 1912, however previous Commando members could join shooting associations.

By 1940, such commandos were under control of the National Reserve of Volunteers.

These commandos were formally reactivated by 1948.

==== With the SADF ====
During this era, the unit was mainly engaged in area force protection, search and cordones and stock theft control assistance to the rural police.

The unit resorted under the command of the SADF's Group 17.

==== With the SANDF ====
===== Disbandment =====
Krugersdorp Commando along with all other Commando units was disbanded in the 1990s after a decision by South African President Thabo Mbeki to disband all existing Commando Units. The Commando system was phased out between 2003 and 2008 "because of the role it played in the apartheid era", according to the Minister of Safety and Security Charles Nqakula.

== Unit Insignia ==
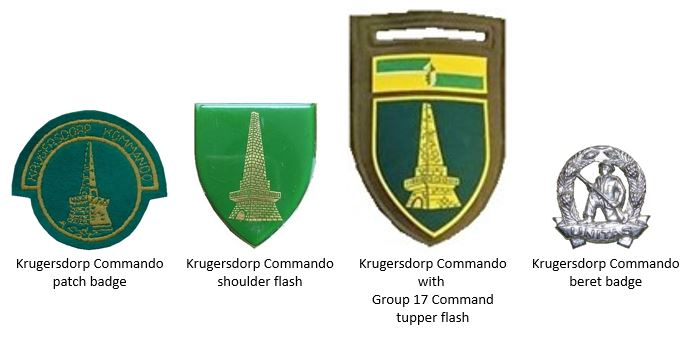
SADF era Krugersdorp Commando insignia

== Leadership ==
Leadership
From	Honorary Colonels	To	Ribbon
	No known incumbents		
From	Commanding Officers	To	Ribbon
1989	Lt Col Charles Betts MBE	2003	
From	Regimental Sergeants Major	To	Ribbon
	No known incumbents		

== See also ==
- South African Commando System
