= Potgieter =

Potgieter is a Germanic occupational surname, comparable with the English surname Potter.

Notable people with the surname include:

- Aldrich Potgieter (born 2004) South African golfer
- Bradley Potgieter (born 1989), South African racing cyclist
- Dewald Potgieter (born 1986), South African rugby player
- Everhardus Johannes Potgieter (1808–1875), Dutch poet and prose writer
- Ewart Potgieter (1932–1997), South African professional boxer
- Ferdinandus Jacobus Potgieter (1857–1902), Second Boer War Boer general
- Frederik Jacobus Potgieter (1858–1924), Second Boer War Boer commander.
- Frits Potgieter (born 1974) South African discus thrower
- Gert Potgieter (born 1937), South African athlete
- Gert Potgieter (1929–1977), South African opera tenor
- Hendrik Potgieter (1792–1852), South African politician
- Jacques Potgieter (born 1986), South African rugby player
- Jacques-Louis Potgieter (born 1984), South African rugby player
- Karel Potgieter (born 1975), South African shotputter
- Leah Potgieter, South African politician
- Louis Potgieter (1951–1993), South African ballet dancer and singer
- Ockert Potgieter (1965–2021) South African missionary and film director
- Pieter Johannes Potgieter (1822–1854), South African politician
- Yolandi Potgieter (born 1989), South African cricketer
