= Andries de Wet =

South African soldier

Andries Gerhardus de Wet (district of Carnarvon, Cape Colony, 5 July 1876 – Windhoek, South West Africa, 26 April 1930) was a South African soldier and founder of the Vrykorps in German South West Africa which tried to overthrow the British-aligned government of the Union of South Africa to establish German rule.

== Early life and education ==
De Wet was the son of the field cornet Pieter Gerhardus de Wet and his wife, Magdalena Judith Keet, and a cousin of General Christiaan de Wet (Pieter was the brother of Christiaan's father, Jacobus Ignatius de Wet). His education began at a farm school followed by primary school in Carnarvon, after which he studied with A. G. Visser at the Memorial School of the Huguenots in Dal Josafat, where they became close friends. After graduation, he returned to his hometown to farm, though according to one source, he was hired by the Cape Colony government at a young age as a plunge dip inspector of cattle.

== Second Boer War ==
In 1895, he moved to the South African Republic, where he and his friend Koos Jooste made a name for themselves as record-setting champion cyclists on the Pretoria-to-Cape-Town race. In September 1899, he and Jooste helped Daniel Theron establish his cyclist scout corps. In December 1899, once he was promoted to a lieutenant, De Wet was ordered by Theron at the head of 25 men to the front at Colesberg and from there to Stormberg, Northern Cape. De Wet and Jooste criticized the government for not stationing troops in Colesberg and advocated an expedition to the northwestern districts of the Cape to foment anti-colonial rebellion and thereby cut off the British connection to the South. Initially refusing his counsel, the SAR government eventually adopted his plan.

De Wet accompanied the expedition led by Gen. P. J. Liebenberg and Comm. Lucas Steenkamp, which set out by the end of January 1900. During February and March 1900, De Wet was active in organizing revolts in Prieska, Upington, and Kenhardt, and was promoted to commandant. The surrender of Gen.Piet Cronjé at Paardeberg on 27 February 1900, and the fall of Bloemfontein on 13 March 1900 obligated Republican forces to retreat quickly south of the Orange River. De Wet then helped defend the Orange Free State from British forces. He joined the Afrikaner Cavalry Corps when Comm. Abraham Malan founded it.

== Exile and return ==
With the dissolution of his unit, De Wet sailed for Europe out of Delagoa Bay. A serious surgery left him out of active service but he often spoke publicly about the war, championing a road through German South West Africa to help Boer representatives in Europe supply Boer troops in South Africa. By July 1901, he was well enough to return to the SAR with the help of its envoy, Willem Johannes Leyds. De Wet continued to function as the intermediary between Boer leadership at home and abroad. After a difficult trip through German South West Africa, he joined the commanders in the Cape in October 1901 and served on the staff of Gen. Jan Smuts, until a serious injury put him out of commission once more.

At the end of the war, refusing to submit to British authority, he fled with Gen. Manie Maritz, Com. (later Gen.) Edwin A. Conroy, Com. Jacob Petrus Neser, and High Com. Hendrik Lategan to German South West Africa. From there, they sailed out from Swakopmund on 30 July 1902. Hugging the west coast of Africa, they called port in Victoria, Kamerun (then another German colony, where they boarded another ship traveling via Las Palmas, Canary Islands, Madeira, and Southampton to Hamburg, where he received a hero's welcome on German soil on August 29. The party travelled by train to Berlin where they hoped to meet their heroes, generals Christiaan de Wet, Koos de la Rey, and Louis Botha on the latter's European tour. However, the latter Boer generals would only visit the German capital afterwards, and therefore the company went to the Netherlands where Neser rented them rooms with money borrowed from Cape loyalist Jan du Plessis. While in a hospital, De Wet began and soon completed a book on his wartime experiences. The sources are unclear as to whether this is the same as Die Buren in der Kapkolonie im Kriege mit England ("Neighbors in Cape Colony at War with England," published in Munich, which he wrote Van Doomik and Du Plessis.

De Wet, who accepted German citizenship, was already beginning to organize massive Boer settlement in German Southwest Africa. He had already negotiated with the German government for land where Boer refugees could live, but was stymied by lack of funds. In 1903, he returned to farm in South West Africa, still unwilling to live under the British flag, and became a leader in the local Afrikaner community.

== World War I ==
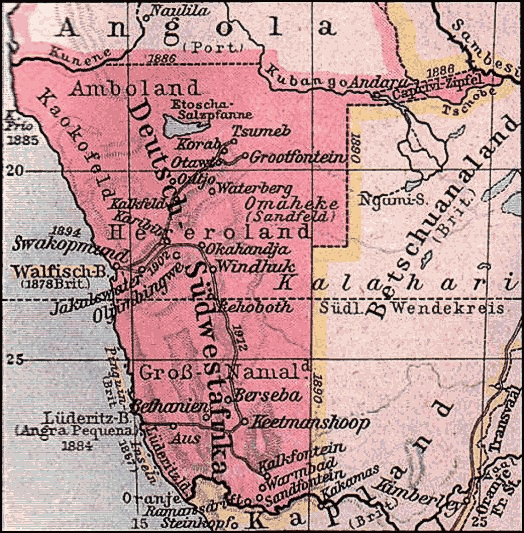
German South West Africa in 1904. De Wet started the Freikorps in Windhoek. Korab, where the German troops surrendered to the Union Defense Force, is also indicated on the map.

With the outbreak of World War I, De Wet enlisted in the Freikorps on 9 September 1914 in Windhoek, hoping among other things to free his homeland South Africa from British rule. Although the local Freikorps were short-lived, there was no comparable unit in any other German colonies. The all-volunteer corps was recruited from the already large Afrikaner population. The Freikorps's goal was to support the Maritz rebellion that arose after the Union government sided with Great Britain at the outbreak of war in August 1914. The rebels strongly opposed the Union Defense Force (UDF) invasion of German South West Africa and saw British forces' diversion to other fields by the broader war as an opportunity to restore the independence of the Boer republics.

The Freikorps operated independently but under the aegis of the German Imperial Forces, the so-called Schutztruppe. The German governor, Theodor Seitz, fully supported the Freikorps' efforts from a strategic point of view, believing the Boers could defeat Botha's government and provide a ready German ally in South Africa. Armed with ammunition, uniforms, materiel, and military support from the German government in Windhoek, the Freikorps joined the rebels in the Northwest Cape in their siege of Upington. De Wet journeyed with the Boer troops from Windhoek to Nakop, serving as captain and commander of the Freikorps regiment sent to join Gen. Maritz there, but soon resigned and was replaced by Cmdt. Stoffel Schoeman.

Quickly and poorly trained for numerous battles against the much better equipped UDF, the Freikorps ultimately failed to gain the upper hand in Cape Colony. The members lacked discipline, the rebel leaders often fought among themselves, and contact with the German commanders on the other side of the border was almost completely lost. The last rebel units surrendered to the UDF on 2 and 3 February 1915, and Seitz officially ordered the unit disbanded on 15 February, effective from 1 March. After the rebellion was suppressed and the slight Freikorps incursion into the Northwest Cape ended, Botha's army had little trouble defeating the Schutztruppe and capturing Windhoek on May 9 without opposition. Only two months later, the German surrender was signed to the north, in Khorab.

== In South West Africa ==
De Wet returned to his farm and soon began participating in local politics. He helped found the United National South West Party and advocated in 1928 for the repatriation of the Dorslandtrekkers from Portuguese soil to South West Africa.

== Personal life ==
His marriage in 1903 in German South West Africa to Elisabeth von Hagedorn (to whom he had been engaged in Germany a year before his return to Africa) produced four children. Leni, Ani, Hetwig and Andries. After her death, he married Elisabeth Catherina Ackerman, whom he later divorced but with whom he had a son. He was survived by his third wife, Anna Jacoba van Heerden, and was buried in Windhoek. A street southeast of downtown Windhoek was named for him.

== Sources ==
- (af) Nienaber, P. J. 1947. Afrikaanse biografiese woordeboek Deel 1. ("Afrikaner Biographical Dictionary Part 1") Johannesburg: L. en S. Boek- en Kunssentrum.
- (af) Krüger, D. W. (up to 1972) and Beyers, C.J. (since 1973). 1977. Suid-Afrikaanse Biografiese Woordeboek. ("South African Biographical Dictionary") Cape Town: Tafelberg-Uitgewers.
- (en) Trümpelmann, G.P.J. and Potgieter, D.J. 1971. Standard Encyclopaedia of Southern Africa. Cape Town: Nasionale Opvoedkundige Uitgewery Ltd.
- (en) Fighting with the Germans against their own people. URL accessed 3 October 2015.
