= Battle of Silkaatsnek =

Battle of the Second Boer War

(First) Battle of Silkaatsnek
- Part of Second Boer War
Date	11 July 1900
Location	Silkaatsnek, Transvaal
Result	An early Boer victory using guerrilla tactics

Belligerents
South African Republic	United Kingdom

Commanders and leaders
Koos de la Rey	Lt.Col. H.R. Roberts; Lt.Col. W.P. Alexander; Maj. Harry Scobell

Strength
	2nd Dragoons (Royal Scots Greys); 2nd Battalion, Royal Lincolnshire Regiment (5 companies); 2 cannons, RHA

Casualties and losses
11 killed	24 killed 44 wounded 198 prisoners

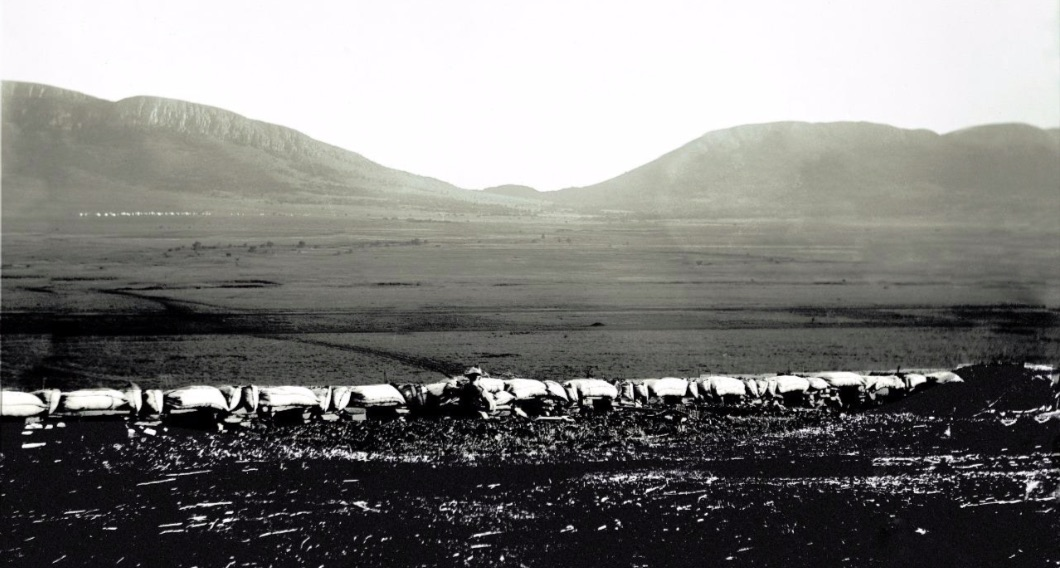
Silkaatsnek, a pass in the Magaliesberg mountain range viewed from the British army camp at Rietfontein in the centre distance, Gauteng, South Africa, 1901.

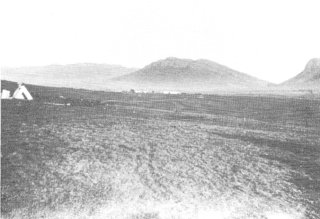
Silkaatsnek and the Crocodile River Crossing from the western end of Rietfontein camp, around 1900.

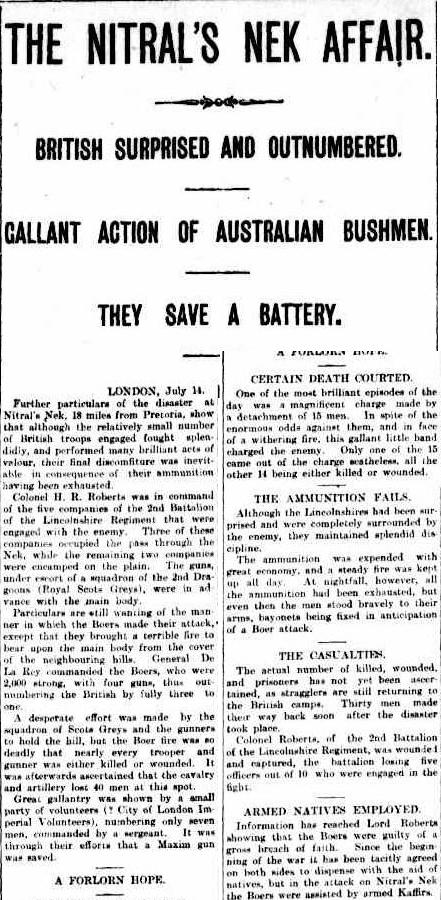
Australian newspaper article The Nitral's Nek Affair, The Argus (Melbourne), page 5, 16 July 1900. Nitral's Nek is a synonym for Silkaatsnek.

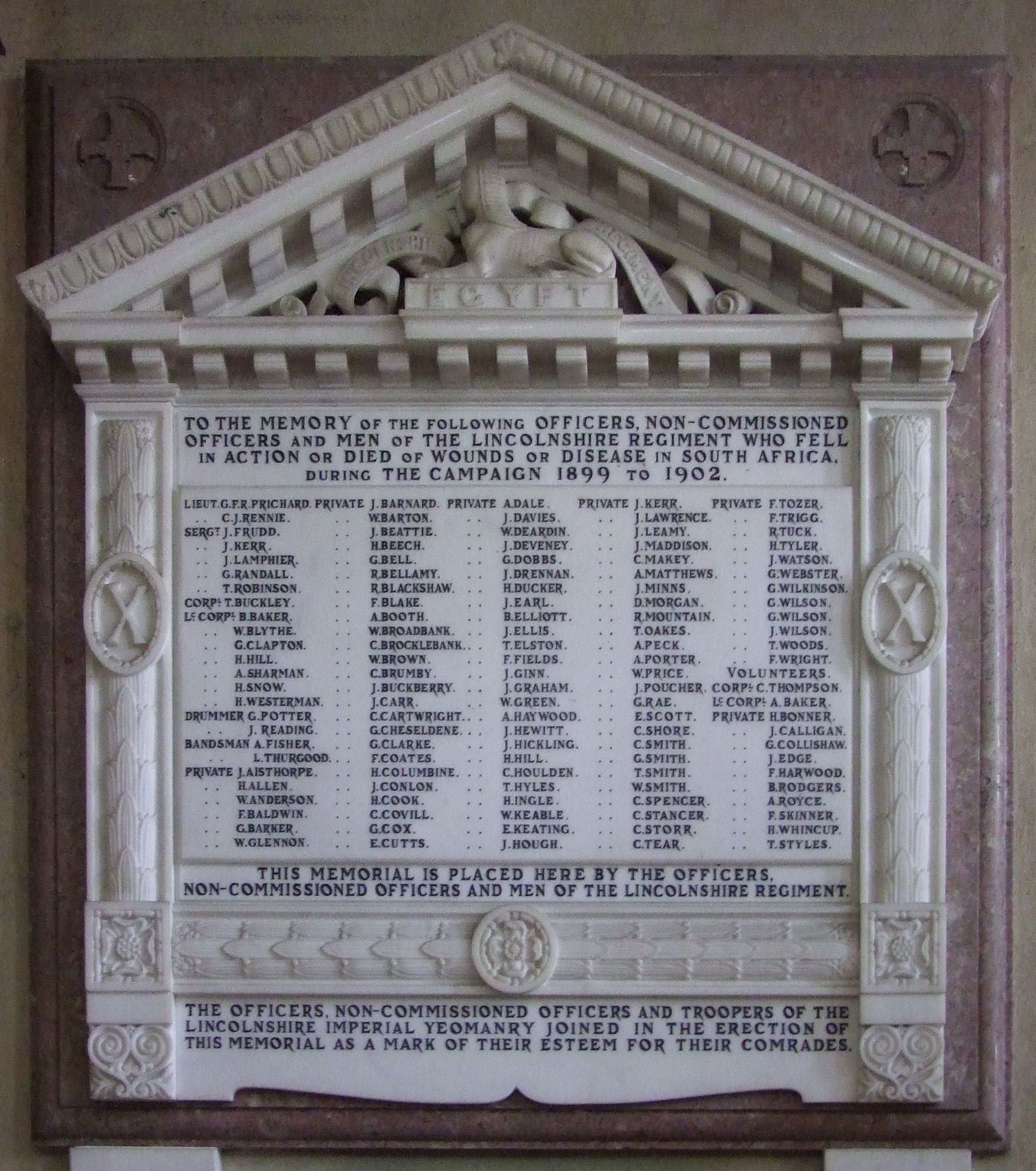
Royal Lincolnshire Regiment Boer War Memorial, listing various British casualties of the Battle of Silkaatsnek.

The Battle of Silkaatsnek (Afrikaans: Slag van Silkaatsnek, English: Battle of Zilikat's (Silikat's, Uitval's or Nitral's) Nek, or First Battle of Silkaatsnek) was a military engagement in the Anglo-Boer War on July 11, 1900, at the Silkaatsnek mountain pass, between Pretoria and Rustenburg. Boer guerrillas under assistant-commander general Koos de la Rey surprised British troops, using a new guerrilla tactic instead of fighting a set-piece battle. On the same day of July 11, 1900, the British also suffered two similar reversals, at Battle of Dwarsvlei in Krugersdorp district and at Onderstepoort, but a few days later, on 16 July 1900, they withstood a Boer attack in the Battle of Witpoort east of Pretoria.

== Prelude ==
Transvaal capital Pretoria fell to the British troops on 5 June 1900, and the Battle of Diamond Hill, fought 16 km east of Pretoria on 11 and 12 June 1900 was also lost by the Boer troops. Remaining Boer forces vanished north of the Magaliesberg mountain range, extending north of Pretoria to the west. With its sheer southern cliff face, traffic can only cross this range at seven passes or Neks, such as Kommandonek, Olifantsnek and Silkaatsnek, the latter located at 27 km west of Pretoria.

== (First) Battle of Silkaatsnek, 11 July 1900 ==
De la Rey's 200 Boer troops surprised the Royal Scots Greys and Lincolns in the U-shaped mountain pass, attacking from the north where no guards were positioned by Col. H.R. Roberts. Col. W.P. Alexander who camped with his troops at some distance did not come to the rescue, so that the Boers killed 24, wounded 44, and took 198 prisoner, including the squadron of Scots Greys together with their commanding officer Roberts, adjutant and 84 men of the Lincolnshire regiment. The remainder of the British retreated to Pretoria.

=== Aftermath ===
British field Marshal Frederick Roberts, 1st Earl Roberts censured the commanding officers (COs) of the Scots Greys (Col. Alexander) and Lincolns (Col. Roberts), the latter of whom had surrendered to De la Rey at Silkaatsnek and was not present at the Board of Enquiry held on 14 July in Pretoria. Col. Roberts was reprimanded for 'failure to adopt ordinary precautions' and Col. Alexander for 'want of military appreciation of the position' and failing to give assistance.

== Second Battle of Silkaatsnek, 2 August 1900 ==
The lesser-known Second Battle of Silkaatsnek was an engagement at the same location fought on August 2, 1900, when Lt Gen Ian S.M. Hamilton and his troops attacked the Pretoria West Commando holding the pass under Kommandant Coetzee, in command since De la Rey left. The British infantry forces of 7.600 men led by general Hamilton attacked from the south and the cavalry of 1700 mounted men, led by brigadier general B. T. Mahon, from the north in a pincer movement, so that the diminished garrison of 300 to 400 Boer burghers had to retreat leaving their wagons behind. Kommandant Coetzee was among the killed Boers, but remaining troops escaped to the north.

== See also ==
- List of battles in the Second Boer War

== Literature ==
- Breytenbach, J. H. (1996). Die beleg van Mafeking tot met die Slag van Bergendal [The siege of Mafeking up to the Battle of Bergendal]. Die Geskiedenis van die Tweede Vryheidsoorlog in Suid-Afrika, 1899–1902 (in Afrikaans). Vol. VI. Pretoria: Die Staatsdrukker. pp. 256–261. ISBN 9780797033214. OCLC 813492747.
- Copley, I.B. (June 1993). "The Battle of Silkaatsnek - 11 July 1900". Military History Journal. 9 (3). The South African Military History Society. Die Suid-Afrikaanse Krygshistoriese Vereniging.
- Copley, Ian B. (December 1995). "The Second Battle of Silkaatsnek 2 August 1900". Military History Journal. 10 (2). The South African Military History Society. Die Suid-Afrikaanse Krygshistoriese Vereniging.
- Pakenham, Thomas (1979). The Boer War. London: Weidenfeld & Nicolson. pp. 448, 472. ISBN 029777395X. OCLC 905293995.
