= Jan Celliers =

Boer general (1861–1931)

Johannes Gerhardus Celliers

Personal details
- Born: 21 July 1861 Fraserburg, Karoo, Cape Colony
- Died: 9 January 1931 (aged 69) Potchefstroom, North West Province
- Profession: Police officer, Boer general

Military service
- Allegiance: South African Republic
- Years of service: 1880–1881, 1899–1902
- Commands: Lichtenburg and Marico
- Battles/wars: First Boer War, Second Boer War: Veggeneraal (fighting general)

Johannes Gerhardus Celliers (Jan Celliers, also Cilliers, 21 July 1861 – 9 January 1931) was a Boer general in the Anglo-Boer War (1899-1902) in South Africa.

== Youth ==
Jan Celliers was born in Fraserburg in the Karoo, Northern Cape, as a son of Jacob Daniel Celliers (circa 1835 - 1871) and Johanna Elizabeth Blom (Kruger, Fraserburg, circa februari 1837 - Lichtenburg, 11 July 1921). At a young age Celliers migrated to the Transvaal (South African Republic) where he fought in the First Boer War (1880-1881) in the Marico Kommando.

== Second Boer War ==
At the outbreak of the Second Boer War (Anglo-Boer War) in October 1899 he was a police officer at Krugersdorp. In this war Celliers served as a general for the districts of Lichtenburg and Marico. He became renowned for his methods of firing a gun while galloping fast on a horse, as well as silencing British cannons. In early 1902 he surprised with less than 500 soldiers British Colonel Stanley von Donop and his 1,000 troops who fled. In a meeting with Boer commanders on 29 May 1902 at Vereeniging, Celliers' vote was with those who proposed to stop fighting. Subsequently, he was one of the signatories of the Treaty of Vereeniging in Pretoria concluding the war on 31 May 1902.

== Literature ==
- Breytenbach, J. H. (1977). Die Boereterugtog uit Kaapland [The Boer retreat from the Cape Colony]. Die Geskiedenis van die Tweede Vryheidsoorlog in Suid-Afrika, 1899-1902 (in Afrikaans). Vol. IV. Pretoria: Die Staatsdrukker. P. 148-149.
- Breytenbach, J. H. (1983). Die Britse Opmars tot in Pretoria [The British advance to Pretoria]. Die Geskiedenis van die Tweede Vryheidsoorlog in Suid-Afrika, 1899-1902 (in Afrikaans). Vol. V. Pretoria: Die Staatsdrukker. ISBN 9780621083606. OCLC 769254652. Pages 89 and 118.
- Grobler, J. E. H. The War Reporter: the Anglo-Boer war through the eyes of the burghers, Johannesburg: Jonathan Ball Publishers, 2004. ISBN 978-1-86842-186-2. P. 111, 131, 134, 137, 139, 141, 146, and 149.
- Strydom C (1977). "Celliers, Johannes (Jan) Gerhardus". In De Kock WJ, Krüger DW, Beyers CJ, Basson JL (eds.). Dictionary of South African Biography Vol III (1st ed.). Cape Town: Tafelberg-Uitgewers. pp. 137–138. ISBN 0624008495. OCLC 1063845175.
