= Sarel Oosthuizen =

Boer War Boer general (1862–1900)

Sarel François Oosthuizen
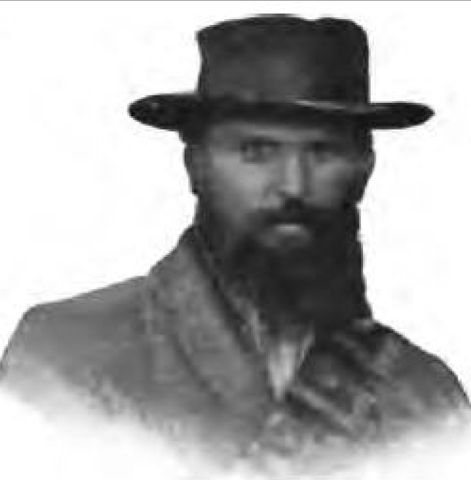
- Boer War General Sarel Francois Oosthuizen (1862 – 1900)

Personal details
- Born: 22 March 1862 Sterkfontein, in later Krugersdorp district, South African Republic
- Died: 14 August 1900 (aged 38) Zanddrift, Crocodile River (Limpopo)
- Spouse: Susanna Cornelia Hendrika Johanna Alberts
- Parent(s): Daniel Jacobus Oosthuizen and Anna Susanna du Toit
- Occupation: farmer, Boer war field cornet, fighting general

Military service
- Allegiance: South African Republic
- Battles/wars: First Boer War; Jameson Raid; Second Boer War; Battle of Talana Hill; Battle of Chieveley; Battle of Willow Grange; Battle of Colenso; Battle of Spion Kop; Battle of Doornkop; Battle of Diamond Hill; Battle of Dwarsvlei

Sarel François Oosthuizen (Afrikaans: Rooibul van Krugersdorp, translation: Red bull of Krugersdorp), 22 March 1862 – 14 August 1900) was a Boer War general. In 1920 he was posthumously awarded the Dekoratie Voor Trouwe Dienst, Anglo-Boeroorlog, 1899-1902 (D.T.D., translation: Decoration for Loyal Service).

== Family ==
Sarel Oosthuizen was the eldest child of Voortrekker Daniel Jacobus Oosthuizen (Prince Albert, South Africa (Albertsburg), 26 July 1821 - Sterkfontein, Krugersdorp, 6 June 1899) and his second wife Anna Susanna du Toit (14 November 1840 - Krugersdorp, 20 September 1921), among in total five sons and three daughters of this couple. Sarel Oosthuizen married Susanna Cornelia Hendrika Johanna Alberts (11 September 1866 - Krugersdorp, 22 June 1950), daughter of Commandant Johannes Joachim Alberts, and had six daughters and three sons by her.

== Early career ==
At a young age he started farming and was called Rooibul van Krugersdorp because of his red hair. He participated in the siege of Pretoria during the First Boer War (1880-1881), in various military operations against indigenous peoples and in the Boer capture of the British invaders of the Jameson Raid (29 December 1895 – 2 January 1896) at Doornkop.

== Second Boer War ==
In 1899 Oosthuizen was elected field cornet (Afrikaans: veldkornet) for his town of Krugersdorp and left with this Commando for the Natal front against the British. He was lightly wounded in the first battle, the Battle of Talana Hill (Battle of Glencoe, Afrikaans: Slag van Talana) on 20 October 1899. Later he joined in the Boer derailing of a British armoured reconnaissance train at Chieveley on 15 November 1899 and apprehended its passenger The Morning Post reporter Winston Churchill, who later erroneously thought that he was arrested by Louis Botha. At the Battle of Colenso on 15 December 1899 Oosthuizen captured ten British cannon. He distinguished himself in the Battle of Spion Kop (Slag van Spioenkop, 23–24 January 1900) and was made a fighting general (Afrikaans: veggeneraal) on 24 February 1900.

After the breakthrough of the British troops in the Biggarsberg hills (10-15 May 1900) Oosthuizen was sent to the south-west of the Transvaal. In the lost Battle of Doornkop near Johannesburg (29 May 1900) Oosthuizen supported general Koos de la Rey in the failed Boer campaign to stop the British advance to Johannesburg and Pretoria in the Klipriviersberg area. In the aftermath of the fall of Pretoria on 5 June 1900, Oosthuizen and his Krugersdorp men fought in the lost Battle of Diamond Hill (Slag van Donkerhoek, 11–12 June 1900), after which he retreated to his home district of Krugersdorp. President Paul Kruger, who had fled from Pretoria to Machadodorp, encouraged Oosthuizen and others on 20 June by telegram to keep on fighting. However, Oosthuizen died on 14 August 1900 of the wound in his thigh incurred at the Battle of Dwarsvlei near his farm on 11 July 1900, where he had tried in vain to capture the guns of Smith-Dorrien's men.

== Decoration ==
In 1920 Oosthuizen was posthumously awarded the Dekoratie Voor Trouwe Dienst, Anglo-Boeroorlog, 1899-1902 (D.T.D., translation: Decoration for Loyal Service), the so-called "Anglo-Boere Oorlog Medalje" (Anglo-Boer War Medal) by the Union of South Africa Government, together with 590 other Boer military officers from the Second Boer War.

== Literature ==
- Bossenbroek, M. P. (2018). The Boer War. Translated by Rosenberg, Yvette. New York, NY: Seven Stories Press. pp. 161, 274. ISBN 9781609807474.
- Breytenbach, J. H. (1969–1996). Die Geskiedenis van die Tweede Vryheidsoorlog in Suid-Afrika, 1899–1902 [The History of the Second War of Independence in South Africa, 1899–1902] (in Afrikaans). Pretoria: Die Staatsdrukker.
  - Breytenbach, J. H. (1969). Die Boere-offensief, Okt. – Nov. 1899 [The Boer Offensive, Oct. – Nov. 1899]. Die Geskiedenis van die Tweede Vryheidsoorlog in Suid-Afrika, 1899–1902 (in Afrikaans). Vol. I. Pretoria: Die Staatsdrukker. pp. 371, 379, 478. OCLC 798106662.
  - Breytenbach, J. H. (1971). Die eerste Britse offensief, Nov. – Des. 1899 [The first British offensive, Nov. – Dec. 1899]. Die Geskiedenis van die Tweede Vryheidsoorlog in Suid-Afrika, 1899–1902 (in Afrikaans). Vol. II. Pretoria: Die Staatsdrukker. pp. 242, 250, 283, 313, 486–487. OCLC 768446219.
  - Breytenbach, J. H. (1973). Die stryd in Natal, Jan. – Feb. 1900 [The battle in Natal, Jan. – Feb. 1900]. Die Geskiedenis van die Tweede Vryheidsoorlog in Suid-Afrika, 1899–1902 (in Afrikaans). Vol. III. Pretoria: Die Staatsdrukker. pp. 18, 123, 340, 504, 522, 541, 551. ISBN 9780797012394. OCLC 612581136.
  - Breytenbach, J. H. (1983). Die Britse Opmars tot in Pretoria [The British advance to Pretoria]. Die Geskiedenis van die Tweede Vryheidsoorlog in Suid-Afrika, 1899–1902 (in Afrikaans). Vol. V. Pretoria: Die Staatsdrukker. pp. 491, 493, 520–522, 524, 528, 535. ISBN 9780621083606. OCLC 769254652.
  - Breytenbach, J. H. (1996). Die beleg van Mafeking tot met die Slag van Bergendal [The siege of Mafeking up to the Battle of Bergendal]. Die Geskiedenis van die Tweede Vryheidsoorlog in Suid-Afrika, 1899–1902 (in Afrikaans). Vol. VI. Pretoria: Die Staatsdrukker. pp. 72, 165, 175, 199, 241, 253, 260–263, 266, 290. ISBN 9780797033214. OCLC 813492747.
- Brits JP (1977). "Oosthuizen, Sarel". In Krüger DW, Beyers CJ (eds.). Dictionary of South African Biography Vol III (1st ed.). Cape Town: Tafelberg-Uitgewers. pp. 664–665. ISBN 0624008495. OCLC 1063845175.
- Grobler, J. E. H. (2004). The War Reporter: the Anglo-Boer war through the eyes of the burghers. Johannesburg: Jonathan Ball Publishers. pp. 13, 15, 23, 46, 58, 72, 79, 82, 85–86. ISBN 978-1-86842-186-2. Sarel Oosthuizen should not be confused with Philip Oosthuizen, who is also referred to as "Oosthuizen" by Grobler.
- Heath, Isak S. (1999). Die Rooi Bul van Krugersdorp : veggeneraal S.F. Oosthuizen : sy aandeel in die verloop van die Anglo-Boere-Oorlog 1899-1900 [The Red Bull of Krugersdorp: General S.F. Oosthuizen: his role in the course of the Anglo-Boer War 1899-1900] (in Afrikaans). I. Heath, Centurion (1008 Wilhelm Rd., Eldoraigne, Centurion 0157). ISBN 9780620248204. OCLC 46312882. Biography. 46 pages.
- Smith-Dorrien, Horace Lockwood (1925). "Chapter XV. Lines of communication, Onrust and Olifants Nek". Memories of forty-eight years' service. London: J. Murray. pp. 215–226. OCLC 906132684. 522 pages. Oosthuizen is referred to as "Oosterheyzen" with his "strong Commando" on page 218, and as "wounded in the thigh" on page 224.
