= List of Afrikaners =

This list includes notable Afrikaner figures who are notable in their areas of expertise.

== South Africa ==
=== Politicians ===
- Jacobus Nicolaas Boshoff: State President of the Orange Free State
- Louis Botha: former Prime Minister of South Africa
- P. W. Botha: Executive State President of South Africa
- Sir Johannes Brand: State President of the Orange Free State
- Thomas François Burgers: State President of the South African Republic
- J. B. M. Hertzog: Prime Minister of South Africa
- F. W. de Klerk: Executive State President of South Africa
- Josias Philip Hoffman: State President of the Orange Free State
- Willem Cornelis Janse van Rensburg: State President of the South African Republic
- Paul Kruger: State President of the South African Republic
- D. F. Malan: Prime Minister of South Africa
- Lucas Johannes Meyer: State President of the Nieuwe Republiek
- Andries Pretorius: President of the Natalia Republic
- Marthinus Wessel Pretorius: State President of the South African Republic
- Marthinus Prinsloo: Commander-in-Chief of the Orange Free State
- Marthinus Prinsloo: President of the Republic of Graaff-Reinet
- Francis William Reitz: State President of the Orange Free State
- Jan Smuts: Prime Minister of South Africa
- Hermanus Steyn: President of the Republic of Swellendam
- Martinus Theunis Steyn: State President of the Orange Free State
- J. G. Strijdom: Prime Minister of South Africa
- John Vorster: Prime Minister of South Africa

=== Military ===
- Christiaan Frederik Beyers: Second Boer War General
- Chris Botha: Second Boer War General
- Ben Bouwer: Second Boer War & World War I General
- Philip Botha: Second Boer War General
- Schalk Willem Burger: Second Boer War General
- Jan Celliers: Second Boer War General
- Andries Petrus Cronjé: Second Boer War General
- Andries Petrus Johannes Cronjé: Second Boer War General
- Piet Cronjé: Second Boer War General
- Jonathan Crowther: Second Boer War General
- Koos de la Rey: Second Boer War General
- Christiaan de Wet: Second Boer War General
- Piet de Wet: Second Boer War General
- Sarel du Toit: Second Boer War General
- Daniel Jacobus Elardus Erasmus: Second Boer War General
- Joachim Ferreira: First Boer War Commandant
- Naas Ferreira: Second Boer War General
- Christiaan Ernst Fourie: Second Boer War General
- Joachim Christoffel Fourie: Second Boer War General
- Piet Fourie: Second Boer War General
- Francois Gerhardus Joubert: First Boer War General
- Piet Joubert: First Boer War General
- Jan Kemp: Boer General
- Johannes Hermanus Michiel Kock: Second Boer War General
- Pieter Hendrik Kritzinger: Second Boer War General
- Petrus Johannes Liebenberg: Second Boer War General
- Manie Maritz: Second Boer War General
- Chris Muller: Second Boer War General
- Jan Hendrik Olivier: Boer General
- Marthinus Jacobus Oosthuizen: Voortrekker leader
- Sarel Oosthuizen: Second Boer War General
- Ferdinandus Jacobus Potgieter: Second Boer War General
- Hendrik Potgieter: Voortrekker leader
- Paul Hendrik Roux: Boer General
- Nicolaas Smit: First Boer War General
- Tobias Smuts: Second Boer War General
- Jacobus Philippus Snyman: Second Boer War General
- Ben Viljoen: Second Boer War General, participant in the Mexican Revolution
- George de Villebois-Mareuil: Second Boer War General
- Wessel Jacobus Wessels: Boer General
- Constand Viljoen: SADF Border war General

=== Arts ===
- Melinda Bam: Miss South Africa 2011
- François Bloemhof, author
- Lesley-Ann Brandt, actress
- J. M. Coetzee, 2003 Nobel Prize in Literature
- Charlbi Dean, actress
- Hennie Jacobs, actor
- Karl Kielblock, author
- Sasha Pieterse, actress
- Rolene Strauss, Miss World 2014
- Charlize Theron, actress
- Arnold Vosloo, actor
- Candice Swanepoel, model

=== Sports ===
- Francois Botha: Boxer
- Gary Botha: Rugby Player
- Francois Brummer: Rugby Player
- Schalk Burger: Rugby Player
- Gerrie Coetzee: Boxer
- Lood de Jager: Rugby Player
- Faf de Klerk: Rugby Player
- AB de Villiers: former Captain of South Africa national cricket team
- Giniel de Villiers: 2009 Dakar Rally Champion
- Dricus du Plessis: UFC Middleweight Mixed Martial Artist
- Faf du Plessis: former Captain of the South Africa national cricket team
- Johan du Toit: Rugby Player
- Pieter-Steph du Toit: Rugby Player
- André Esterhuizen: Rugby Player
- Eben Etzebeth: Rugby Player
- Retief Goosen: U.S. Open (golf) Champion (2001, 2004)
- Faffa Knoetze: Rugby Player
- Francois Pienaar: Rugby Player
- Handré Pollard: Springboks Captain
- Corrie Sanders: WBO World Heavyweight Champion
- Gurthrö Steenkamp: Rugby Player
- Roelof van der Merwe: Cricketer
- Lara van Niekerk: Swimmer
- Duane Vermeulen: Springboks Captain
- Hansie Cronje: Cricketer

=== Business ===
- Koos Bekker: Businessman
- Johann Rupert: Businessman

== Namibia ==
=== Politicians ===
- Jan de Wet: Member of Parliament
- Leon Jooste: Minister of Public Enterprise
- Kosie Pretorius: Member of Parliament
- Piet van der Walt: Deputy Minister of National Planning

=== Science and Technology ===
- Rudie van Vuuren: Physician

=== Arts ===
- Behati Prinsloo: Model
- Chanique Rabe: Miss Supranational 2021

=== Sports ===
- Renaldo Bothma: Rugby Player
- Eneill Buitendag: Rugby Player
- Aranos Coetzee: Rugby Player
- Tinus du Plessis: Rugby Player
- Theuns Kotzé: Rugby Player
- Raoul Larson: Rugby Player
- Conrad Marais: Rugby Player
- Johann Tromp: Rugby Player
- Louis van der Westhuizen: Rugby Player
- Torsten van Jaarsveld: Rugby Player
- P. J. van Lill: Rugby Player

== Zimbabwe ==
=== Politicians ===
- Rowan Cronjé: Minister of Education
- P. K. van der Byl: Minister of Foreign Affairs

=== Arts ===
- Peter Niesewand: Journalist

=== Sports ===
- Dylan de Beer: Cricketer
- Brian van Niekerk: Boxer
- Dirk Viljoen: Cricketer

== Botswana ==
=== Politicians ===
- Christian de Graaff: Minister of Agriculture

== Netherlands ==
- Philippe Sandler

== United States ==
- Embeth Davidtz: Actress
- Dion von Moltke: Race Car Driver
