= Wessel (name) =

Wessel (English: /ˈwɛsəl/; German: [ˈvɛsl̩]) is a diminutive of the given name Werner of Frisian, German, and Dutch origin. People with this name include:

== Given name ==
- Wessel van Diepen (born 1966), Dutch radio host
- Wessel Freytag von Loringhoven (1899–1944), German military commander and member of the German Resistance
- Wessel Gansfort (1419–1489), Dutch theologian and early humanist
- Wessel te Gussinklo, Dutch poet, winner of the 1996 Ferdinand Bordewijk Prize
- Wessel Myburgh (born 1990), Namibian cricketer
- Marthinus Wessel Pretorius (1819–1901), first president of the South African Republic
- Wessel Roux (born 1975), South African rugby player
- Wessel Jacobus Wessels (1865–1945), Boer general
- Peter Wessel Zapffe (1899 – 1990), Norwegian metaphysician, author, lawyer and mountaineer

== Surname ==
- Andreas Wessel (1858–1940), Norwegian physician and politician
- Bernhard Wessel (1936–2022), German football player
- Beth Wessel-Kroeschell, American politician from Iowa
- Birgit Wessel (1911–2000), Norwegian textile artist
- Caspar Wessel (1745–1818), Dano-Norwegian mathematician, first to describe the complex numbers
- Christer Wessel (born 1943), Swedish curler
- David Wessel (born 1954), American journalist
- Dick Wessel (1913–1965), American film actor
- Ellisif Wessel (1866–1949), Norwegian writer, trade unionist and politician
- Franz Wessel (1903–1958), German judge
- Friedrich Wessel (born 1945), German fencer
- Hedvig Wessel (born 1995), Norwegian freestyle skier
- Helene Wessel (1898–1969), German politician
- Hendricus Wessel (1887–1977), Dutch long-distance runner
- Henry Wessel, Jr. (1942–2018), American photographer
- Horst Wessel (1907–1930), Nazi brownshirt, glorified as a martyr in the Horst-Wessel-Lied
- Jessie Wessel (1894–1948), Swedish actress
- Johan Herman Wessel (1742–1785), Dano-Norwegian writer, brother of Caspar
- Kai Wessel (countertenor) (born 1964), German countertenor
- Kathrin Weßel (born 1967), German long-distance runner
- Mark Wessel (1894–1973), American pianist and composer
- Mark Wessel, American educator
- Mike Wessel (born 1977), American mixed martial arts fighter
- Morris A. Wessel (1917–2016), American pediatrician
- Ole Christopher Wessel (1744–1794), Norwegian jurist and land surveyor
- Pål Wessel, Norwegian geophysicist
- Paul Wessel (1904–1967), East German politician
- Peter Wessel (1690–1720), also known as Tordenskjold, Dano-Norwegian naval war hero
- Ulrich Wessel (1946–1975), German member of the Red Army Faction
- Walter Wessel (1892–1943), German army general
- Wilhelm Wessel, 17th-century German book publisher

== See also ==
- Wessels, a (surname)
