= Andries Petrus Cronjé =

Orange Free State Boer War general

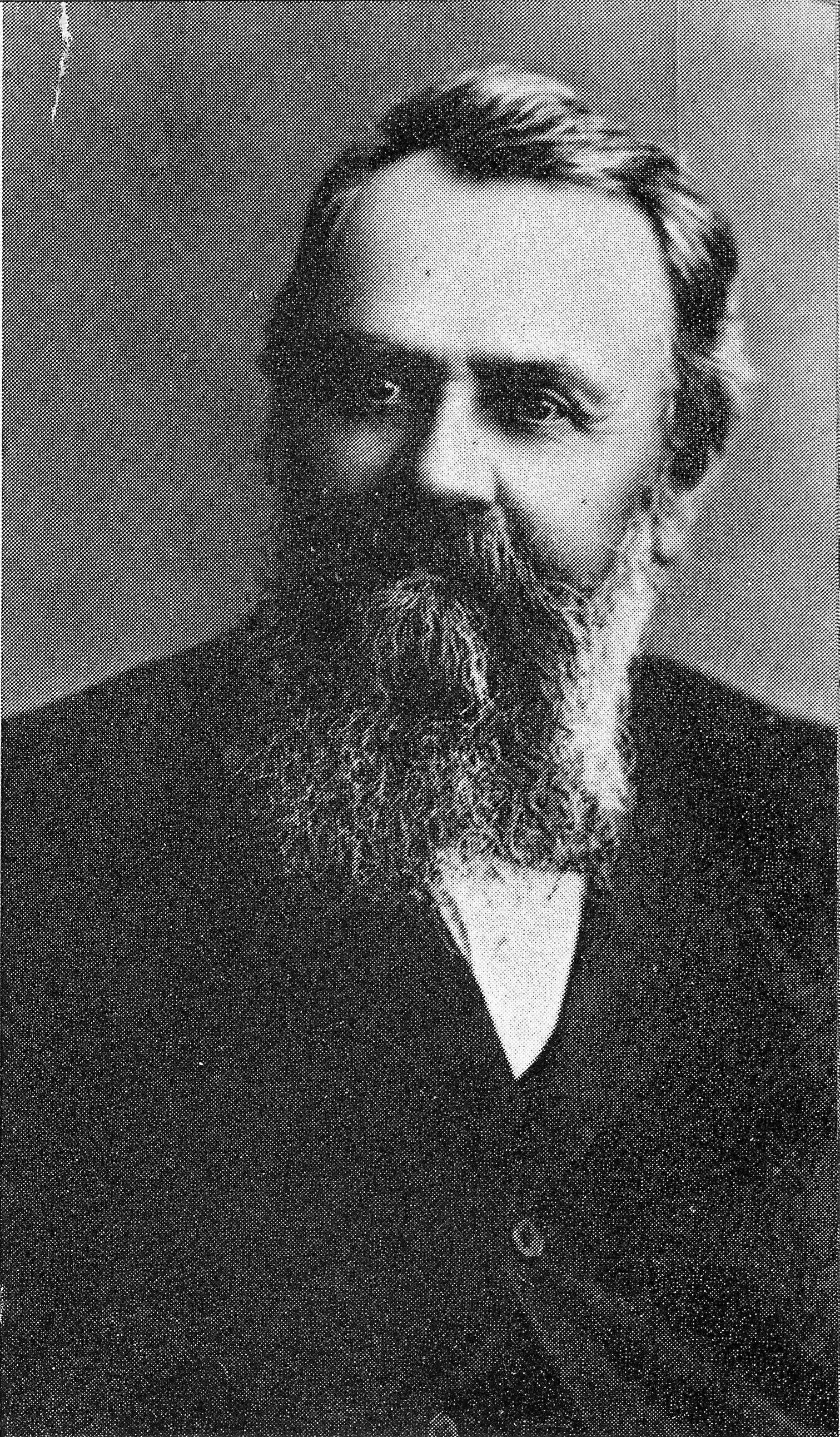
- Boer War General Andries Petrus Cronjé

Personal details
- Born: 1 January 1833 Riversdal District, Cape Colony, South Africa
- Died: 20 September 1916 (aged 83) "Welgelegen", Winburg District, Orange Free State, South Africa
- Spouse: Cornelia Christina Cronjé
- Parent(s): Johannes Daniel Cronjé and Dina Judith Geertruida Woudrina Rall
- Occupation: Heemraad, representative for Zand Rivier in the Eerste Volksraad 1896, field cornet, assistant commandant general, combat general

Military service
- Allegiance: Orange Free State
- Battles/wars: Battle of Boomplaats, 1848; First Boer War, 1880-1881; Basuto wars; Second Boer War, 1899-1902: many battles including the Battle of Colenso (15 December 1900), and the Battle of Spion Kop (Spioenkop, 23–24 January 1900); commands: Ermelo Commando, but also Carolina, Standerton, Swaziland and Wakkerstroom Commandos

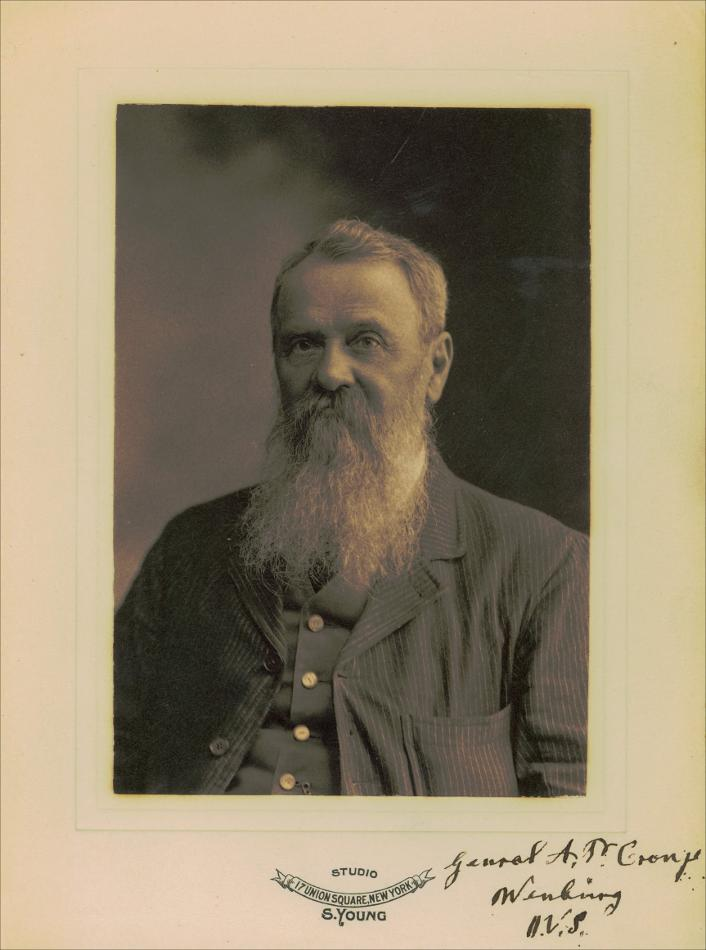
Andries Petrus Cronjé from Winburg in New York, 1903

Andries Petrus Cronjé (January 1, 1833 – September 20, 1916) was a Second Boer War Boer general and a member of the Orange Free State Volksraad and the Orange River Colony parliament. He should not be confused with Boer general Andries Petrus Johannes Cronjé (1849 – 1923), who surrendered and cooperated with the British in the National Scouts.

== Family ==
Andries Petrus Cronjé was born the eldest child among in total five sons and four daughters of Johannes Daniel Cronjé (Swellendam, Overberg, Western Cape, South Africa, 21 October 1806 – Kroonstad, Northern Free State, Free State, 4 April 1901, after a march forced by the British) and Dina Judith Geertruida Woudrina Rall (12 September 1812 – Concentration camp Kroonstad, Orange Free State, 2 April 1901, after a march forced by the British). Andries Petrus married his first cousin Cornelia Christina Cronjé (also her maiden name, Swellendam, Overberg, Western Cape, South Africa, 8 July 1838 – Strijdfontein, Winburg, Orange Free State, 27 March 1928) and had twelve children by her, at least six daughters and five sons.

== Career ==
Born in Cape Colony Cronjé moved with his Voortrekker family into the region beyond the Orange River of the later Orange Free State. As a young boy he participated in the lost Battle of Boomplaats against the British on August 29, 1848. Cronjé was an assistant field cornet (from 1858) and later a field cornet in the Basuto wars. He was appointed a heemraad (high civil servant in the Free State, af). During 1879 – 1883 and 1887 – 1899 Cronjé represented the Zand River district in the Free State Volksraad. In the First Anglo-Boer War (1880 – 1881) he supplied ammunition to the commandos. In 1895 he was promoted to military kommandant (commander).

=== Second Boer War ===
After the outbreak of the Second Anglo-Boer War in October 1899, Cronjé was appointed a combat general (Afrikaans: veggeneraal). He commanded Free State army commandos at the front of Natal Colony and fought in the Battles of Rietfontein (24 October 1899), Modderspruit (Lombard's Kop) and Nicholson's Nek (30 October 1899). He took part in the Siege of Ladysmith in November 1899 and fought in the Battle of Colenso (15 December 1899), Spioenkop (24 January 1900) and of Vaalkrans (Vaal Krantz, 5–7 February 1900). On February 16, 1900, he left Natal for Paardeberg where he attempted in cooperation with Christiaan de Wet to relieve the beleaguered troops of general Piet Cronjé in the Battle of Paardeberg (18–27 February 1900). At Driefontein (10 March 1900) and Sannaspos (31 March 1900) Cronjé fought together with De Wet, and took part in the last War Council of both Boer republics combined in Kroonstad on 20 March 1900, where Louis Botha's new offensive military tactic of hit-and-run was decided.

After the Orange Free State government had to evacuate its capital of Bloemfontein on 13 March 1900, President M. T. Steyn promoted Cronjé to cabinet member of the government in the field. In September 1900 Cronjé supported the President in the meetings of the Free State and Transvaal governments at Waterval Onder, Nelspruit (now Mbombela) and Hectorspruit, west of Komatipoort. He was appointed a member of the Executive Council on January 25, 1901. However on July 11, 1901, the British captured the Orange Free State cabinet, except president Steyn, at Reitz, Free State. The prisoners of war were exiled to Bermuda, a British Overseas Territory in the North Atlantic Ocean, for the remainder of the war.

=== After the Boer War ===
After the peace Treaty of Vereeniging of May 31, 1902, Cronjé went to New York, where he had his portrait taken and returned to South Africa. Starting in 1907 he was a member of the new Legislative Council of the self-governing British Orange River Colony, until his retirement in 1910.

== Literature ==
- Breytenbach, J. H. (1969–1996). Die Geskiedenis van die Tweede Vryheidsoorlog in Suid-Afrika, 1899–1902 [The History of the Second War of Independence in South Africa, 1899–1902] (in Afrikaans). Pretoria: Die Staatsdrukker.
  - Breytenbach, J. H. (1969). Die Boere-offensief, Okt. – Nov. 1899 [The Boer Offensive, Oct. – Nov. 1899]. Die Geskiedenis van die Tweede Vryheidsoorlog in Suid-Afrika, 1899–1902 (in Afrikaans). Vol. I. Pretoria: Die Staatsdrukker. OCLC 798106662. Pages 170, 172, 177, 290, 296, 298, 300-301, 307, 331, 348, 353, 355note, 357, 359, 367, and 466-468.
  - Breytenbach, J. H. (1971). Die eerste Britse offensief, Nov. – Des. 1899 [The first British offensive, Nov. – Dec. 1899]. Die Geskiedenis van die Tweede Vryheidsoorlog in Suid-Afrika, 1899–1902 (in Afrikaans). Vol. II. Pretoria: Die Staatsdrukker. Page 251.
  - Breytenbach, J. H. (1973). Die stryd in Natal, Jan. – Feb. 1900 [The battle in Natal, Jan. – Feb. 1900]. Die Geskiedenis van die Tweede Vryheidsoorlog in Suid-Afrika, 1899–1902 (in Afrikaans). Vol. III. Pretoria: Die Staatsdrukker. ISBN 9780797012394. OCLC 612581136. Pages 2–5, 58, 62-63, 71, 77-79, 83-88, 92, 97, 108-111, 114, 210, 227, 230, 261, 267-268, 271-273, 277, 307-317, 323, 396, and photo 18.
  - Breytenbach, J. H. (1977). Die Boereterugtog uit Kaapland [The Boer retreat from the Cape Colony]. Die Geskiedenis van die Tweede Vryheidsoorlog in Suid-Afrika, 1899–1902 (in Afrikaans). Vol. IV. Pretoria: Die Staatsdrukker. Pages 379 and 392.
  - Breytenbach, J. H. (1983). Die Britse Opmars tot in Pretoria [The British advance to Pretoria]. Die Geskiedenis van die Tweede Vryheidsoorlog in Suid-Afrika, 1899–1902 (in Afrikaans). Vol. V. Pretoria: Die Staatsdrukker. ISBN 9780621083606. OCLC 769254652. Pages 72, 116, 164, 193, 223, 262, and 428-433.
  - Breytenbach, J. H. (1996). Die beleg van Mafeking tot met die Slag van Bergendal [The siege of Mafeking up to the Battle of Bergendal]. Die Geskiedenis van die Tweede Vryheidsoorlog in Suid-Afrika, 1899–1902 (in Afrikaans). Vol. VI. Pretoria: Die Staatsdrukker. ISBN 9780797033214. OCLC 813492747. Page 52.
- Krüger QC (1977). "Cronjé, Andries Petrus". In De Kock WJ, Krüger DW, Beyers CJ, Basson JL (eds.). Dictionary of South African Biography Vol III (1st ed.). Cape Town: Tafelberg-Uitgewers. pp. 182–183. ISBN 0624008495. OCLC 1063845175.
- Visagie, J.C. (2011). Voortrekkerstamouers 1835-1845 (2nd ed.). Pretoria: Protea Boekhuis. p. 115. ISBN 9781869193720. OCLC 769302995. Prior edition: Pretoria : Universiteit van Suid-Afrika, 2000.
