= Cronje =

Cronje, sometimes spelt Cronjé, is a surname mainly common among Afrikaners of Huguenot descent. Notable people with the name include:

- Andrew Cronje (born 1984), South African field hockey player
- Andries Petrus Cronjé (1833–1916), Orange Free State Volksraad, cabinet member and Boer general
- Andries Petrus Johannes Cronjé (1849–1923), Boer general and member of National Scouts
- Darryl Cronje (born 1967), South African swimmer
- Erich Cronjé (born 1997), South African rugby union player
- Ewie Cronje (1939–2020), South African cricketer
- Frans Cronje (born 1967), South African former cricketer
- Gavin Cronje (born 1979), South African racing driver
- Guy Cronjé (born 1989), South African-born Zimbabwean international rugby union footballer
- Hansie Cronje (1969–2002), South African cricketer
- Hermione Cronje, South African prosecutor
- Jacques Cronjé (born 1982), South African rugby player
- Johan Cronje (born 1982), South African Olympic athlete
- Lionel Cronjé (born 1989), South African rugby union footballer
- Nicolene Cronje (born 1983), South African race walker
- Peter Cronjé (1949–2020), South African rugby player
- Piet Cronjé (1836–1911), Boer general
- Rowan Cronjé (1937–2014), Rhodesian/Zimbabwean politician
- Ruan Cronje (born 2001), South African cricketer
