= Potchefstroom Commando =

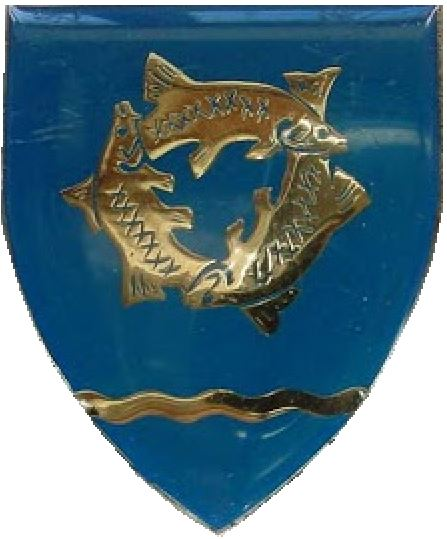
- Potchefstroom Commando emblem
- Country: South Africa
- Allegiance: (South African Republic) Zuid Afrikaanse Republiek; Union of South Africa; Republic of South Africa; Republic of South Africa
- Branch: South African Army; South African Army
- Type: Infantry
- Role: Light Infantry
- Size: One Battalion
- Part of: South African Infantry Corps; Army Territorial Reserve, Group 30
- Garrison/HQ: Potchefstroom

Potchefstroom Commando was a light infantry regiment of the South African Army. It formed part of the South African Army Infantry Formation as well as the South African Territorial Reserve.

== History ==
=== Operations ===
==== With the Zuid Afrikaanse Republiek ====
At the beginning of the Second Boer War, this units commandant was A.P.J. Cronjé, who was later replaced by P.J. Liebenberg.

The commando had an initial strength of 1,249 and fought at :

- Ottoshoop,
- the Siege of Mafeking,
- the Battle of Modder River,
- the Battle of Magersfontein,
- the Battle of Poplar Grove,
- the Battle of Donkerhoek,
- the Battle of Bronkhorstspruit,
- the Battle of Bergendal,
- the Brandwater Basin,
- the 1st de Wet hunt, at Gatsrand and at
- Hartbeesfontein.

==== With the UDF ====
By 1902 all Commando remnants were under British military control and disarmed.

By 1912, however previous Commando members could join shooting associations.

By 1940, such commandos were under control of the National Reserve of Volunteers.

These commandos were formally reactivated by 1948.

==== With the SADF ====
The unit resorted under the command of Group 30.

The Old First Prison was used as this commandos HQ till 1998.

During this era, the unit was mainly used for area force protection, search and cordons as well as stock theft control assistance to the rural police.

==== With the SANDF ====
===== Disbandment =====
This unit, along with all other Commando units was disbanded after a decision by South African President Thabo Mbeki to disband all Commando Units. The Commando system was phased out between 2003 and 2008 "because of the role it played in the apartheid era", according to the Minister of Safety and Security Charles Nqakula.

== Unit Insignia ==
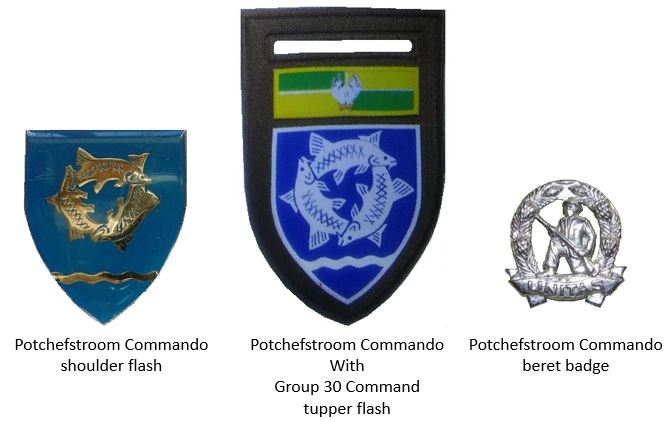
SADF era Potchefstroom Commando insignia

== Leadership ==
Leadership
From	Honorary Colonels	To	Ribbon
XXX	XXX	XXX	
From	Commanding Officers	To	Ribbon
1899	Cmdt Mathinus Johanes Wolmarans	nd	
From	Regimental Sergeants Major	To	Ribbon
XXX	XXX MMM,JCD	XXX	Military Merit Medal MMM John Chard Decoration JCD

== See also ==
- South African Commando System
