= Wessels =

Wessels is a Dutch and Low German patronimic surname, where it was originally a Norman Viking surname. Notable people with the surname include:

- Albert Wessels (1908–1991), South African industrialist
- André Weßels (born 1981), German fencer
- Andreas Wessels (born 1964), German football goalkeeper
- Bredell Wessels (born 1995), Namibian cricketer
- Charlotte Wessels (born 1987), Dutch heavy metal singer
- Cornelius Hermanus Wessels (1851–1924), South African politician and statesman
- Cornelius Wessels (1880–1964), Dutch Jesuit and historian
- David Wessels (born 1982), South African rugby coach
- Dik Wessels (1946–2017), Dutch billionaire, of VolkerWessels
- Dirck Wessels (1638–1717), New Netherland colonist
- Emile Wessels (born 1979), Namibian rugby player
- Glenn Wessels (c. 1932 – 1982), South African-born American artist
- Jaap Wessels (1939–2009), Dutch mathematician
- Jan Gerard Wessels Boer (1936–2019), Dutch plant taxonomist
- Johan Wessels (born 1988), South African rugby player
- John Wessels (judge) (1862–1936), South African jurist
- John Wessels (basketball) (1938–1994), American basketball player
- Kepler Wessels (born 1957), South African cricket player
- Leon Wessels (born 1946), South African lawyer, politician, and activist
- Louis Wessels (born 1998), German tennis player
- Peter Wessels (born 1978), Dutch tennis player
- Riki Wessels (born 1985), Australian cricketer
- Robbie Wessels (born 1980), South African singer and actor
- Roger Wessels (born 1961), South African golfer
- Stefan Wessels (born 1979), German football player
- Stefan Wessels (basketball) (born 1984), Dutch basketball player
- Susan Wessels-Webber (born 1977), South African field hockey player
- Tom Wessels (born 1951), American terrestrial ecologist
- Ulla Wessels (born 1965), German analytic philosopher
- Wessel Jacobus Wessels (1865–1945), Orange Free State Boer War general

As a middle name

- Anna Wessels Williams (1863–1954), American pathologist

== See also ==
- Wessel (disambiguation)
- Wessels, Swedish department store (1911–1977) founded by Th. Wessel
- Wessels Islands
- Wessels mine
