= Andries Petrus Johannes Cronjé =

Second Boer War general

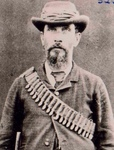
- A. P. J. Cronjé (1849-1923) in an ammunition bandolier.

General

Personal details
- Born: 18 June 1849 Colesberg, Bo-Karoo, Northern Cape, South Africa
- Died: 23 February 1923 (aged 73) Hartbeesfontein, Klerksdorp, Southern DC, North West, South Africa
- Spouse(s): Catharina Michelina Cronje, Johanna Elizabeth Dorothea Cronje (Steyn) and Isabella Johanna Botha
- Parent(s): Andries Petrus Cronjé and Johanna Christina Gildenhuijsen
- Relatives: brother general Piet Cronjé
- Occupation: Boer war commander, later combat general (Afrikaans: Veggeneraal)

Military service
- Allegiance: South African Republic (1899-1900); United Kingdom (1900–1902)
- Battles/wars: Second Boer War; Battle of Paardeberg; Battle of Boshof; Christiana; Battle of Poplar Grove

Andries Petrus Johannes Cronjé (A.P.J. Cronjé, 18 June 1849 – 23 February 1923) was a Second Boer War general, like his older brother Piet Cronjé (1836 – 1911). After surrendering to the British he became a prominent member of the National Scouts Corps, who assisted the British military against the remaining Boer guerrillas in the last years of the Boer War. A.P.J. Cronjé should not be confused with Boer general Andries Petrus Cronjé (A.P. Cronjé, 1833 – 1916), who was captured and sent to Bermuda by the British.

== Family ==
Andries was born the fourth son of Andries Petrus Cronjé (Graaff-Reinet, Eastern Cape, 7 April 1811 – Potchefstroom, North West, 19 September 1882) and Johanna Christina Gildenhuijsen (or Geldenhuys, Sergeants River, Swellendam, Western Cape, 22 December 1814 – Potchefstroom, 13 July 1878), who had seven sons and four daughters. He was a younger brother of general Piet Cronjé (1836 – 1911).

Andries married three times, first with Catharina Michelina Basson (23 June 1849 – Transvaal, 1870), then with Johanna Elizabeth Dorothea Steyn (Potchefstroom, 6 April 1849 – Potchefstroom, 6 March 1904), and finally with Isabella Johanna Botha. Cronjé fathered 11 children, at least six daughters and four sons, including his namesake Andries Petrus Johannes, who died at the Battle of Paardeberg.

== Second Boer War ==
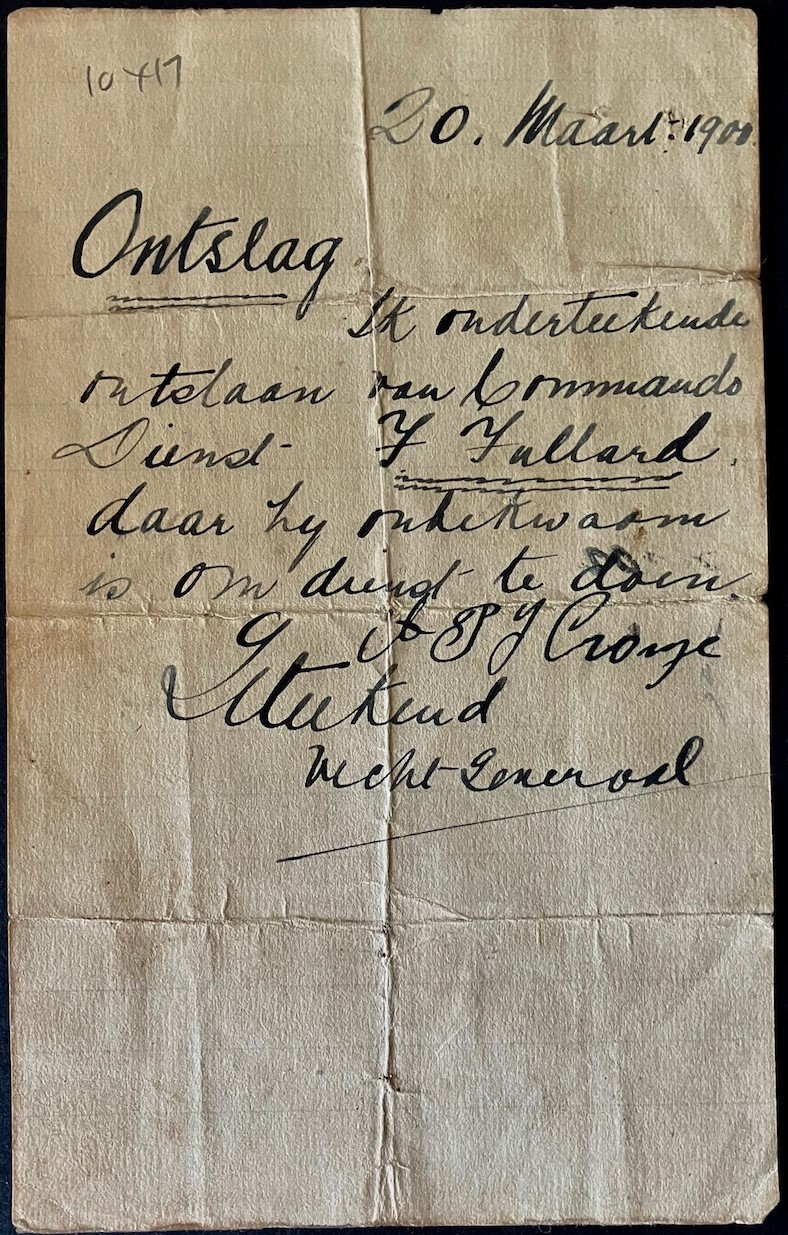
"Ontslag". Notice of dismissal of a soldier from the army issued by general A.P.J. Cronjé, 20 March 1900.

=== Potchefstroom Commander ===
At the outset of the Second Boer War A.P.J. Cronjé was commander of the Potchefstroom Commando and reinforced Christiaan de Wet at Koedoesberg 40 km southwest of Kimberley on 6 February 1900 with 200 men and a Krupp cannon and reached him near Watervalsdrift/Waterval Drift on the Riet River at Wintershoek with 325 men. Then De Wet sent Cronjé to occupy Koffiefontein.

=== Battle of Paardeberg ===
At the Battle of Paardeberg A.P.J. Cronjé and his men fought under the overall command of Orange Free State commander-in-chief general Philip Botha. On 23 February 1900 they tried in vain to extricate A.P.J.'s brother Piet Cronjé from the British encirclement. Andries's son and namesake was killed during a British artillery bombardment of the unfinished bridge at Vandisiedrif over the Modder River, built to rescue Piet Cronjé's troops. After the flight of the failed Boer rescuers before the British, they were scolded at by Orange Free State commander-general De Wet and general Philip Botha. Andries Daniel Wynand Wolmarans (Danie Wolmarans, 1857–1928), member of the Executive (Uitvoerende Raad) of the South African Republic who was present, then decided to place the Transvaal troops under their own combat general and promoted A.P.J. Cronjé to that rank, a nomination that was confirmed by president Paul Kruger. At this point there were, apart from de Wet, six generals: Philip Botha, Christoffel Cornelis Froneman, Andries Petrus Cronjé, C. J. Wessels, Andries Petrus Johannes Cronjé, and W.J. Kolk.

=== Boshof, National Scouts and aftermath ===
A.P.J. succeeded together with commander Diedericks to force Methuen's troops near Boshof to retreat, but without destroying the railways they then retreated themselves to a defensive position on the Vaal River. General Sarel du Toit requested A.P.J. to help beating back the British attack at Veertien Strome (Battle of Veertienstrome/Fourteen Streams, 3–5 May 1900, near Warrenton) but the British had won there before A.P.J. could answer. Later A.P.J. surrendered to the British army on 14 June 1900 and became - with generals like Piet de Wet, the brother of General Christiaan de Wet - a leading figure in the British National Scouts Corps, helping them against the Boer guerrilla army for the remainder of the war.

In 1903 after the war's conclusion, Cronjé with the same Piet de Wet led a deputation to visit Colonial Secretary Joseph Chamberlain in London.

== Literature ==
- Bossenbroek, M.P. and Yvette Rosenberg (Translator), The Boer War, Seven Stories Press, New York, NY, 2018. ISBN 9781609807474, 1609807472. General reference and pages 273, 325, and 383.
- Breytenbach, J. H. (1969–1996). Die Geskiedenis van die Tweede Vryheidsoorlog in Suid-Afrika, 1899–1902 [The History of the Second War of Independence in South Africa, 1899–1902]. Pretoria: Die Staatsdrukker. Six volumes in Afrikaans. General reference.
  - Breytenbach, J. H. (1971). Die eerste Britse offensief, Nov. – Des. 1899 [The first British offensive, Nov. – Dec. 1899]. Die Geskiedenis van die Tweede Vryheidsoorlog in Suid-Afrika, 1899–1902 (in Afrikaans). Vol. II. Pretoria: Die Staatsdrukker. Pages 60 and 154.
  - Breytenbach, J. H. (1977). Die Boereterugtog uit Kaapland [The Boer retreat from the Cape Colony]. Die Geskiedenis van die Tweede Vryheidsoorlog in Suid-Afrika, 1899–1902 (in Afrikaans). Vol. IV. Pretoria: Die Staatsdrukker. Pages 135, 173, 176, 178–179, 188, 198, 346, 367, 379, 407, 465, 481, 483, 485, and 489.
  - Breytenbach, J. H. (1983). Die Britse Opmars tot in Pretoria [The British advance to Pretoria]. Die Geskiedenis van die Tweede Vryheidsoorlog in Suid-Afrika, 1899–1902 (in Afrikaans). Vol. V. Pretoria: Die Staatsdrukker. ISBN 9780621083606. OCLC 769254652. Pages 15, 31, 72, 329, 353–354, 374, 385, 388, 390, 393–394, 411–412, 490–491, 494–495, 497, 520, 524, and 527. Expedition to Boshof, Orange Free State: pp. 379–385.
- Brits JP (1977). "Cronjé, Andries Petrus Johannes". In De Kock WJ, Krüger DW, Beyers CJ, Basson JL (eds.). Dictionary of South African Biography Vol III (1st ed.). Cape Town: Tafelberg-Uitgewers. pp. 183–184. ISBN 0624008495. OCLC 1063845175.
- De Wet, C.R., Three years' war, New York: Charles Scribner's Sons, 1902.
- Pakenham, Thomas, The Boer War, George Weidenfeld & Nicolson, London, 1979. Abacus, 1992. ISBN 0 349 10466 2. General reference and page 542.
