= Wessel =

Wessel may refer to:

- Wessel (name), including a list of people with the name
- Wessel Islands, a group of islands forming part of the Northern Territory, Australia, named after the Dutch ship Wesel in 1636
  - Cape Wessel, the most northerly point of Rimbija Island (itself the northernmost of the Wessel Islands)
- Wessels plass, a square in Oslo, Norway
