= Battle of Driefontein =

1900 battle of Second Boer War

Coordinates: 28°59′37″S 25°39′50″E

- Part of Second Boer War
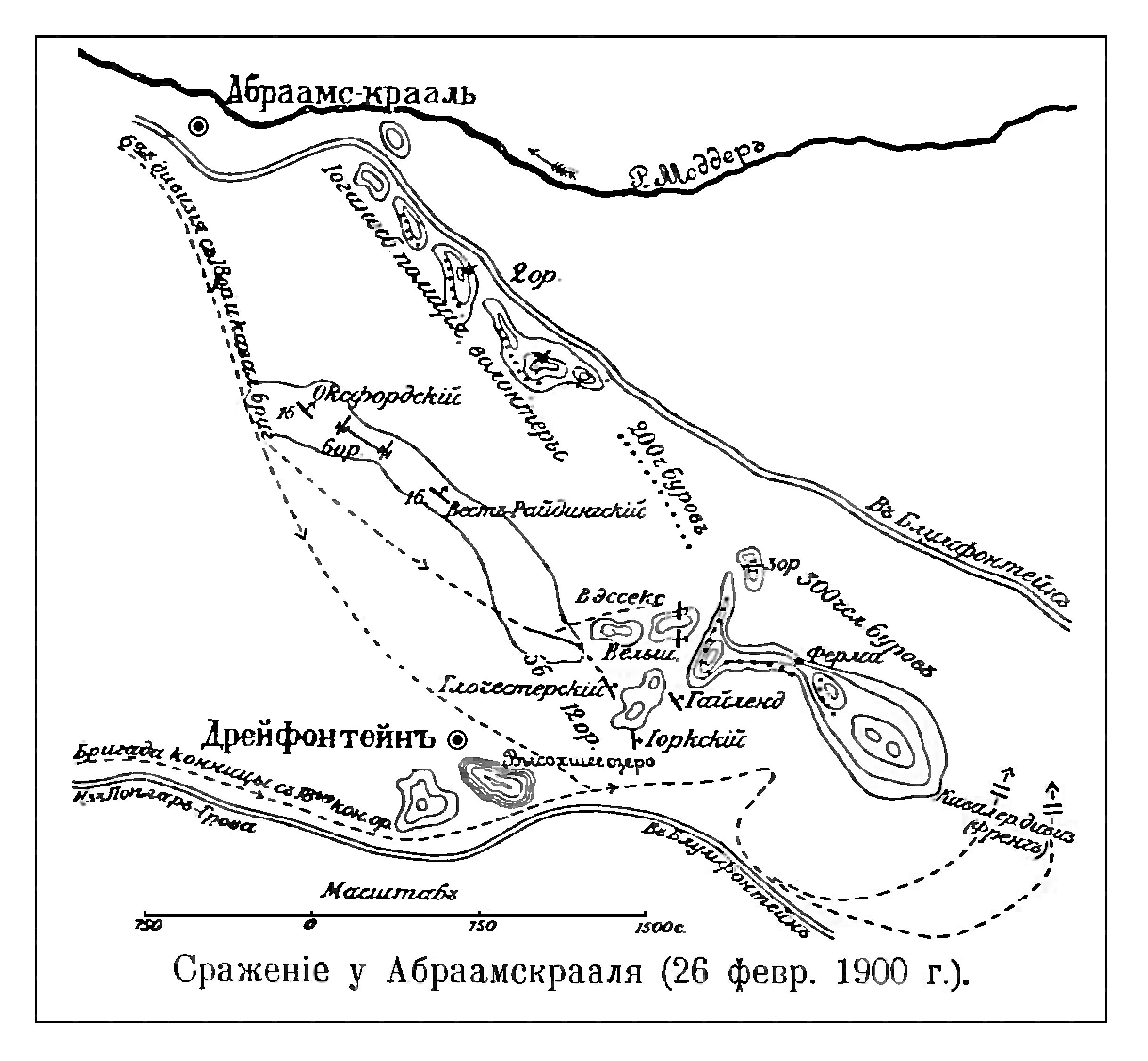
Date	10 March 1900
Location	near Bloemfontein, Orange Free State
Result	British victory

Belligerents
United Kingdom	South African Republic; Orange Free State

Commanders and leaders
Lord Roberts; Robert Broadwood; Thomas Kelly-Kenny	Christiaan de Wet

Strength
10,000	1,500 – 6,000; 2 Vickers guns

Casualties and losses
82 killed; 342 wounded	102 killed; 22 captured

The Battle of Driefontein on 10 March 1900 followed on the Battle of Poplar Grove in the Second Boer War between the United Kingdom and the Boer republics, in what is now South Africa. In the first half of 1900, the British made an offensive towards the two Boer republic capitals of Bloemfontein and Pretoria.

== Battle ==
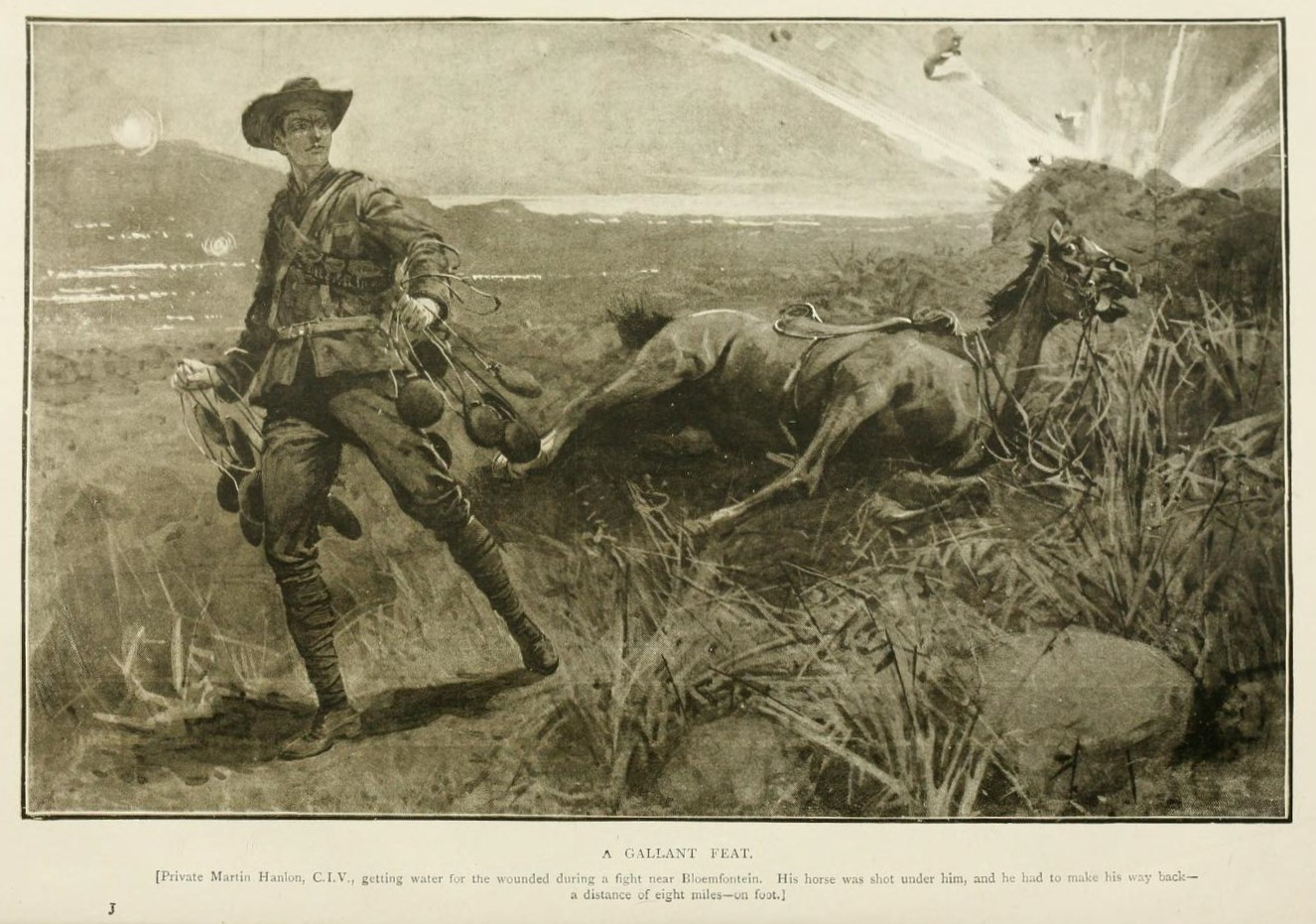
Original lithograph caption: A Gallant Feat. Private Martin Hanlon, C.I.V.

The Boer forces under the command of Christiaan de Wet were holding a 7-mile (11 km) line covering the approach to Bloemfontein. Lord Roberts subsequently ordered a division under Lieutenant General Thomas Kelly-Kenny to attack the position from the front, while Lieutenant General Charles Tucker's division moved against its left flank. The Boers were subsequently forced to withdraw losing 124 men killed and captured, while the British lost 82 killed and 342 wounded. The following two months saw Lord Roberts control the entire Orange Free State after driving the Boers out of Bloemfontein.

=== British Order of Battle ===
Order of Battle
Infantry units	Mounted units
1st Battalion Coldstream Guards	2nd Dragoons
1st Battalion Essex Regiment	6th Dragoons
1st Battalion Gordon Highlanders	14th Hussars
2nd Battalion East Kent Regiment	12th Lancers
1st Battalion Oxfordshire Light Infantry Regiment	16th Lancers
1st Battalion Welch Regiment	Royal Horse Guards
1st Battalion Yorkshire Regiment	1st Battalion Life Guards
	2nd Battalion Life Guards

== Citations ==
- Clodfelter, Micheal (2017). Warfare and Armed Conflicts: A Statistical Encyclopedia of Casualty and Other Figures, 1492–2015 (4th ed.). McFarland & Company. ISBN 978-0786474707.
- Laffin, John (1995) [1986]. Brassey's Battles: 3,500 Years of Conflict, Campaigns and Wars from A-Z. Brassey's. ISBN 1857531760.
