= Chris Botha =

Boer general of the Second Boer War (1864–1902)

Christiaan Botha

Personal details
- Born: Christiaan Botha; October 7, 1864 Greytown, Colony of Natal or Kokstad, Colony of Natal
- Died: October 29, 1902 (aged 38) Kokstad, Colony of Natal
- Spouse(s): Maria Elizabeth Rachel Johnstone (Kolbe) (KwaZulu-Natal, 28 July 1869-Winkelhoek, Utrecht, South Africa, 16 June 1928)
- Parent(s): Louis Botha and Salomina Adriana van Rooyen
- Occupation: police officer, general

Military service
- Allegiance: South African Republic
- Battles/wars: Second Boer War: –Battle of Colenso

Christiaan Botha (also Chris Botha and in English language literature mistakenly Christian Botha, 6 October 1864 – 29 October 1902) was a younger brother of Louis Botha (1862–1919) and Philip Botha (1851-1901), an older brother of Theunis Jacobus Botha (1867-1930), and likewise a Boer general in the Second Boer War (1899–1902) who then both fought the British to the end.

== Early years ==
Chris and Louis Botha were among the fifteen children born to Louis Botha senior (Somerset East, Cape, 26 March 1827–Harrismith, Orange Free State, 5 July 1883) and Salomina Adriana van Rooyen (Somerset East, 31 March 1829–Harrismith, 9 January 1885). They were the first inhabitants of the Boer Nieuwe Republiek (or Vrijheid Republiek, 1884-1888), which was incorporated in the South African Republic in 1888. Chris Botha was to father one son and two daughters by his spouse Maria Elizabeth Rachel Johnstone. In 1898 Botha became head officer of the police in Swaziland (later Eswatini).

== Second Boer War (1899–1902) ==
In the Second Boer War Christiaan Botha served the South African Republic on the front in the Colony of Natal against the British and took part in several battles, including the Battle of Colenso on 15 December 1899. On 16 February 1900 he escaped death when a liddite bomb exploded in a trench killing seven men. After the British victoriously ended the Siege of Ladysmith on 28 February 1900, Chris Botha retreated to Laing's Nek, where he was promoted to general. Botha however could not stop general Buller's advance in the Biggarsberg and Drakensberg mountains in May–June 1900. Buller outflanked some seven thousand Boers between 10–15 May 1900 who had dug into the Biggarsberg, and again on 6–12 June 1900 by passing Christiaan Botha's ten thousand Boers in the region near Majuba Hill. The Boers had built there many miles of entrenchments to secure the main passes such as Laing's Nek. But Buller's troops found a small pass over the Drakensbergen more to the west, and won a minor battle at Alleman's Nek 20 km to the west of Volksrust on 11 June 1900. They so outflanked Chris Botha and his men at Laing's Nek and could march into the Transvaal on to Standerton.

After the fall of Pretoria to the British on 5 June 1900 Chris Botha commanded the Boer forces fighting on in the eastern Transvaal. On 10 May 1901 he took part in a military council meeting near Ermelo with politicians and generals of the South African Republic: his brother general Louis Botha, the politicians Schalk Willem Burger and Francis William Reitz, and the generals Jan Smuts and Ben Viljoen. They wanted to consult president Paul Kruger in exile in the Netherlands for help and considered asking the British commander-in-chief, Kitchener, for a ceasefire in order to confer with the Boer people. In July 1901 Chris Botha as assistant commandant-general in the eastern Transvaal had to review the death sentence for treason of six National Scouts and sentenced five of them to be shot by a firing squad of their own commando. In February 1902, he was captured by British forces at Volksrust, tried as a rebel, and sentenced to 10 years in prison. He later joined the peace negotiations at Vereeniging and supported the loss of independence of the South African Republic to conclude the Treaty of Vereeniging on 31 May 1902.

Christiaan Botha died on 29 October 1902 in Kokstad, KwaZulu-Natal, South Africa, from wounds sustained during his capture.

== Literature ==
- Bossenbroek, M. P. and Rosenberg, Yvette (Translator), The Boer War, Seven Stories Press, New York, NY, 2018. ISBN 9781609807474, 1609807472. Pages 282, 338, 382.
- Breytenbach, J. H. (1971). Die eerste Britse offensief, Nov. – Des. 1899 [The first British offensive, Nov. – Dec. 1899]. Die Geskiedenis van die Tweede Vryheidsoorlog in Suid-Afrika, 1899–1902 (in Afrikaans). Vol. II. Pretoria: Die Staatsdrukker. Pages 250, 323, 485, and 488.
- Breytenbach, J. H. (1973). Die stryd in Natal, Jan. – Feb. 1900 [The battle in Natal, Jan. – Feb. 1900]. Die Geskiedenis van die Tweede Vryheidsoorlog in Suid-Afrika, 1899–1902 (in Afrikaans). Vol. III. Pretoria: Die Staatsdrukker. ISBN 9780797012394. OCLC 612581136. Pages 410, 414, and 451.
- Breytenbach, J. H. (1996). Die beleg van Mafeking tot met die Slag van Bergendal [The siege of Mafeking up to the Battle of Bergendal]. Die Geskiedenis van die Tweede Vryheidsoorlog in Suid-Afrika, 1899–1902 (in Afrikaans). Vol. VI. Pretoria: Die Staatsdrukker. ISBN 9780797033214. OCLC 813492747. Pages 86–89, 94, 101, 103-107, 109-110, 116-117, 121-122, 124-127, 129-137, 141-144, 146-152, 154-156, 159-160, 162, 208, 265, 271, 292-309, 311-316.
- Brits JP (1977). "Botha, Christiaan". In De Kock WJ, Krüger DW, Beyers CJ, Basson JL (eds.). Dictionary of South African Biography Vol III (1st ed.). Cape Town: Tafelberg-Uitgewers. pp. 89–90. ISBN 0624008495. OCLC 1063845175.
- Grobler, J. E. H., The War Reporter: the Anglo-Boer war through the eyes of the burghers, Johannesburg: Jonathan Ball Publishers, 2004. ISBN 978-1-86842-186-2. Pages 23, 44, 68-70, 75, 78, 80, 87-88, 90, 114-115, 124, and 134.
- Pakenham, Thomas, The Boer War, George Weidenfeld & Nicolson, London, 1979. Abacus, 1992. ISBN 0 349 10466 2. Page 453.
