= Philip Botha =

Philip Rudolf Botha
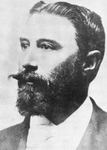
- Philip Rudolph Botha (1851-1901)

Personal details
- Born: June 30, 1851 Greytown, Colony of Natal
- Died: March 6, 1901 (aged 49) killed in action at Doornberg, Ventersburg, South Africa
- Spouse(s): Magdalena Maria Wessels (Pietermaritzburg, circa October 1854 – buried Vrede, Orange Free State, March 1930
- Parent(s): Louis Botha and Salomina Adriana van Rooyen
- Occupation: Boer war general

Military service
- Allegiance: Orange Free State
- Battles/wars: Second Boer War: –Battle of Poplar Grove 7 March 1900, Fredericksdale 3 January 1901 and others.

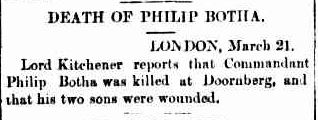
Newspaper report on the death of Philip Botha, The Sydney Morning Herald, March 23, 1901.

Philip Rudolph Botha (30 June 1851 – 6 March 1901) was a Second Boer War general, like his younger brothers Louis (1862-1919), Christiaan (1864–1902) and Theunis Jacobus (1867–1930).

== Early years ==
Philip was the eldest son among seven sons and eight daughters born to Louis Botha Senior (Somerset East, Eastern Cape, 26 March 1827 – Harrismith, Orange Free State, 5 July 1883) and Salomina Adriana van Rooyen (Somerset East, 31 March 1829 – Harrismith, 9 January 1886). He migrated with his parents from Natal Colony to Vrede in the Orange Free State. Botha married Magdalena Maria Wessels and had at least four daughters and five sons by her, including the later general "Manie" Botha (Hermanus Nicolaas Wilhelm, 1877-1950), who fought in the Second Boer War, the First World War - for the Union of South Africa against the Germans in the South West Africa campaign (1914-1915) - and the Second World War.

== Second Boer War ==
At the outbreak of the Second Boer War Philip Botha volunteered as a soldier for the Orange Free State and became leader of the Kroonstad Commando. In 1900, he was appointed fighting general (Afrikaans:Veggeneraal) and Assistant Chief Commandant under Christiaan de Wet, tried in vain to break the encirclement of Piet Cronjé and his troops at Paardeberg and fought in the Battle of Poplar Grove on 7 March 1900. With de Wet and Free State president Steyn Philip Botha and his troops managed to escape from the Brandwater Basin over the Slabbert's Nek mountain pass on 15 July 1900, while Marthinus Prinsloo remained and surrendered with some 4300 troops to the British on 30 July 1900.

In January 1901 Philip Botha ordered the execution of British Lieutenant Cecil Boyle who was accused of ill treatment of Boer women and children in Dewetsdorp. Botha was called upon to account for this, but was killed in action in a small skirmish with British troops at Doornberg near Ventersdorp on 6 March 1901.

== Literature ==
- Breytenbach J.H., Die Geskiedenis van die Tweede Vryheidsoorlog in Suid-Afrika,
  - volume IV. Die Boereterugtog uit Kaapland, Die Staatsdrukker Pretoria, 1977. Philip Botha is mentioned on 33 pages from pages 310-311 up to pages 477-481 and 487.
  - volume V. Die Britse Opmars tot in Pretoria, Die Staatsdrukker Pretoria, 1983. Philip Botha is mentioned on 44 pages from page 29 up to page 477.
- Brits JP (1981). "Botha, Philip Rudolph". In De Kock WJ, Krüger DW, Beyers CJ, Basson JL (eds.). Dictionary of South African Biography Vol IV (1st ed.). Cape Town: Tafelberg-Uitgewers. pp. 89–90. ISBN 0409 09183 9. OCLC 1063845175.
- J. E. H. Grobler, The War Reporter: the Anglo-Boer war through the eyes of the burghers, Johannesburg: Jonathan Ball Publishers, 2004. ISBN 978-1-86842-186-2. Pages 45, 47-49, 54, 61, 64-65, 67, 77, 100, 107, 111.
- Thomas Pakenham, The Boer War, George Weidenfeld & Nicolson, London, 1979. Abacus, 1992. ISBN 0 349 10466 2. Pages 332 and 390.
