= Wessel Jacobus Wessels =

Boer general (1865 - 1945)

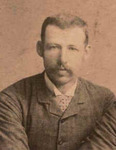

Boer War General of the Orange Free State

Personal details
- Born: 27 April 1865 Harrismith, Orange Free State
- Died: 19 January 1945 (aged 79) Reitz, Orange Free State, South Africa
- Spouse: Susanna Magdalena Wessels
- Profession: Boer general

Military service
- Allegiance: Orange Free State; Union of South Africa
- Years of service: 1899–1902
- Commands: Harrismith Kommando, Orange Free State general
- Battles/wars: Second Boer War; Maritz rebellion

Wessel Jacobus Wessels (27 April 1865 – 19 January 1945) was a Boer general during the Anglo Boer War (1899–1902). He was one of the eleven children of Hermanus Nicolaas ("Bont Hermaans") Wessels (Grahamstown, 8 October 1822 – Harrismith, 18 February 1886) and Johanna Wilhelmina Elizabeth Catharina Wessels (birth place unknown, 14 June 1833 – buried at Harrismith, died 4 April 1921). He wed Susanna Magdalena Wessels (birth place unknown, 2 December 1871 – death place and date unknown) and had five daughters and four sons by her. Wessel Jacobus Wessels should not be confused with Cornelis (Kerneels) Janse Wessels (11 June 1842 – 10 October 1914), who commanded the Boer army at the siege of Kimberley in October 1899 – January 1900.

== Boer War ==
At the outbreak of the war Wessel Jacobus Wessels was sent to the front in the Colony of Natal with his Harrismith Commando. He participated in the Boer victory of the Battle of Sanna's Post (Sannaspos, 31 March 1900) with his own troops, combined with those of general Froneman and general Piet de Wet. Their total of 1,150 men had dug in in the Modder River bank. Later he fought in Orange Free State under general Marthinus Prinsloo. When Prinsloo surrendered to British general Archibald Hunter in the Brandwater Basin with some 4300 troops on 30 July 1900, Wessels managed to escape.

He was subsequently promoted to commander of the Harrismith Commando. In February 1901 Wessels joined general Christiaan de Wet in his invasion of the Cape Colony. In March 1901 he became assistant commander of the Vrede district, as one of the seven assistant commanders in Orange Free State. Later, in the night of 3 September 1901 Wessels crossed the Orange River with general Jan Smuts at Kiba Drift to invade the Eastern Cape again, after the failed raids of Christiaan de Wet, J. B. M. Hertzog and Pieter Hendrik Kritzinger. According to British counterinsurgency field intelligence of general French, Wessels commanded some 200 men, as one of seven separate Boer commands invading the Cape in September 1901 with a combined strength of about a thousand troops. In this final year of the war Wessels and his men fought several skirmishes with British forces but they evaded their large clean up operations.

Wessels was one of the sixty Boer delegates at the Treaty of Vereeniging and voted for the peace. He later participated in the Maritz rebellion and was sentenced to five years in prison for treason. Wessels died on 19 January 1945 in Reitz, Free State.

== Literature ==
- M. P. Bossenbroek, Yvette Rosenberg (Translator), The Boer War, Seven Stories Press, New York, NY, 2018. ISBN 9781609807474, 1609807472. The overall background of the Anglo-Boer War.
- J. E. H. Grobler, The War Reporter: the Anglo-Boer war through the eyes of the burghers, Johannesburg: Jonathan Ball Publishers, 2004. ISBN 978-1-86842-186-2. Pages 100, 107,132, 137, and 149.
- Thomas Pakenham, The Boer War, George Weidenfeld & Nicolson, London, 1979. Abacus, 1992. ISBN 0 349 10466 2. Pages 393, 519, and 526.
