= David Wessel =

American journalist and writer (born 1954)

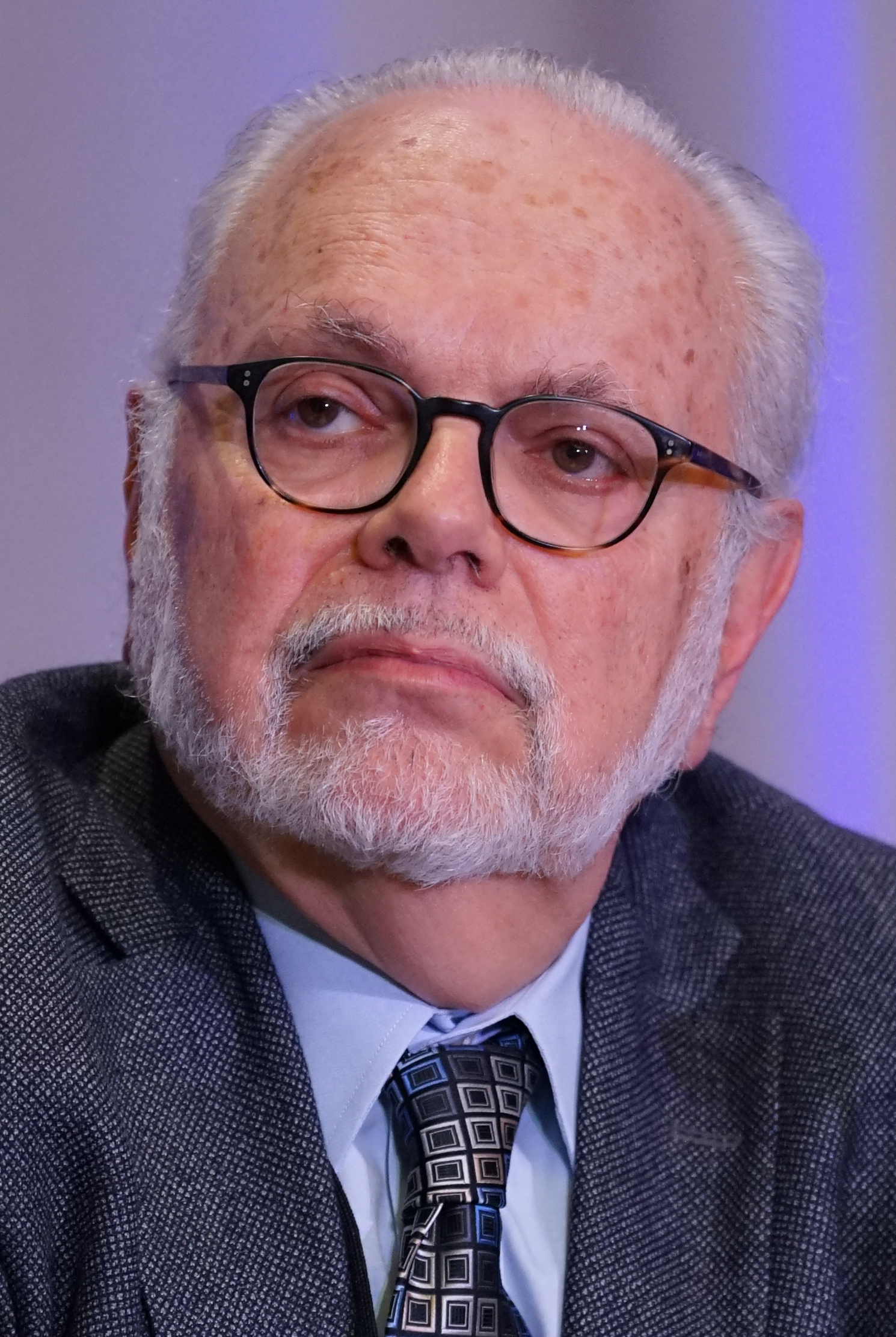
- Wessel at ASSA 2026
- Born: David Meyer Wessel; February 21, 1954 (age 72)
- Education: Haverford College (BA)
- Occupation: Economics journalist
- Relatives: Morris A. Wessel (father)
- Awards: Pulitzer Prize for Investigative Reporting (1984)

David Meyer Wessel (born February 21, 1954) is an American journalist and writer. He has shared two Pulitzer Prizes for journalism. He is director of the Hutchins Center on Fiscal & Monetary Policy at the Brookings Institution and a contributing correspondent to The Wall Street Journal, where he worked for 30 years. Wessel appears frequently on National Public Radio's Morning Edition.

== Biography ==
Wessel is a native of New Haven, Connecticut. He is the son of Morris A. Wessel, a pediatrician, and Irmgard R. Wessel, a clinical social worker. Wessel graduated from New Haven's Richard C. Lee High School in 1971 and from Haverford College in 1975, where he majored in economics. In 2009, he was awarded an honorary doctorate in humane letters by Eureka College.

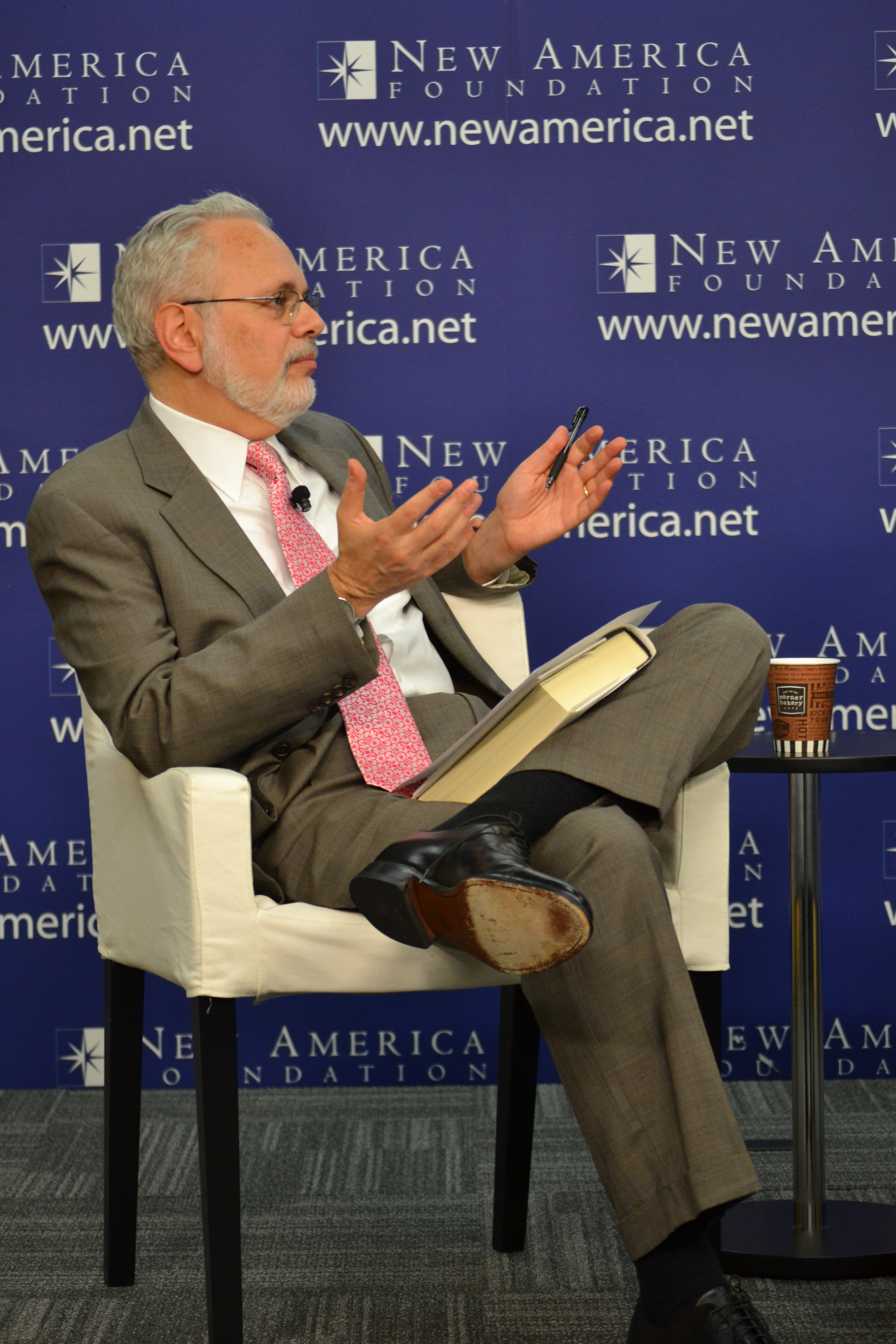
Wessel in 2013

Wessel began his reporting career at the Middletown, Connecticut Press in 1975 and joined the staff of the Hartford Courant in 1977. He left Hartford in 1980 to spend a year as a Knight-Bagehot Fellow in Business and Economics Journalism at Columbia's Graduate School of Journalism. He moved to The Boston Globe in 1981 and was hired in 1983 as a reporter in The Wall Street Journal's Boston bureau. He transferred to the Washington, D.C. bureau in 1987 and worked there for the duration of his time at the WSJ, except for a brief period as the paper's Berlin bureau chief in 1999–2000.

On December 4, 2013, The Brookings Institution announced that Wessel would become the founding director of its new Hutchins Center on Fiscal and Monetary Policy.

Wessel and his wife Naomi Karp, formerly a senior policy analyst at the Consumer Financial Protection Bureau's Office for Older Americans, have two children, Julia and Ben.

== Awards ==
Wessel has shared two Pulitzer Prizes for journalism. In 1984, The Boston Globe and seven of its staff won the Pulitzer Prize for Local Investigative Specialized Reporting, citing a 1983 "series examining race relations in Boston, a notable exercise in public service that turned a searching gaze on some the city's most honored institutions including The Globe itself". The series highlighted the persistence of racism in employment in Boston.

He and others on the WSJ staff were nominated for Public Service in 2003 but awarded the Pulitzer Prize for Explanatory Reporting, citing "clear, concise and comprehensive stories that illuminated the roots, significance and impact of corporate scandals in America".

== Works ==
Wessel is the author of several books and the editor of Central Banking after the Great Recession (2014), which features an interview between Ben Bernanke and Liaquat Ahamed as well as chapters by John C. Williams, Donald Kohn, and Paul Tucker.

Prosperity: The Coming 20-Year Boom and What It Means for You (1998), co-written with Bob Davis, is a look at the prospects for the American middle class. In Fed We Trust: Ben Bernanke's War on the Great Panic (2009), a New York Times Best Seller, chronicles the Federal Reserve's response to the 2008 financial crisis. Michiko Kakutani's review in The New York Times calls it "essential, lucid—and, it turns out, riveting—reading". Red Ink: Inside the High-Stakes Politics of the Federal Budget is a primer on the federal budget and the deficit, published in July 2012 by Crown Business. Wessel's latest book Only the Rich Can Play: How Washington Works in the New Gilded Age, the story of Opportunity Zones, was published in October 2021 by PublicAffairs. "He has a reporters eye for detail, an ability to tell the story in an exciting way, but also blends in rigorous policy analytics and a certain degree of sympathy and open mindedness--while being willing to make the calls when they are obvious," Jason Furman wrote about the book.
