= National Scouts =

- Active: 1900 – 1902
- Country: Transvaal Colony and Orange River Colony
- Branch: British Army
- Role: Reconnaissance; Patrolling
- Size: 1,480 men (May 1902); 1,750 men (total)
- Nickname(s): Joiners

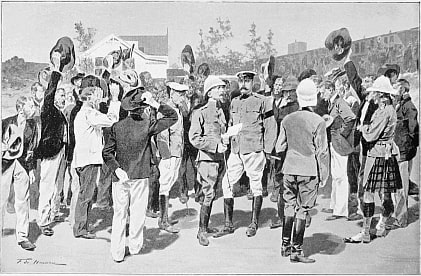
Frédéric de Haenen: "Surrendered Boers at Belfast anxious to join the National Scouts after being addressed by Lord Kitchener." Drawing after a photograph of a scene in the aftermath of the Battle of Belfast, 21 - 27 August 1900, lost by the Boers.

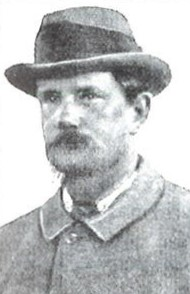
Boer general Pieter Daniel de Wet.

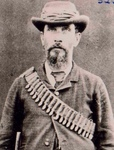
Boer general Andries Cronjé with ammunition.

The National Scouts were a military unit in South Africa created by the British authorities in 1900 during the Second Boer War (11 October 1899 – 31 May 1902). Its membership consisted of former Boer Orange Free State and South African Republic military. They were recruited in significant numbers towards the end of the war from Afrikaner prisoners and defectors, and were commonly known as hensoppers (Afrikaans for Hands-uppers) or joiners among the Boers. Many of their fellow citizens despised them as traitors so that the label of National Scout became a swear word. According to official figures there were 1,480 members in May 1902. After the war, they were largely ostracized by the community and a number of them founded their own church, known as the Kruiskerk (Church of the Cross) in the Transvaal Colony.

== Second Boer War ==
A few months after the occupation of Pretoria by the British forces on 5 June 1900, a first public meeting was held in the Rex Bar at Kerkplein in Pretoria to recruit National Scouts from the ranks of the citizens. In most cases, they were initially employed as "cattle guards" (Afrikaans: beeswagters) to collect and protect the livestock of farms against seizure by roaming Boer commandos. However, some took part in military action against them.

The so-called hensoppers were men who had surrendered immediately to the enemy, sometimes even before the actual start of hostilities, or later after only a short time in the field. The joiners on the other hand were Boers who offered their services to the enemy by acting as National Scouts or guides to the British troops in the field.

Prominent members of the National Scouts were former Boer generals Andries Cronjé (1849 – 1923), brother of general Piet Cronjé, who had surrendered at Paardeberg and was sent to Saint Helena, and Piet de Wet (1861 – 1929), brother of general Christiaan de Wet, who kept up a guerrilla war against the British.

The hostility ran high among the Boer population against those joiners, which was summed up in a poem sent to the National Scouts' membership during the war:

(Afrikaans original:)
Verraders! Monsters! Vloek der Aarde:
Verneerde schepsels der natuur:
Gods waken die u tot heden spaarde:
Verdelg u eens door Helsche Vuur

—Anonymous

(Translation:)
Traitors! Monsters! Curse of the Earth:
Despicable creatures of nature:
God's watch that spared you until now:
By Hellfire sometime should eradicate you

== Aftermath ==
After the Boer War, only 10 percent of the total of 1,750 Boers serving on the British side as National Scouts claimed their Queen's South Africa Medals. Ostracized by the Boer Bittereinders and their womenfolk, they had to found their own separate Afrikander church organisation, the Kruiskerk (Church of the Cross) in Pretoria. Towards the end of 1902, General Louis Botha decided to destroy the list of National Scouts compiled by the Boers during the war, to so keep their descendants in ignorance about their actions during the war.

== Sources ==
- Johanna Brandt (1913). "The Petticoat Commando: Boer Women in Secret Service". gutenberg.org. Mills & Boon Ltd, 49 Rupert Street, London. "The first downward step to becoming a National Scout was the voluntary surrendering of arms to the enemy, to become a "handsupper," as the burghers were called, who laid down their arms while the Boer leaders were still in the field. There were three kinds of handsuppers; .... third, the men who, through their lust for gain, fell an easy prey to the temptations offered them in gold and spoil by the enemy, surrendering their trusty Mausers in exchange for the Lee Metfords of the enemy, with whom they thereafter stood, side by side, in infernal warfare against kith and kin. To the latter class of handsuppers the National Scouts, better known throughout the war as "Judas-Boers," belonged." Chapter 15. The Formation of the National Scouts Corps.
- Eric Rosenthal (Ed.), Ensiklopedie van Suidelike Afrika, London: Frederick Warne, 1967. ISBN 9780723201441. In Afrikaans.
- "Nordisk familjebok, National Scouts 545-546". runeberg.org (in Norwegian). 1913. "National scouts var benämningen på de frikårer, hvilka under boerkrigets sista skede uppsattes bland boer,..."

== See also ==
- Lovat Scouts, a similar British Army unit first formed during the Second Boer War as a Scottish Highland yeomanry regiment.
