= Piet de Wet =

Boer general (1861–1929)

Pieter Daniël de Wet
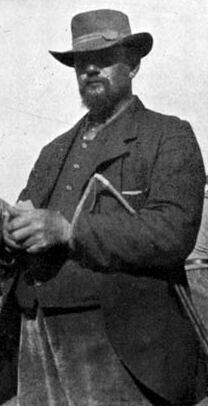

Personal details
- Born: 18 August 1861 Dewetsdorp, Orange Free State
- Died: 27 February 1929 (aged 67) Lindley, Orange Free State, Union of South Africa
- Spouse(s): Susanna Margaretha de Wet (18 September 1865, Kroonstad, Orange Free State, South Africa – 26 August 1924)
- Profession: farmer, boer commander and general

Military service
- Allegiance: Orange Free State (1880–1900); United Kingdom (1900–1902)
- Years of service: 1880–1902
- Rank: Commander, General
- Commands: First Boer War (1880–1881), Second Boer War (1899–1902)

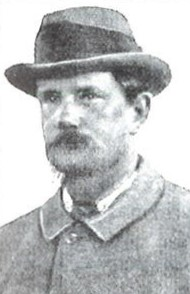
Piet de Wet from Darrell Hall: The Hall Handbook, 1999.

Pieter Daniël de Wet (18 August 1861 – 27 February 1929) was a Boer general in the Anglo-Boer War (1899–1902) and a younger brother of Boer general and politician Christiaan de Wet. Piet de Wet participated in the Battle of Poplar Grove (7 March 1900), the Battle of Sanna's Post (Sannaspos, 31 March 1900) for the waterworks there, and defeated the 13th Battalion Imperial Yeomanry at Lindley (31 May 1900). In July 1900, he surrendered to the British at Kroonstad, Orange Free State. He became a prominent member of the National Scouts helping the British in the last years of the Boer War.

== Early career ==
De Wet was born at the farm Nuwejaarsfontein in Dewetsdorp as one of the fourteen children of Jacobus Ignatius de Wet (13 July 1823, Boonjieskraal, Caledon, Western Cape – 1891, Dewetsdorp) and Aletta Susanna Margaretha Strydom (28 February 1828, Caledon – 16 May 1870, Dewetsdorp). With his older brother Christiaan he left the Orange Free State in 1879 for the Heidelberg district in the South African Republic. Both brothers fought in the First Boer War (1880–1881) at the Battle of Majuba Hill and Piet de Wet participated in the expedition to capture Mampuru II.

In 1883, he returned to the Orange Free State, settled at the farm Vinkfontein near Lindley and married Susanna Margaretha de Wet (18 September 1865, Kroonstad, Orange Free State, South Africa – 26 August 1924). They had five sons and six daughters. De Wet represented Midden-Liebensbergvlei-wyk in the Volksraad from 1895 to 1897, moved to Pretoria, but came back and became military commander (veldkornet, field cornet) for Lindley.

== Anglo-Boer War 1899–1902 ==
=== Success ===
Piet de Wet led his 200 men of the Bethlehem Commando near Nicholson's Nek outside Ladysmith on 5 October 1899 and during the siege of Ladysmith. Then he was tasked to march west and attack Vaalkop near Arundel on 16 December 1899. He impressed president Steyn of the Free State who gave him the command of all troops south of the Orange River with headquarter at Colesberg. British troops continued their advance and occupied Bloemfontein, the capital of Orange Free State, on 13 March 1900. On 28 May Orange Free State was annexed by Lord Roberts as the Orange River Colony. But in the mean time the brothers Christiaan and Piet de Wet won skirmishes with the British at Abrahamkraal (10 March), Sanna's Post (Sannaspost, 31 March) and Dewetsdorp (20 April). On 31 May 1900 Piet de Wet with General Marthinus Prinsloo captured 13th Battalion Imperial Yeomanry near Lindley. Piet de Wet bagged in total 530 men, including Spragge, Lord Longford, Lords Ennismore, Leitrim and Donoughmore (and the future Lord Craigavon) who were marched off to the eastern Transvaal northwards. However, after the occupation by Roberts of Kroonstad on 12 May 1900, Free State soldiers were disheartenend and Piet de Wet had started to doubt the use of fighting on. Roberts occupied and Pretoria on 5 June 1900.

=== Surrender ===
On 18 May 1900, British brigade general Robert Broadwood received a message that Piet de Wet was willing to surrender on the condition that he and his men could return to their farms. However, Commander-in-chief Roberts demanded an unconditional surrender so that the fighting continued. But in July 1900, Piet de Wet and several of his staff surrendered to the British at Kroonstad, becoming "joiners", "hensoppers" (hands-upper), and "wapenneerlêers" (who put down their weapons). His unavailing letter of 11 January 1901 to his brother Christiaan de Wet to stop his guerrilla war, was published in the Bloemfontein Post and separately as a pamphlet "Broeder tot broeder" (Brother to brother). In March 1902 Piet de Wet established the Orange River Colony Volunteers on the British side. and had joined the National Scouts headed by Andries Cronjé (1849 – 1923), who served the British troops as Boer auxiliaries. However, on 9 April 1902, peace negotiations started at Vereeniging leading to the Treaty of Vereeniging on 31 May 1902 ending the war.

== Publications ==
- Broeder tot broeder : een prijzenswaardige brief [aan zijn broeder, Kommandant Christiaan De Wet gezonden]; een smeekstem tot De Wet [en] De Wet's verantwoordelijkheid, 1901.
- with Kroonstad Vredes Comité (translation: Kroonstad Peace Committee), Open brief aan de inwoners der Kaap Kolonie, Die Comité, Kroonstad, 1901.
- The Marits conspiracy : negotiations with German South West during 1913, Wallachs, Pretoria, 1915.

== Bibliography ==
- Bossenbroek, M.P., Yvette Rosenberg (Translator), The Boer War, Seven Stories Press, New York, NY, 2018. ISBN 9781609807474, 1609807472. Pages 229, 231, 240, 277–279, 314–315, 383.
- Breytenbach, J. H. (1969–1996). Die Geskiedenis van die Tweede Vryheidsoorlog in Suid-Afrika, 1899–1902 [The History of the Second War of Independence in South Africa, 1899–1902] (in Afrikaans). Pretoria: Die Staatsdrukker.
  - Breytenbach, J. H. (1969). Die Boere-offensief, Okt. – Nov. 1899 [The Boer Offensive, Oct. – Nov. 1899]. Die Geskiedenis van die Tweede Vryheidsoorlog in Suid-Afrika, 1899–1902 (in Afrikaans). Vol. I. Pretoria: Die Staatsdrukker. OCLC 798106662. Pages 353, 457.
  - Breytenbach, J. H. (1971). Die eerste Britse offensief, Nov. – Des. 1899 [The first British offensive, Nov. – Dec. 1899]. Die Geskiedenis van die Tweede Vryheidsoorlog in Suid-Afrika, 1899–1902 (in Afrikaans). Vol. II. Pretoria: Die Staatsdrukker. Page 428? ("veldcornet De Wet").
  - Breytenbach, J. H. (1977). Die Boereterugtog uit Kaapland [The Boer retreat from the Cape Colony]. Die Geskiedenis van die Tweede Vryheidsoorlog in Suid-Afrika, 1899–1902 (in Afrikaans). Vol. IV. Pretoria: Die Staatsdrukker. Pages 10, 16-18, 29-30, 36, 42, 45, 47, 49, 56-57, 70, 94, 145-147, 149-150, 152-153, 158, 161, 196, 237, 432, 440-441, 443-445, 450, 459, Photo no. 4.
  - Breytenbach, J. H. (1983). Die Britse Opmars tot in Pretoria [The British advance to Pretoria]. Die Geskiedenis van die Tweede Vryheidsoorlog in Suid-Afrika, 1899–1902 (in Afrikaans). Vol. V. Pretoria: Die Staatsdrukker. ISBN 9780621083606. OCLC 769254652. Pages 37, 42, 59, 116, 193, 198, 202-203, 205-206, 209, 211, 220-221, 224, 262-265, 282, 294, 297, 301-303, 305-306, 309-312, 316-317, 458, 461, 463, 466, 505-508, 510. Failed attempt to surrender at p. 506.
  - Breytenbach, J. H. (1996). Die beleg van Mafeking tot met die Slag van Bergendal [The siege of Mafeking up to the Battle of Bergendal]. Die Geskiedenis van die Tweede Vryheidsoorlog in Suid-Afrika, 1899–1902 (in Afrikaans). Vol. VI. Pretoria: Die Staatsdrukker. ISBN 9780797033214. OCLC 813492747. Pages 210-211, 213, 236.
- Hall, Darrell, The Hall Handbook of the Anglo-Boer War, 1899–1902, Pietermaritzburg: University of Natal Press, 1999. ISBN 9780869809495. Pages 23 and 148.
- Pakenham, Thomas, The Boer War, George Weidenfeld & Nicolson, London, 1979. Abacus, 1992. ISBN 0 349 10466 2. Pages 393, 424, 436–437, 488, 542, 568.
- van Rensburg A (1972). "De Wet, Pieter Daniël". In De Kock WJ, Krüger DW (eds.). Dictionary of South African Biography Vol II (1st ed.). Cape Town: Tafelberg-Uitgewers. pp. 192–194. ISBN 0624003698. OCLC 1063845175.
