= Morris Wessel =

American pediatrician (1917–2016)

Morris Arthur Wessel (November 1, 1917 – August 20, 2016) was an American pediatrician who practiced in New Haven, Connecticut from 1951 to 1993. He was a professor of pediatrics at the Yale School of Medicine. He was known as "a pediatrician who treated not just the children but the whole family."

In 1954, he offered a widely accepted definition of "colic": a healthy baby with periods of intense, unexplained fussing and crying lasting more than 3 hours a day, more than 3 days a week, for more than 3 weeks.

Together with Anthony Dominski, Ph.D, he investigated lead levels in children in the 1970s and recommended a level then thought to be unrealistically low. Eventually the American Academy of Pediatrics recommended an even lower level. With former Yale School of Nursing Dean Florence Wald he studied the treatment of terminally ill patients, which Wald believed was often futile and dehumanizing. Wald told Wessel his role would be to help her understand doctors' thinking. "I can't explain why doctors do what they do," he told her. But he agreed to help. Their work led to the opening of the nation’s first hospice, in Connecticut, in 1974.

In 1997, Wessel was awarded the American Academy of Pediatrics' C. Anderson Aldrich Award, which recognizes achievement by a physician in the field of child development. "My goal was to use my relationship to families to enhance the capacities of parents and children to meet as effectively as possible stresses in their lives," he said in his acceptance speech. "I feel very much a part of a timeless continuity of values that binds pediatricians together as we care for children and families." The Morris Wessel Fund, a donor advised fund of the New Haven Community Foundation, makes an award to an "unsung hero" in New Haven each year.

== Biography ==
Wessel, born in Providence, Rhode Island, was the sole child of Morris J. Wessel, who died in the influenza epidemic of 1918, and Bessie Bloom Wessel, a sociologist who was on the faculty of Connecticut College. Wessel graduated from Johns Hopkins University in 1939 and received his M.D. from Yale Medical School in 1943. He joined the United States Army Medical Corps and served with the 121st General Hospital at Bremerhaven, Germany, where he became a captain. After leaving the Army, he became a pediatric fellow at the Mayo Clinic in Rochester, Minnesota, because of his interest in Mayo's Rochester Child Health Project. Three months after he arrived there, the noted pediatrician Ben Spock joined the project and he became, in Wessel's recollection, "a vitally important mentor for me."

As a research fellow at Yale in 1948, Wessel joined in the landmark "rooming-in" study by the late clinical professor Edith B. Jackson, M.D., which examined how keeping newborns in their mothers’ hospital rooms affected families. His participation in the study also helped Wessel decide what kind of pediatrician he wanted to be. His role in the study was to interview parents during pregnancy. Mothers- and fathers-to-be often burst into tears as they recounted traumatic childhood incidents such as the death of a parent. "Is there any way that we as pediatricians could support families during a crisis like that?" he asked himself.

When Wessel retired from his private practice in 1993 after 42 years, hundreds of people celebrated Morris Wessel Day in New Haven's Edgerton Park. He continued to work as a consultant to the Clifford Beers Clinic, the oldest outpatient behavioral health clinic in the United States, and retired from that post in 1997. At that time, the clinic named its national trauma center the Morris Wessel Child and Family Trauma Center of the Clifford Beers Clinic. In 1995, he received an honorary degree from Connecticut College.

Wessel was married to Irmgard Rosenzweig Wessel (1925–2014), a clinical social worker who fled Hitler and emigrated to the United States from Kassel, Germany, as a teenager. The couple have four children, David, Bruce, Paul and Lois. Wessel died in August 2016 at his home in New Haven at the age of 98.
