= Ellisif Wessel =

Norwegian writer, trade unionist and politician

Ellisif Ranveig Wessel, née Müller (14 July 1866 – 28 November 1949) was a Norwegian writer, trade unionist and politician for the Labour Party.

== Biography ==
She was born in Østre Gausdal Municipality as a daughter of district physician Wilhelm Jacobi Müller (1830–1909) and Hansine Pauline Ross (1830–1907). The family moved three times before she was ten, but she finished middle school at Nissen School in 1882. In March 1886 in Dovre Municipality she married her first cousin Andreas Wessel (1858–1940), a newly educated physician. The couple moved to Kirkenes, where Wessel had been hired as district physician of Sør-Varanger Municipality. They had seven children, but all died young.

She started a documentary effort, especially as a photographer of the scenery and human life. Her documentation of the Sami culture, among others in the 1902 book Fra vor grændse mod Rusland, has been deemed "invaluable". When travelling around she also became more aware of the widespread poverty in the region, and became a political activist. Having voted Liberal in her early adulthood, she aligned with the Labour Party from 1904.

Her political activism, together with her husband who was elected mayor, was widespread. They invited public speakers ("agitators") and housed Russian refugees after the failed 1905 revolution. She translated revolutionary literature from Russian and German, and in 1906 she was a driving force in founding the local trade union, Nordens Klippe where she became both secretary and treasurer.

She contributed to the labour movement's newspapers and periodicals, but was controversial. She is mentioned in most books on the Norwegian Worker's Movement as well as many books on Northern Norwegian history. As a result, she ran her own periodical Klasse mot Klasse in 1914 and 1915. In 1914 she also issued the socialist children's book, Den lille socialist. She was also a published poet, with Vinter og Vaar (1903), Nye smaavers (1904) and Det kalder. Digte (1930), the first two on Aschehoug. She gradually aligned more and more with the syndicalists, contributing to the publications Revolt, Direkte Aktion, Solidaritet and Alarm. After the Russian Revolution she and her husband supported the Soviet Union, but never joined the Communist Party.

She died in 1949 at Kirkenes, and was buried in the town, where her grave is visited by a parade on May Day.
