= Andreas Wessel =

Norwegian physician and politician

Andreas Bredal Wessel (7 May 1858 – 7 April 1940) was a Norwegian physician and politician for the Labour Party.

He was born in the city of Bergen as a son of engineer Peter Mathias Wessel (1821–1890) and Mathilde Cecilie Ross (1829–1902). He grew up in Fredrikstad, where he took the examen artium in 1877. He enrolled in medicine studies at the Royal Frederick University, whence he graduated with the cand.med. degree in 1885. In March 1886 in Dovre Municipality he married his first cousin Ellisif Müller (1866–1949). The newly married couple moved to the town of Kirkenes, where Wessel had been hired as district physician of Sør-Varanger Municipality. They had seven children, but all died young.

Wessel served as deputy mayor of Sør-Varanger Municipality from 1892 to 1898, and deputy representative to the Parliament of Norway for the constituency Finmarkens Amt during the term 1895–1897. He represented the Conservative Party.

When mining commenced in Sør-Varanger, the conservative Wessel became more aware of poverty and its detrimental medical effects, and aligned with the Labour Party. He was elected mayor and served from 1905 to 1910, and in the 1906 Norwegian parliamentary election he was elected deputy representative to the Parliament of Norway again, this time from the constituency Øst-Finmarken as a running mate of Isak Saba. His wife was also an important political activist in the region.

From 1918 to 1927 he served as county physician of Finnmark. He was also an amateur anthropologist, ornithologist and local historian. In 1930 he was decorated as a Knight, First Class of the Order of St. Olav. He died in Kirkenes in April 1940, two days before the German invasion of Norway.
