= Battle of Poplar Grove =

1900 battle of the Second Boer War

Battle of Poplar Grove (Slag van Modderrivierpoort)
- Part of Second Boer War
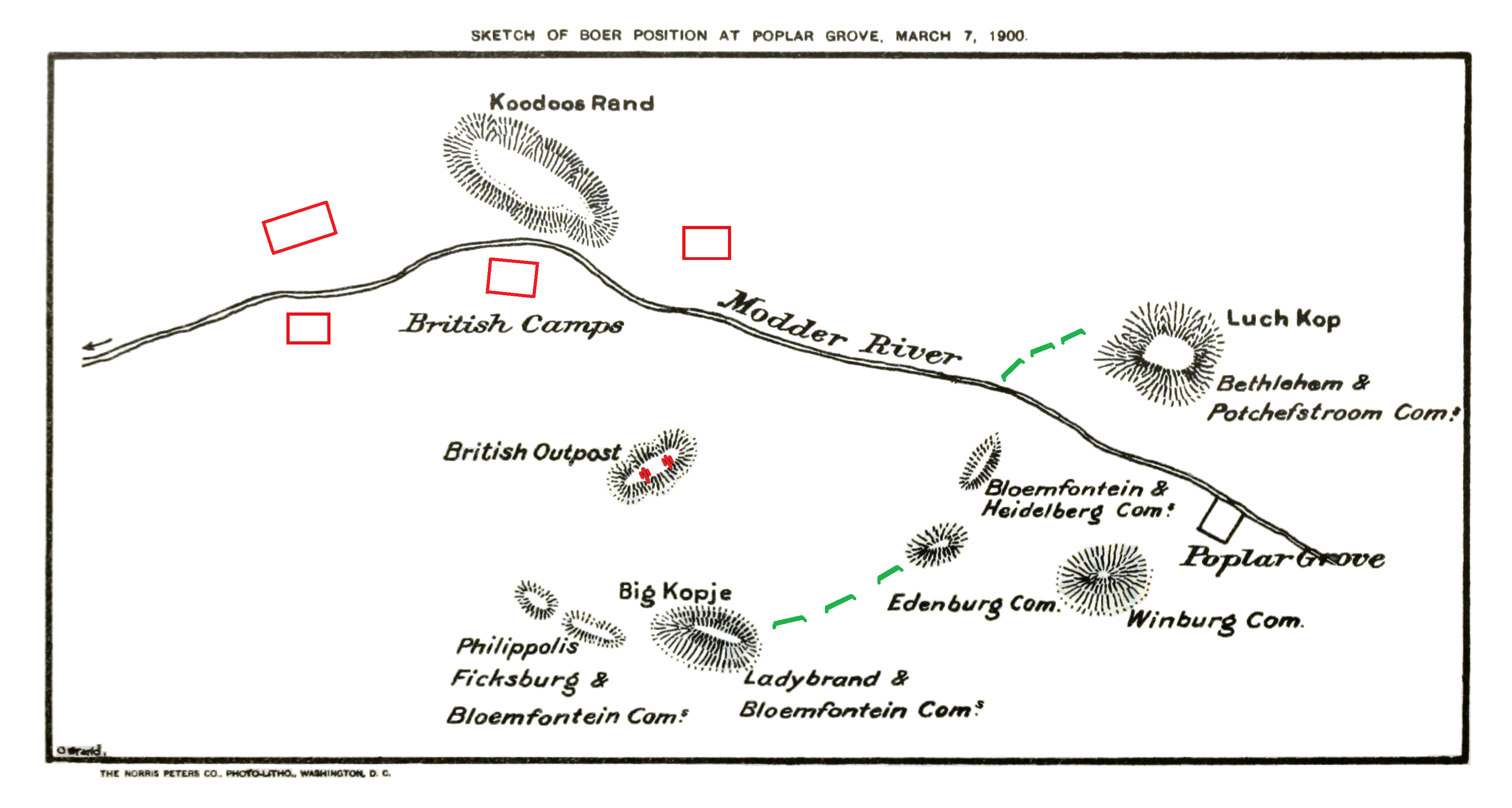
- Sketch of positions at Poplar Grove, March 7, 1900
Date	7 March 1900
Location	Poplar Grove, Orange Free State 28°54′32″S 25°21′57″E
Result	British victory

Belligerents
United Kingdom: Australia	South African Republic; Orange Free State

Commanders and leaders
(United Kingdom) Lord Roberts	(Orange Free State) Christiaan de Wet

Strength
5,000; 7 guns	5,000

Casualties and losses
8 killed 49 wounded	1 killed 1 wounded

The Battle of Poplar Grove (Afrikaans: Slag van Modderrivierpoort) was an incident on 7 March 1900 during the Second Boer War in South Africa. It followed on from the Relief of Kimberley as the British Army moved to take the Boer capital of Bloemfontein. The Boers were demoralised following the surrender of Piet Cronjé at the Battle of Paardeberg. General Sir John French's cavalry attacked the Boer force from the rear while mounted infantry and horse artillery attacked from the right flank. The Boers abandoned their positions in panic before the cavalry. The commander-in-chief of the Free State forces, Christiaan de Wet, in his book called the chapter on the subject "Wild Flight from Poplar Grove". This battle was followed by the Battle of Driefontein (Afrikaans: Slag van Driefontein, also called Battle of Abrahamskraal (Slag van Abrahamskraal)) on March 10, 1900.

== Background ==
The Relief of Kimberley took place on 15 February 1900. After the Battle of Paardeberg on the Modder River, the Boer commander, General Cronje, surrendered on 27 February. Christiaan de Wet was appointed as commander-in-chief of the Orange Free State. He gathered his commandos at Poplar Grove, about ten miles upstream of Paardeberg and on the way to Bloemfontein, the capital of the Orange Free State. De Wet hastily assembled his burghers in sangars which straddled the Modder River along a line of hillocks, about ten miles wide. On 7 March President Kruger of the Zuid-Afrikaansche Republiek arrived at Poplar Grove to visit his remaining burghers. No sooner had he arrived than it was reported that Lord Roberts had commenced his advance on Bloemfontein. Kruger was bundled back into his cart and sent on his way.

== Battle ==
French's plan was to make a wide sweep around the six thousand Boers' left flank, without making contact, and then attack them from the rear. The infantry and the artillery would then attack them from the right. French, the cavalry division, some mounted infantry units and the horse artillery with 42 guns, carried out their order. But the Boers "did not behave like well-bred pheasants". Sir Arthur Conan Doyle wrote of it: "The plan of action was based, however, upon one supposition which proved to be fallacious. It was that after having prepared so elaborate a position the enemy would stop at least a little time to defend it."

== Aftermath ==
A panic had seized the Boers. When they saw the cavalry at a distance, they all fled. De Wet and his officers tried in vain to stop them. They eventually stopped at Abraham's Kraal, some 18 miles from Poplar Grove. There they resisted the advance quite bravely the next day, but that night they fled to Bloemfontein. Again the commandos were placed in defensive positions, ready to prevent Roberts from taking the capital. That night De Wet visited all the commandos. "An excellent spirit prevailed among them", De Wet was to write later. When he reached the southern positions, it was a different matter. One of the commandos had simply abandoned their position.

When the fighting started the next day, the Boers once again abandoned their positions and fled northwards.
