= Christiaan de Wet =

Boer general (1854–1922)

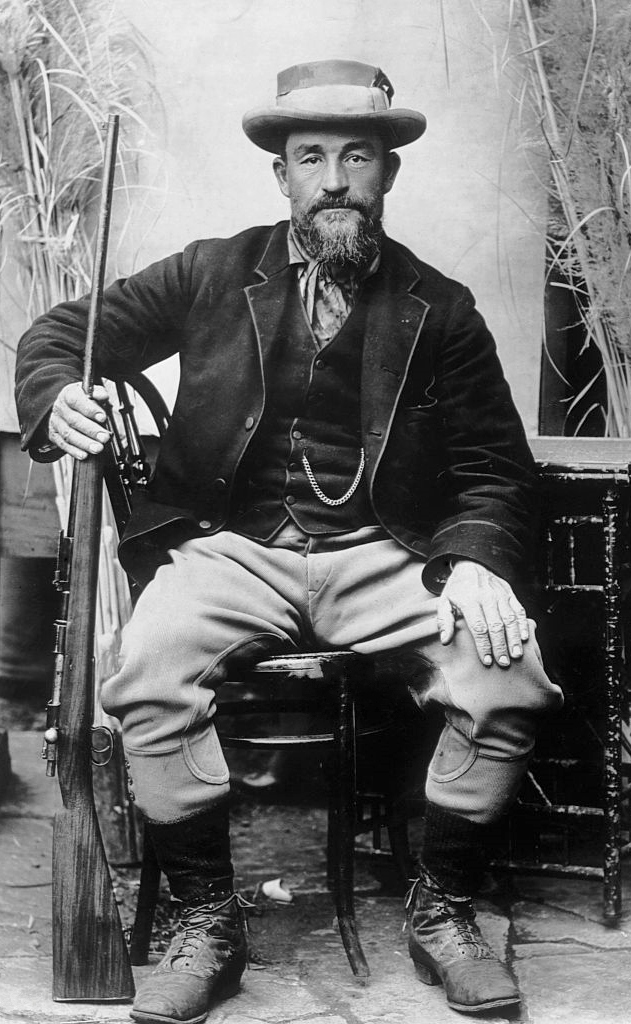
- De Wet in 1900

State President of the Orange Free State - Acting
- In office 29 May 1902 – 31 May 1902
- Preceded by: Martinus Theunis Steyn
- Succeeded by: Position abolished

Personal details
- Born: Christiaan Rudolf de Wet; 7 October 1854 Smithfield, Orange Free State
- Died: 3 February 1922 (aged 67) Dewetsdorp, Orange Free State Province, Union of South Africa
- Spouse: Cornelia Margaretha Krüger
- Children: 16
- Relatives: Carel de Wet (Grandson); Piet de Wet (Brother)
- Profession: Farmer, Boer general, Politician
- Nickname: The Fighting General

Military service
- Allegiance: South African Republic (1880–1881, 1914); Orange Free State (1899–1902)
- Years of service: 1880–1881, 1899–1902, 1914
- Rank: First Boer War: Commandant; Second Boer War: Burger (Outbreak); Acting commandant (October 1899); Veggeneraal (December 1899); Head General Boer Forces (February 1900)
- Commands: Natal and Transvaal Boer Commando
- Battles/wars: First Boer War: Battle of Majuba Hill; Battle of Laing's Nek; Second Boer War: Battle of Paardeberg; Battle of Poplar Grove; Battle of Driefontein; Sanna's Post; Battle of Reddersburg; Battle of Bothaville; Battle of Groenkop; Maritz Rebellion: Battle of Mushroom Valley

Christiaan Rudolf de Wet (7 October 1854 – 3 February 1922) was a Boer general, rebel leader and politician.

== Life ==
Born on the Leeuwkop farm, in the district of Smithfield in the Boer Republic of the Orange Free State, he later resided at Dewetsdorp, named after his father, Jacobus Ignatius de Wet. He married a woman named Cornelia Margaretha Krüger, and together they had 16 children. He also had a grandson that was born two years after his death named Carel de Wet.

== Military career ==
De Wet served in the First Boer War of 1880–81 as a field cornet, taking part in the Battle of Majuba Hill, in which the Boers achieved a victory over a British force under the command of Major-General Sir George Pomeroy Colley. This eventually led to the end of the war and the reinstatement of the independence of the Zuid-Afrikaansche Republiek, more commonly known as the Transvaal Republic.

In the years between the First and Second Boer Wars, from 1881 to 1896, he lived on his farm, becoming a member of the Volksraad in 1897.

=== Second Boer War ===
In September 1899, de Wet and his three sons were called up as ordinary private burghers without any rank. He was a member of the Heilbron kommando and they were ordered to proceed to the Natal frontier. On 11 October 1899, while he was reconnoitring the Natal frontier, De Wet was elected vice-commandant of Heilbron. He participated in the fight at Nicholson's Nek on 30 October, when a detachment of 954 British troops surrendered. Thereafter, he took part in the Siege of Ladysmith.

On 9 December 1899, De Wet received a telegram from the State President, M.T. Steyn, informing him that he had been appointed a fighting general and was to proceed to the Western frontier. He found General Piet Cronjé in command of the Boer forces ensconced at Magersfontein, south of Kimberley, while the British were at the Modder River. De Wet was to be Cronjé's second-in-command. The British advance commenced on 11 February 1900, with General French outflanking Cronjé at Magersfontein and riding towards Kimberley. De Wet's raid on the ox wagon convoy at Watervals Drift (Waterval Drift/Watervalsdrift), capturing 1600 oxen, did not stem the tide. The Siege of Kimberley was relieved on 15 February, and Cronjé surrendered with 4000 men at Paardeberg on 27 February. Shortly thereafter, de Wet was appointed Commander-in-Chief of the Free State forces. They could not contain the British advance towards the Free State capital, Bloemfontein, which was taken unopposed on 13 March 1900.

His next successful action was the surprise attack on Sanna's Post near Bloemfontein on 31 March 1900. That was followed on 4 April by the victory of Reddersburg. De Wet came to be regarded as the most formidable leader of the Boers in their guerrilla warfare. Sometimes almost captured by the British, sometimes escaping only by the narrowest of margins from the columns which attempted to surround him, and falling upon and capturing isolated British posts, De Wet continued his successful career to the end of the war, striking quickly where he could, and evading every attempt to bring him to bay. His brother, Piet Daniel De Wet, another successful Boer general, was captured by the British in July 1901 and subsequently served against Christiaan as a member of the National Scouts, who were Boers serving with the British forces. During the war, De Wet issued "general instructions to have all armed natives and native spies shot."

During the last phase of the war, Afrikaner people in Winburg taunted the local British garrison with a parody of Sir Walter Scott's Bonnie Dundee:

De Wet he is mounted, he rides up the street
The English skedaddle an A1 retreat!
And the commander swore: They've got through the net
That's been spread with such care for Christiaan De Wet.

There are hills beyond Winburg and Boers on each hill
Sufficient to thwart ten generals' skill
There are stout-hearted burghers 10,000 men set
On following the Mausers of Christian De Wet.

Then away to the hills, to the veld, to the rocks
Ere we own a usurper we'll crouch with the fox
And tremble false Jingoes amidst all your glee
Ye have not seen the last of my Mausers and me!

De Wet took an active part in the peace negotiations of 1902. On 30 May 1902, he briefly took on the role of acting State President of the Orange Free State, when President Steyn had to leave the negotiations due to illness. De Wet was one of the signatories of the Treaty of Vereeniging.

== Political career ==
At the conclusion of the war he visited Europe with other Boer generals. While in England the generals unsuccessfully sought a modification of the peace terms concluded in Pretoria. De Wet wrote an account of his campaigns, an English version of which appeared in November 1902 under the title De Stryd tusschen Boer en Brit (Three Years War). In November 1907, he was elected a member of the first parliament of the Orange River Colony and was appointed Minister of Agriculture. In 1908–09 he was a delegate to the Closer Union Convention.

De Wet was one of the leaders of the Maritz Rebellion which broke out in 1914. One of his sons was killed in the uprising. De Wet himself was defeated at Mushroom Valley by General Botha on 12 November 1914, taken prisoner by CMDT Jorrie Jordaan (the commanding officer was Colonel Brits) on 1 December on a farm called Waterbury in the Northwest province near Tosca. The general remarked: "Thank God it is not an Englishman who captured me after all." He was sentenced to a term of six years imprisonment, with a fine of £2000 (R790,000 in 2018). He was released after one year's imprisonment, after giving a written promise to take no further part in politics. The rebellion also earned the nickname The Five Shillings Rebellion after De Wet remarked: "I was charged before [the Magistrate of Reitz] for beating a native boy. I only did it with a small shepherd's whip, and for that I was fined 5 [shillings]." (Note: General De Wet publicly unfurled the rebel banner in October, when he entered the town of Reitz at the head of an armed commando. He summoned all the town and demanded that the court shorthand writer take down every word he said, among which he complained: "I was charged before [the Magistrate of Reitz] for beating a native boy. I only did it with a small shepherd's whip, and for that I was fined 5/–". On hearing the contents of the speech, General Smuts christened the rising as "the Five Shilling Rebellion". Other sources place the incident in the town of Vrede on 28 October 1914.)

De Wet progressively weakened and at length, on 3 February 1922, he died on his farm. General Smuts, who had become Prime Minister, cabled his widow: "A prince and a great man has fallen today." De Wet was given a state funeral in Bloemfontein and buried next to President Steyn and Emily Hobhouse at the foot of the memorial to the Boers who died in Second Boer War concentration camps. On the 100th anniversary of his birth, a bronze equestrian statue, by Coert Steynberg, was unveiled at the Raadzaal in Bloemfontein.

== Legacy ==
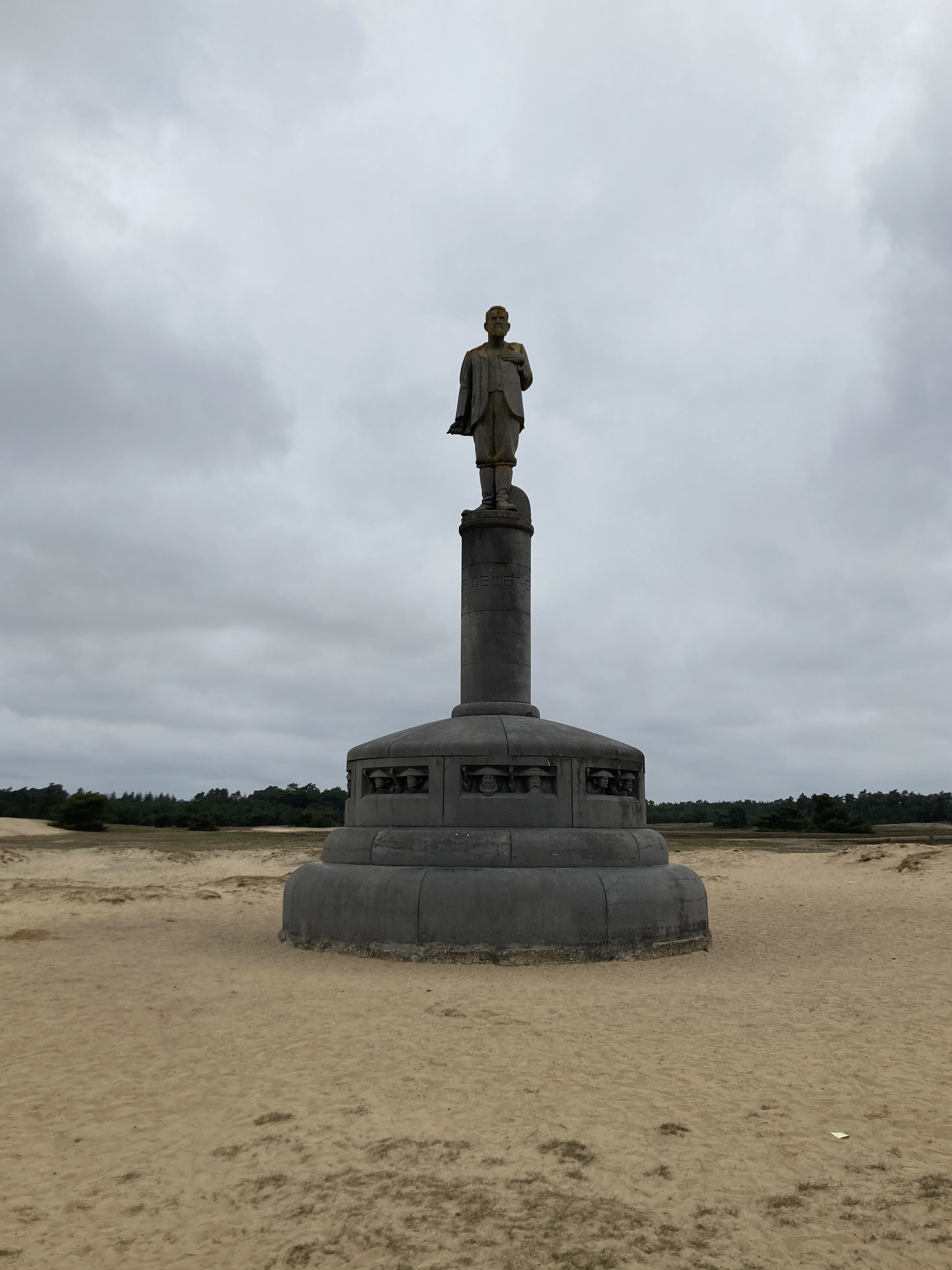
Christiaan de Wet monument, Hoge Veluwe, the Netherlands

De Wet distinguished himself in the Second Boer War and earned a reputation for bravery in the many battles that he fought in that conflict. In the early 1920s, Irish republican leader Michael Collins was called "the Irish de Wet" by the British press.

== In popular culture ==
- De Wet was a personal friend of Helene Kröller-Müller (1869–1939), who commissioned a statue of him in the Hoge Veluwe National Park in the Netherlands.
- Rudyard Kipling's 1903 poem Ubique mentions de Wet.
- General De Wet referenced in George Desmond Hodnett's 1958 Irish folk song Take Her Up to Monto:

"You've seen the Dublin Fusiliers,
The dirty old bamboozeleers,
De Wet'll kill them chiselers, one, two, three.
Marching from the Linen Hall
There's one for every cannonball,
And Vicky's going to send them all, o'er the sea.
But first go up to Monto, Monto, Monto
March them up to Monto, lan-ge-roo,
To you!"
