= Republic of Zoutpansberg =

Former Boer Republic in Southern Africa

The Republic of Zoutpansberg Het Republiek Van Zoutpansberg (Dutch)
- Flag

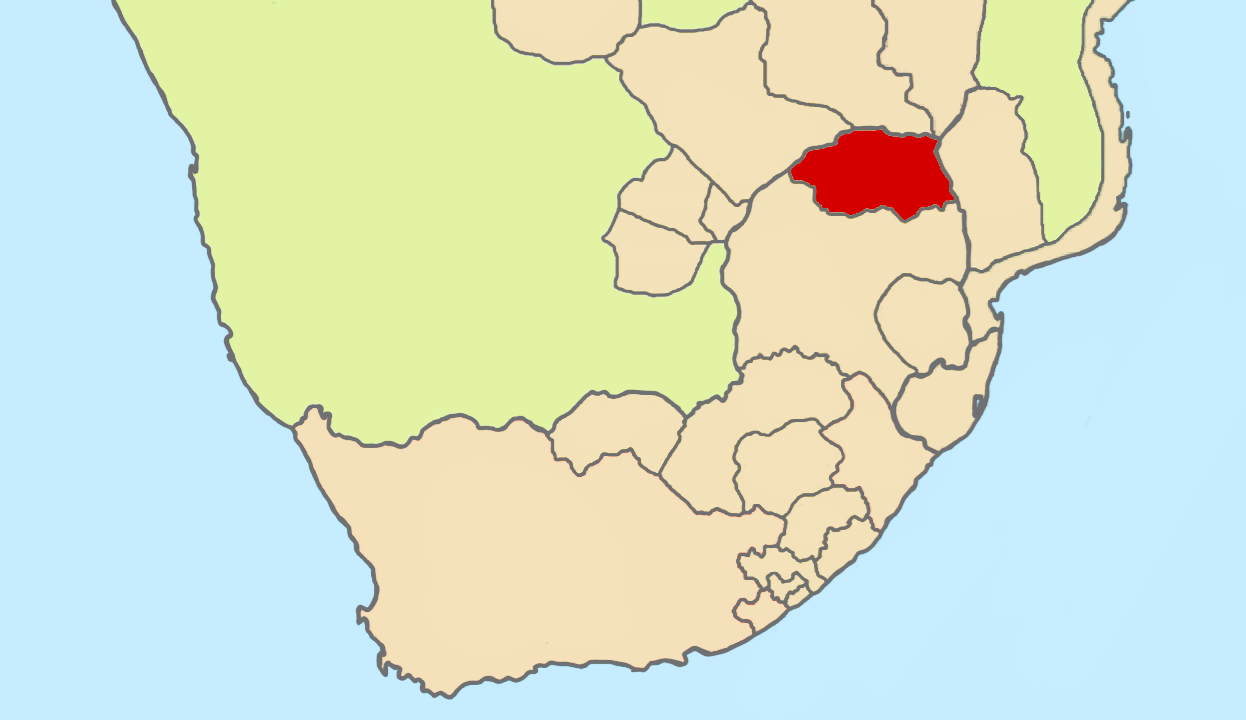
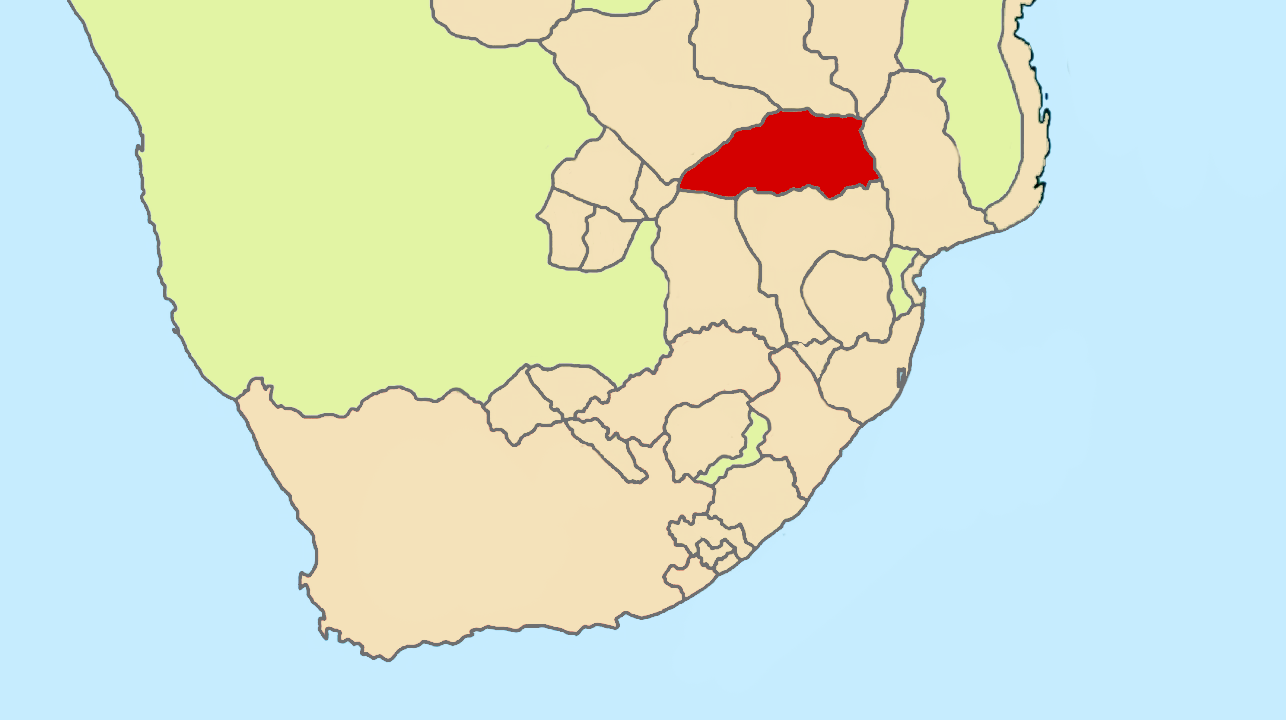
- Demonym: Zoutpansberger
- Government: Boer Republic
  - Head of State: Pieter Johannes Potgieter; Hendrik Potgieter
  - Commandant-general: Stephanus Schoeman
  - Provincial Commandant: Willem Cornelis Janse van Rensburg
- History
  - Established: 1849
Preceded by	Succeeded by
Pedi people; Venda	South African Republic
- Today part of: South Africa

The Republic of Zoutpansberg was a Boer Republic in Northern South Africa from 1849 to 1864, when it incorporated into the South African Republic due to the Transvaal Civil War.

== History ==
Zoutpansberg was the district to which Louis Tregardt and Hans van Rensburg, the forerunners of the Great Trek, journeyed in 1835. In 1845 Hendrik Potgieter, a prominent leader of the Trek Boers, removed thither and settled his followers at Oude Dorp. The Zoutpansberg Boers formed a semi-independent community, and in 1857 Stephanus Schoeman, their commandant-general, sided against Marthinus Pretorius and Paul Kruger when they invaded the Orange Free State. It was not until 1864 that Zoutpansberg was definitely incorporated in the South African Republic. Tregardt and his companions had been shown gold workings by the natives, and it was in this district in 1867–70, and in the neighbouring region of Lydenburg, that gold mines were first worked by Europeans south of the Limpopo River. The white settlers in Zoutpansberg had for many years a reputation for lawlessness, and were later regarded as typical "back veldt Boers." Zoutpansberg contains a larger native population than any other region of the Transvaal. It is highly mineralized, next to gold, copper, found near the Limpopo (where the Messina mine is) being the chief metal worked. The district long suffered from lack of railway communications, but in 1910 the completion of the Selati line giving it direct access to Delagoa Bay was begun. The chief towns were Pietersburg and Leydsdorp.
