= Boer republics =

Former countries in southern Africa

Boer republics and Griqua states in Southern Africa, 19th century

The Boer republics (sometimes also referred to as Boer states) were independent, self-governing republics formed (especially in the last half of the 19th century) by Dutch-speaking inhabitants of the Cape Colony and their descendants. The founders – variously named Trekboers, Boers, and Voortrekkers – settled mainly in the middle, northern, north-eastern and eastern parts of present-day South Africa. Two of the Boer republics achieved international recognition and complete independence: the South African Republic (Dutch: Zuid-Afrikaansche Republiek, ZAR; or Transvaal) and the Orange Free State. The republics did not provide for the separation of church and state, initially allowing only the Dutch Reformed Church, and later also other Protestant churches in the Calvinist (specifically Afrikaner) tradition. The republics came to an end after the Second Boer War of 1899–1902, which resulted in British annexation and later (in 1910) incorporation of their lands into the Union of South Africa.

== Background ==
Flag used by the Voortrekkers during the Great Trek

The Dutch East India Company (VOC) first issued land to the Free Burghers in 1657. The Free Burghers established two colonies at the Liesbeeck River near Rondebosch in the Western Cape. Following an application process, the Free Burghers formed two groups, the first group named their settlement Harman's Colony and the second group named theirs Stephen's Colony. By 1670, the VOC decided to grant additional land to the Free Burghers in order to increase grain production for the purpose of sustainability since grain had to be imported. The Free Burgher settlements gradually expanded towards the interior of South Africa.

The United Kingdom took over from the Netherlands as the colonial power at the Cape of Good Hope in 1806, replacing the Dutch Cape Colony with its own colony of the same name. Subsequently, a number of its Dutch-speaking inhabitants trekked (moved) inland, first in smaller numbers, then in groups as large as almost a hundred people, after 1834 in groups of hundreds. There were many reasons why the Boers left the Cape Colony; among the initial reasons were the language laws. The British had proclaimed the English language as the only language of the Cape Colony and prohibited the use of the Dutch language. As the Bible, churches, schools and culture of many of the settlers were Dutch, this caused a lot of friction. Britain abolished slavery in 1834 and allocated the sum of 1,200,000 British pounds as recompense for the Dutch settlers' slaves. The Dutch settlers disputed the requirement that they had to lodge their claims in Britain and objected that the value of the slaves was many times the allocated amount. This caused further dissatisfaction among the Dutch settlers.

Boer migrants were referred to as the Voortrekkers during this time. Several mass movements occurred during the 1830s–1840 period. On 22 January 1837 Piet Retief addressed a letter to the British Colonial Administration in which he concluded "We quit this colony under the full assurance that the English Government has nothing more to require of us, and will allow us to govern ourselves without its interference in future".

== Republic of Swellendam ==
Flag of the Republic of Swellendam, also the flag of the Netherlands.

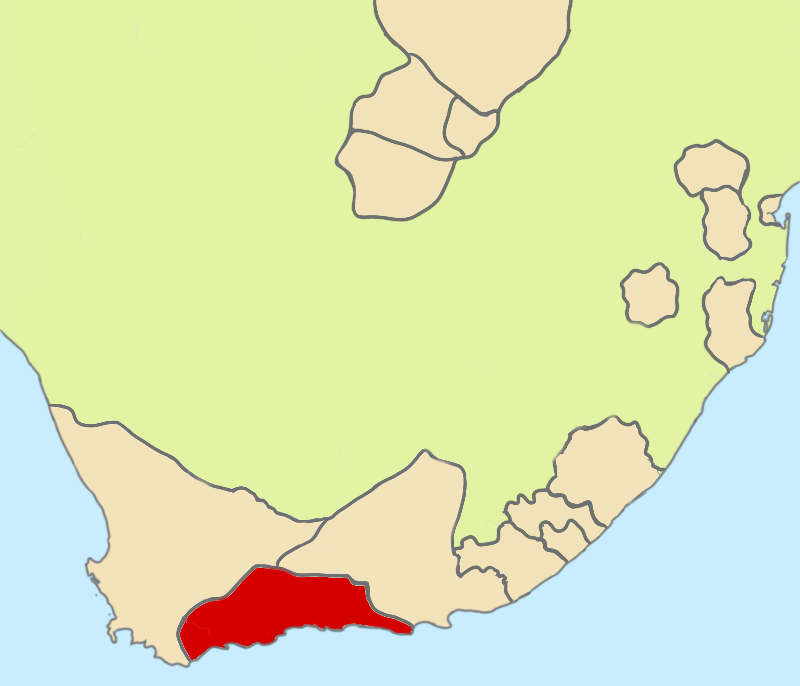
Swellendam in 1795 shown in red.

By 1795 the dissatisfaction towards the Dutch East India Company caused the burghers of Swellendam to revolt, and on 17 June 1795 they declared themselves a Republic. Hermanus Steyn was appointed as President of the Republic of Swellendam. The burghers of Swellendam started to call themselves "national burghers" – after the style of the French Revolution. However, the Republic was short-lived and was ended on 4 November 1795 when the Cape was occupied by the Kingdom of Great Britain.

== Republic of the Graaff-Reinet ==
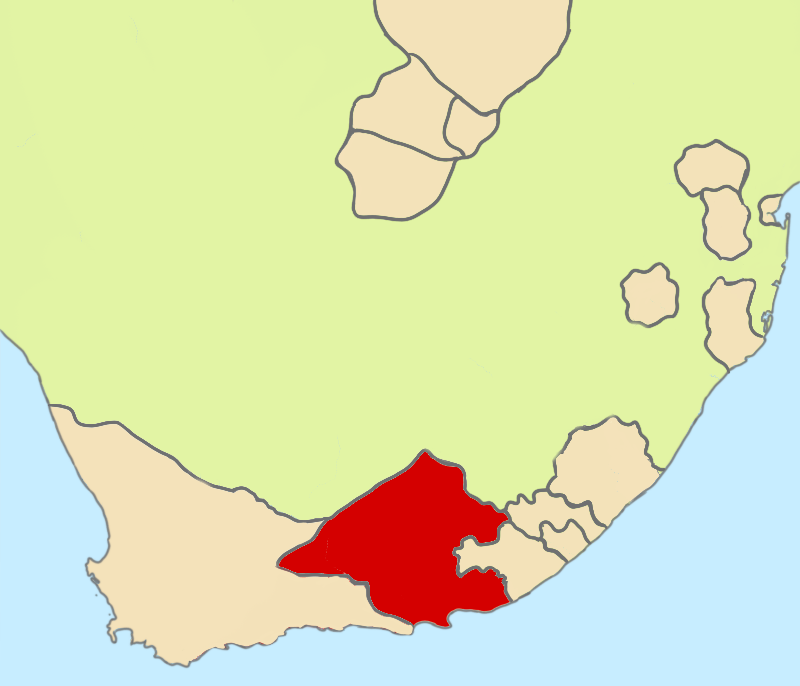
The Republic of Graaff-Reinet in 1796 shown in red.

Public farmers and the government authorities could not agree on policies with regards to the frontier resulting in the 'Cape Frontier Rebellion' of 1795 where after the Boers declared Graaff-Reinet an independent republic, called the Republic of Graaff-Reinet. Following the Invasion of the Cape Colony in 1795, the British took possession of the area which led to another revolt in 1799, the uprising were suppressed by British troops that same year.

== South African Republic ==
The ZAR in 1890.

The South African Republic, also known as the Transvaal and often abbreviated to ZAR, was a landlocked independent existed from 1852 to 1902, when it was annexed into the British Empire as a result of the Second Boer War. Its nucleus was a group of Voortrekkers that split in 1835 with the group leaving going to Zoutpansberg, and the group led by Hendrik Potgieter remaining at the Vet river and founded the town of Winburg and who after beating a Matabele raiding party declared the lands north and south of the Vaal river as Boer lands. After being defeated in the 1848 Battle of Boomplaats the Volksraad was transferred from Winburg to Potchefstroom and the South African Republic was established as the name of the new country. The Republic's independence north of the Vaal River was recognised by Britain in the 1852 Sand River Convention.

Relations with Britain started to deteriorate after the British Cape Colony expanded into the Southern African interior, and for a short time Transvaal was annexed but this ended after the First Boer War. The Boer victory confirmed the ZAR's independence; however, Anglo-ZAR tensions soon flared up again over various diplomatic issues. In 1899, war again broke out with Britain and the Transvaal was swiftly occupied by British forces. Many Bittereinders refused to surrender, leading British commander Lord Kitchener to order the adoption of several scorched-earth policies and concentration camps. In the treaty which ended the war, the ZAR was transformed into the Transvaal Colony, and in 1910 became part of the Union of South Africa. During World War I, there was a failed attempt at resurrecting the republic in the Maritz rebellion.

== Zoutpansberg ==
Flag of the Zoutpansberg Republic

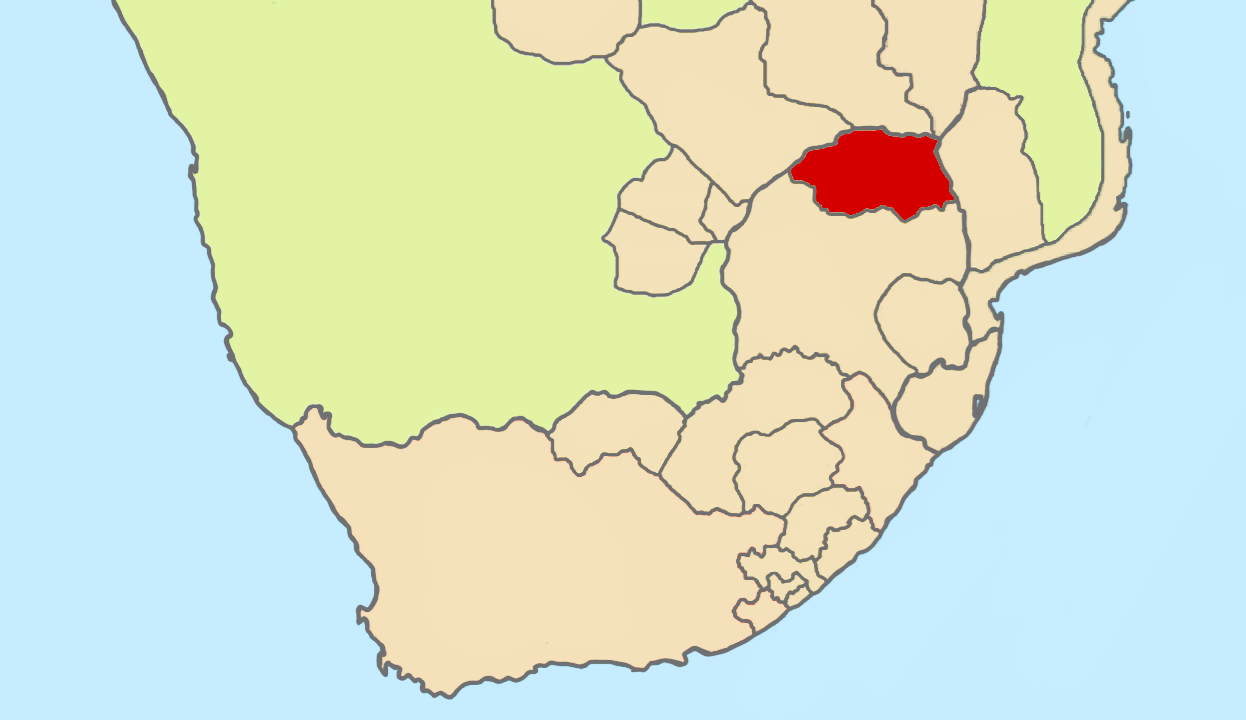
The Republic of Zoutpansberg in the 1860s shown in red.

Louis Tregardt and Jan van Rensburg split off from Hendrik Potgieter's group, and continued on to establish Zoutpansberg. along the Limpopo River.

They learnt goldworking from the natives. The white settlers in Zoutpansberg had a reputation of lawlessness, often being called typical "Back-veldt Boers". In 1864, they were inevitably incorporated into the South African Republic (Transvaal) after the Transvaal Civil War. As a district in the Republic, they had the largest native population in the South African Republic.

== Natalia Republic ==
Flag of the Natalia Republic

In April 1837, a party under leadership of Piet Retief arrived in Thabanchu. In June 1837, in Winburg, the newly elected Boer Volksraad appointed Piet Retief as Commandant-General. An argument between Maritz and Potgieter, both elected to the Volksraad, led to a split. Maritz and Piet Retief decided to secede from the Potgieter- and Uys-led Boer country. The Boers under the leadership of Piet Retief obtained a treaty from Zulu King Dingane to settle part of the lands the Zulus administered or held sway over, but Dingane later betrayed the treaty and slaughtered Retief and 70 members of his delegation. Dingane's impis (Zulu warriors) then killed almost 300 Boers who had settled in the Natal region.

After Pretorius was recruited to fill the leadership vacuum created by the deaths of Piet Retief and Maritz, he offered to negotiate for peace with Dingane if he were to restore the land he had offered to Retief. Dingane responded by attacking the Voortrekkers; on 16 December 1838 the battle of Ncome River (later named the Battle of Blood River) occurred, during which 300 Voortrekkers survived and won a decisive battle against thousands of Dingane's impis.

The Natalia Republic was established in 1839 by the local Boers after Pretorius entered into an alliance with Mpande, the new Zulu king.

== Klip River Republic ==
In 1847, after buying land around Ladysmith from the Zulu king Mpande, a number of Boers settled in the area and called it the Republic of Klip River (Afrikaans: Klip Rivier Republiek) with Andries Spies as their commandant. The British considered a violation of their treaty with the Zulu Kingdom. Mpande had to reoccupy the land with his own troops. The land was annexed by the British in the same year and on 20 June 1850 was proclaimed a township called Windsor, later to be renamed as Ladysmith.

== Utrecht Republic ==
After the British annexed the newly formed Klip River Republic in 1843 most of the inhabitants moved to the lands that would later become the Transvaal and Orange Free State. But three of them – A. T. Spies, J. C. Klopper and C. J. van Rooyen – owned land east of the Buffalo River for 300 cattle in 1852 from Zulu King Mpande. Van Rooyen, who spoke the Zulu language fluently, was a friend of King Mpande kaSenzangakhona and, had assisted him a few years earlier. Before 1852, Van Rooyen had permission to use this tract of land for grazing.

The majority of northern Natal was intermittently uninhabited, since King Shaka had driven out the resident Hlubi people; the Zulu people inhabited the land generally. In the Transvaal Archive, the settlers who moved there with the trio were called the Buffel rivier maatschappij (Buffalo River Society).

In a proclamation dated 27 December 1852 the Zuid-Afrikaansche Republic (ZAR), in a letter signed by Commander-General A. W. J. Pretorius (the hero of the Battle of Blood River), warned them that the ZAR did not recognize the transaction. This was due to a fear of antagonizing the English, who would be their neighbors on the Buffalo River after the annexation of the Klip River Republic. This warning was re-issued in December 1853, in a letter written to "Phillip Koch and the rest of the inhabitants of the area of the Buffalo River". These inhabitants wished to be incorporated into the ZAR, but the ZAR refused. On 8 September 1854 the trio of settlers again traded the same land for a further 100 cattle and had a bill of sale signed; it may be viewed in the Transvaal Archive. The following is a translation from the original Dutch:

Dumasoela 8 September 1854

Under the authority vested in me as Panda, King of the Zulus, I herewith declare that I have traded one portion of my land to the undersigned emigrants in exchange for one hundred head of cattle, which cattle I have received on this date and have given the land noted below as the everlasting property of the emigrants.

XXXXXX (the mark signifies the name Panda)

The border will be where the Blood River flows into the Buffel River en along Blood River and further along the small stream (Lynspruit) and along the mountains all open lands that are not inhabited by Panda kaffirs up to the round hill between the two small streams at Pongola and along the border of the Free Republic and all enclosed lands up to the British border.

As witnesses J. C. Klopper P. W. Jordaan C. J. van Rooyen J. G. Herbst A. T. Spies Aldus signed and notarized on this date

xxxxxx (the mark signifies the name Mapasha)

Permission to graze the land under traditional Zulu land use system did not equate to ownership as understood in Western terms.

The flag of the Netherlands served as the flag of the short lived Utrecht Republic

The Republic of Utrecht (after the formation of the New Republic on its eastern side, which had been known as the Old Republic) existed until 1858, when it joined the Republic of Lydenburg. This republic joined the ZAR in 1860. Utrecht and Vryheid (the capital of the former New Republic) remained part of the ZAR until 31 May 1902, when the ZAR surrendered to Great Britain. After this, both towns (and their districts) were incorporated into the Colony of Natal as spoils of war.

== Orange Free State ==
Flag of the Orange Free State

In June 1852 a public meeting was held in Bloemfontein where all the European people voted on a resolution whether to pursue independence or remain under British rule. The vast majority of people voted to remain under British rule. Sir Harry Smith, however, had instructions to hand the country over to the Boers. In 1853, Sir George Clerk was sent as special commissioner to give up the land and to establish self-rule. 16,000 people sent a delegation of representatives to inform Clerk that the people wished to remain governed by Britain. Clerk however had clear instructions to establish self-rule, and with a minority Boers represented by J.H. Hofmann, agreed to a convention of independence.

== Goosen (Goshen) ==
Flag of the Republic of Goshen

The State of Goosen was founded by a group of Boer mercenaries led by Nicolaas Claudius Gey van Pittius in November 1882. It unified with Stellaland on 6 August 1883.

== Stellaland ==
Flag of the United States of Stellaland

West of the Transvaal 400 Boers allied with David Massouw, leader of the Koranna Khoisan tribe, when they invaded and took a piece of land, which they declared the Republic of Stellaland. The first president was Gerrit Jacobus van Niekerk and the town of Vryburg was founded and declared its capital. In 1883, The Republic of Stellaland united with The State of Goshen to form the United States of Stellaland.

== New Republic ==
Flag of Nieuwe Republiek

The New Republic (comprising the town of Vryheid) was established in 1884 on land given to the local Boers by the Zulu King Dinuzulu, the son of Cetshwayo, after he recruited local Boers to fight on his side. The Boers were promised and granted land for their services and were led by Louis Botha who would go on to prominence during the second Anglo-Boer War. This republic was later absorbed into the Transvaal/South African Republic.

== Little Free State ==
Flag of Little Free State

Officially founded in 1886 by Boers living on south-western Swati land (modern Mpumalanga) leased from the Swati King since the mid-to-late 1870s. The land of the Little Free State, having largely been granted to local hunters Joachim Ferreira and Franz Maritz by King Dlamini IV in 1877, would become an official presidential republic in 1886, only ceasing to exist after its annexation the South African Republic (Transvaal) in 1891.

== Griqualand ==
Flag of Griqualand

States were also established by other population groups, most notably the Griqua, a subgroup of South Africa's heterogeneous and multiracial Coloured people. Most notable among these were Griqualand West and Griqualand East.

== International recognition ==
The people north of the Vaal River in the South African Republic were recognised as an independent country by the United Kingdom with the signing of the Sand River Convention on 17 January 1852.

The Orange Free State was recognised by the UK on 17 February 1854. The Orange Free State became independent on 23 February 1854 with the signing of the Bloemfontein or Orange River Convention. The Orange Free State was nicknamed "the model republic".

The Transvaal and the Orange Free State developed into successful independent countries which were recognized by the Netherlands, France, Germany, Belgium, the United States, and Britain. These two countries continued to exist for several decades, despite the First Boer War with Britain. However, later developments, including the discovery of diamonds and gold in these states, led to the Second Boer War. In this war, the Transvaal and Orange Free State were defeated and annexed by the overwhelmingly larger British forces, ceasing to exist on 31 May 1902, with the signing of the Treaty of Vereeniging. A new British dominion, the Union of South Africa, was established under the South Africa Act 1909, in which the Transvaal and the Orange Free State became provinces along with the Cape and Natal.

== 2014 land claim ==
On 24 April 2014, political party Front Nasionaal (FN) submitted a land claim to the Land Claims Commissioner in Pretoria on behalf of the Afrikaner nation. The claim pertains to the land described in National Archives of South Africa R117/1846: "From Ohrigstad to the north till the Olifantsrivier, then downwards to the Delagoa Bay line; to the south till the Crocodile River; to the west to Elandspruit till the 26 degrees line; east till where the Crocodile River joins the Komati River." FN states that the sale of said land was between King Masous (representative of the Zulu) as seller; and Commandant SJZR Burg (representative of the Dutch South African nation) as buyer. A copy of the agreement is filed in the Government Archives under file R117/46. FN further states that the land was legally bought and paid for on 25 July 1846 as an ethnic group and not as individual landowners and was only in custodianship of the pre-1994 government as they were regarded as descendants of the ethnic group. There was therefore no legal right to hand this land over to a "foreign" government in April 1994 and away from the original ethnic group. The new land claims process has not yet been finalised however.

== 2026 land claim ==
On 2 February 2026, a White separatist group, Boervolk of the Orange Free State, filed a formal claim in a government gazette seeking land in KwaZulu-Natal, citing historical transactions with Zulu rulers and invoking the United Nations Resolution 1514.

== List of states and republics ==
=== Boer republics ===
- Freeburgher Colonies (1656–1795)
- Republic of Swellendam (1795)
- Republic of Graaff-Reinet (1795–1796)
- Republic of Zoutpansberg (1835–1864)
- Winburg (1836–1844)
- Potchefstroom (1837–1844)
- Natalia Republic (1839–1843)
- Winburg-Potchefstroom (1844–1848)
- Republic of Klip River (1847–1848)
- Republic of Lydenburg (1849–1860)
- Utrecht Republic (1852–1858)
- South African Republic (1852–1877, 1881–1902)
- Orange Free State (1854–1902)
- Klein Vrystaat (1886–1891)
- State of Goshen (1882–1883)
- Republic of Stellaland (1882–1883)
- United States of Stellaland (1883–1885)
- New Republic (1884–1888)
- Republic of Upingtonia/Lijdensrust (1885–1887)

=== Griqua states ===
- Griqualand East (1862–1879)
- Griqualand West (1870–1871)
- Philippolis/Adam Kok's Land (1826–1861)
- Waterboer's Land (1813–1871)

== See also ==
- Boer
- Burgher (Boer republics)
- Trekboers
- Afrikaner nationalism
- Afrikaner Calvinism
- History of South Africa
