= Pieter Johannes Potgieter =

Commandant-General Pieter Johannes Potgieter
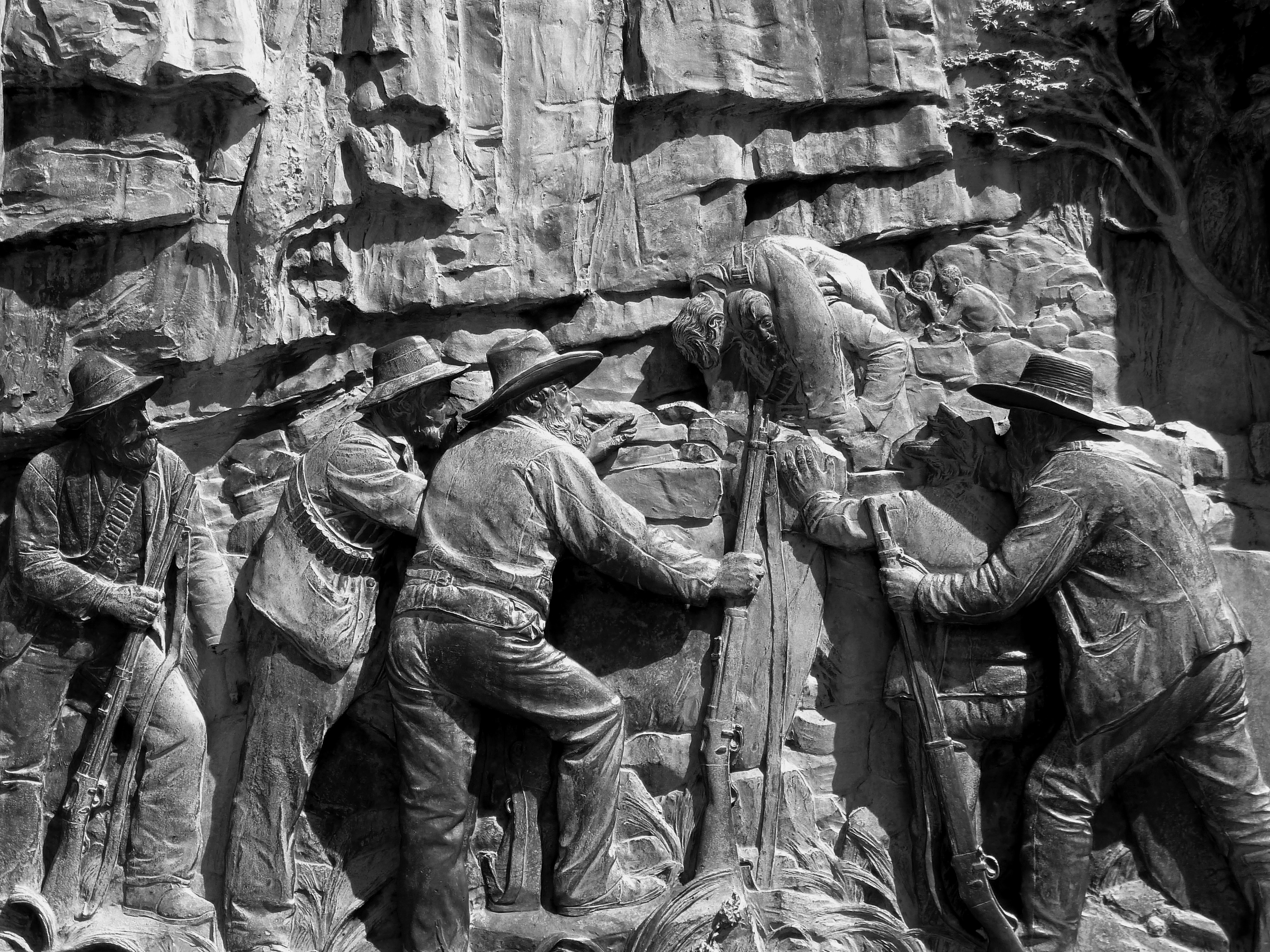
- Piet Potgieter, leader of Zoutpansberg, dies at Makapansgat when hit by a sniper bullet, and his body is retrieved by Paul Kruger

Acting Head of State of Zoutpansberg Republic
- In office 1852–1854
- Preceded by: Hendrik Potgieter
- Succeeded by: Stephanus Schoeman

Personal details
- Born: 24 December 1822 Graaff-Reinet, Cape Colony
- Died: 6 November 1854 (aged 31) Potgietersrus, Republic of Zoutpansberg
- Spouse: Poppie Van Heerden (±1845–1854)
- Relations: Hermanus Steyn
- Children: 5
- Parent(s): Hendrik Potgieter; Elisabeth Helena Botha
- Occupation: Boer General

Military service
- Battles/wars: Battle of Makapansgat

Pieter Johannes "Piet" Potgieter (1822 – 1854) was a South African Boer political figure. He was the acting head of state of Zoutpansberg from 1852 to 1854, and the first son of voortrekker Andries Potgieter.

He married Elsie Maria Aletta van Heerden, who later married Stephanus Schoeman, a subsequent leader of The Republic of Zoutpansberg, and acting president of the South African Republic. The town Piet Potgietersrust, now Mokopane, was named in Potgieter's memory in 1907.

== Leader of Zoutpansberg ==
When Andries Hendrik Potgieter died in 1852, he left his son, cmdt.genl. Piet Potgieter, in charge of the Zoutpansbergdorp. Potgieter had a short tenure, as he soon died in a campaign against tribal leader Mgombane ka Gegana.

In September 1854 Piet's uncle, field cornet Hermanus Potgieter (Groot Hermaans), was searching for ivory near the Nyl River, an area ruled by chiefs Makapan and Mankopane (also: Mapela or Mapele). For reasons imperfectly known, the chiefs decided to massacre them and other unrelated white travellers. The act claimed the lives of 28 white settlers, and the Potchefstroom governance authorized a punitive commando under the command of Piet Potgieter and M. W. Pretorius. The tribesmen retreated into Makapansgat cave, where they were to suffer heavy casualties. One of their snipers however managed to fatally shoot Piet Potgieter. Potgieter was the only Boer casualty of the campaign, but his death brought an end to his family's hegemony in the north.

== Descendants ==
The family was the starting point of an influential South-Africa lineage. The Potgieters' daughter Elsie Maria Aletta married reverend Ds. J H M Stofberg, the secretary and head of the NG Church in South-Africa, after ex president Schoeman granted his blessing. They had two children of which one became a political figure through the South-African Broederbond and a member of the executive committee of the National Party, Dr. Pieter Johannes Potgieter Stofberg. National Party Minister Hendrik Schoeman was also closely related to this family.
