= S. P. E. Trichard =

S.P.E. Trichard
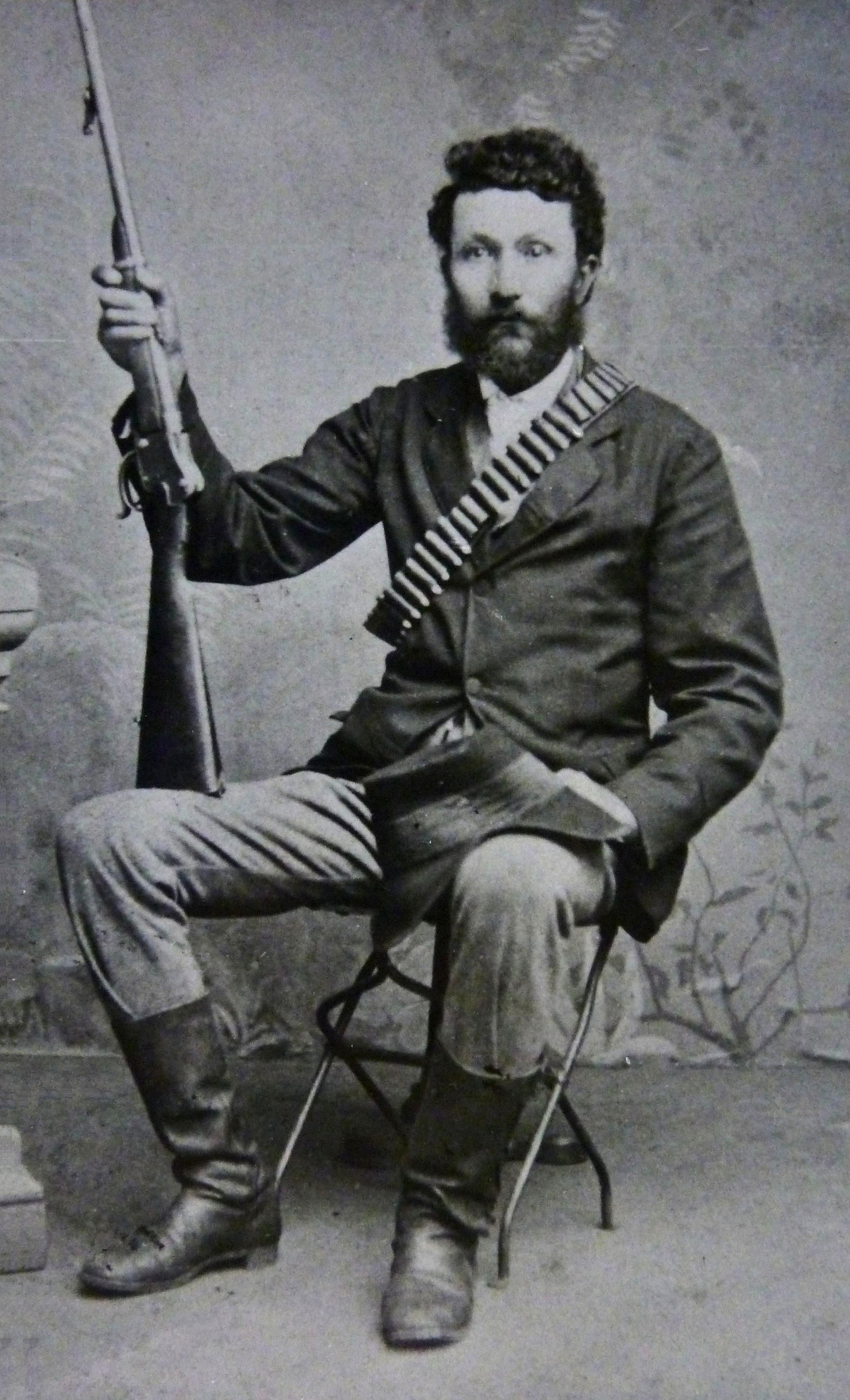
- Kommandant (Afrikaans for Commander) SPE Trichard, Commissioner for natives' affairs of Middelburg, Transvaal
- Born: 23 January 1847; Ohrigstad
- Died: October 1907 (aged 60); Kenya
- Occupation: Boer soldier

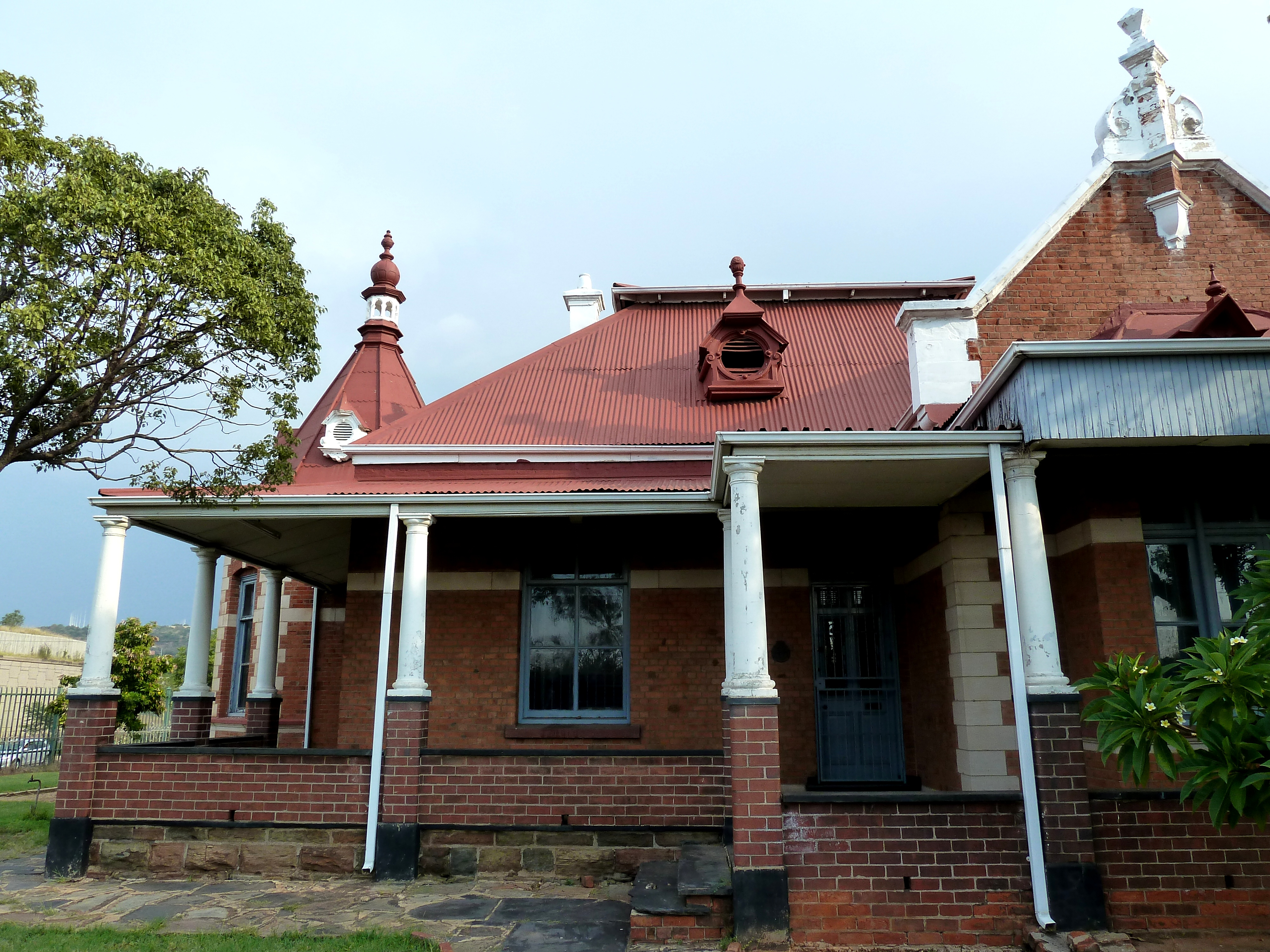
Official residence of Trichardt as Head of the State Artillery at the appropriate address of 1 Artilleriery, Salvokop, Pretoria.

Stephanus Petrus Erasmus Trichard (23 January 1847, Ohrigstad - October 1907, Kenya) was a field cornet and Commander for the South African Republic (Zuid-Afrikaansche Republiek, ZAR) in the First and Second Boer War.

He fought in most campaigns against African peoples near the South African Republic. In the First Boer War (1880 – 1881) he joined the storming of Amajuba (Battle of Majuba Hill, 27 February 1881). Later he repulsed the Jameson Raid (29 December 1895 – 2 January 1896). After his military service as Head State Artillery and Commander in the Second Boer War (1899 – 1902), he emigrated with a Boer group to East Africa, where he died in 1907.

== ZAR citizen and officer ==
He was a son of Voortrekker Carolus Johannes Tregardt (af, also Karel Tregardt or Trichard, 3 September 1811, Graaff-Reinet, Eastern Cape - 25 April 1901, Middelburg, Transvaal), and the grandson of Voortrekker Louis Tregardt (10 August 1783, Oudtshoorn – 25 October 1838, Lourenco Marques). As a young man, he participated in the ZAR's campaigns against Mapoch (1882 – 1883), the Swazi people and Sekhukhune. During the people's assembly at Paardekraal on 13 December 1880, he was elected field cornet (Afrikaans: veldkornet) for Middelburg and the neighbourhood of Olifants River, and shortly afterwards fought in the Battle of Bronkhorstspruit (20 December 1880) and the Battle of Majuba Hill (27 February 1881). Initially, he was commander for Middelburg, and played an active role during military expeditions against Mapoch (1882–1883), Rain Queen Modjadji (Lobedu War, 1890), Malaboch (April - July 1894), and Chief Makgoba (1894–1895).

== Head of Transvaal State Artillery ==
Shortly after, Trichard and the Middelburg Commando made an important contribution to the repulsion of Jameson and his fellow invaders (Jameson Raid, 29 December 1895 – 2 January 1896). He was promoted in 1897 to commander of the ZAR Transvaalse Staatsartillerie (State Artillery Regiment). The post was vacant after the death of Lieutenant-Colonel Henning P. N. Pretorius (1844–1897), and Trichard's appointment was not undisputed among the officers of the State Artillery. Also in 1897 the State Artillery undertook the Swaziland expedition, and in 1898 action was taken in the ZAR-Venda War against Makhado (Magato, ZAR - Venda or Mphephu War). The State Artillery was already regarded as a close elite corps, thanks to his predecessor, but under Trichard it was modernized and expanded.

== Second Boer War ==
Lieutenant-Colonel Trichard and General Piet Joubert were opposed to the building of forts around Pretoria, and in the run-up to the Second Boer War Trichard advocated a more lenient policy towards the United Kingdom. During the Second Boer War, he fought on the Natal front, where he was involved at Dundee and Ladysmith. Then he fell back with the Boers to the Orange Free State and fought in the Battle of Brandfort (25 March 1900) and later on in the Battle of Donkerhoek (Diamond Hill, 11 – 12 June 1900) in the ZAR.

At the Battle of Dalmanutha (Bergendal, 21 – 27 August 1900), he successfully demonstrated the State Artillery's capabilities, but it would also ring their unit's death bell. The cannons' usefulness had come to an end in the coming guerilla war phase and they had to be systematically destroyed. The corps was divided into different units, and in October 1900 the Transvaal Uitvoerende Raad (Executive Board) had to declare Trichard's post redundant. However, retaining his rank, he led a division of the Middelburg commando until the end of the war in 1902.

As a previously wealthy farmer from the Middelburg district, Colonel Trichard submitted a claim for damages after the Treaty of Vereeniging on 31 May 1902. However, he threw the £300 offered to him at the officer's feet. He recorded his experience during the Second Boer War he recorded in a memoir.

== Land seeker ==
Colonel Trichard's son Charles (C.J.) now considered the possibility of emigration to Madagascar, an area which had been explored years before by his grandfather Carolus. The Trichards were among a group of "bittereinders" (diehards) who attended a planning meeting in Ermelo on January 7, 1903. The six men who formed part of a delegation there for a Landseeking expedition to German East Africa, had excluded the Trichards for the time being. Colonel Trichard however did join the dozen of the Great Commission under the leadership of Piet C. Joubert, who departed from Lourenco Marques in May 1904. At Trichard's insistence, they visited Madagascar, which was also examined as a destination by the Reitz brothers and General Manie Maritz. They visited Tamatave (Toamasina) and Tananariwe (Antananarivo), and were received by Governor General Joseph Gallieni, who authorised them to undertake a fact-finding journey. After exploring the east coast, they however decided against settling because of three reasons, namely the official status of the Catholic Church, endemic malaria and the strong oriental influences.

From Madagascar, they travelled to Dar es Salaam, where they renewed the negotiations of 1903. They received permission to view the environment of Mount Meru, and returned soon after to the Transvaal, where their plans were completed in July 1904. In 1905, Trichard and his son Charles departed together with the Piet Joubert-trek to German East Africa. He eventually settled at Nakuru in Kenya, but died there during a hunting trip in October 1907.

== Literature ==
See references.

- Breytenbach, J. H. (1969–1996). Die Geskiedenis van die Tweede Vryheidsoorlog in Suid-Afrika, 1899–1902 [The History of the Second War of Independence in South Africa, 1899–1902] (in Afrikaans). Pretoria: Die Staatsdrukker.
  - Breytenbach, J. H. (1969). Die Boere-offensief, Okt. – Nov. 1899 [The Boer Offensive, Oct. – Nov. 1899]. Die Geskiedenis van die Tweede Vryheidsoorlog in Suid-Afrika, 1899–1902 (in Afrikaans). Vol. I. Pretoria: Die Staatsdrukker. OCLC 798106662. Pages 85–88, 167, 169-171, 182, 187-191, 194-195, 197, 230-231, 261, 266, 270-273, 276-278, 284-286, 300-302, 305, 316-317, 328, 352, and 360.
  - Breytenbach, J. H. (1971). Die eerste Britse offensief, Nov. – Des. 1899 [The first British offensive, Nov. – Dec. 1899]. Die Geskiedenis van die Tweede Vryheidsoorlog in Suid-Afrika, 1899–1902 (in Afrikaans). Vol. II. Pretoria: Die Staatsdrukker. Pages 240, 421, 428-429, 435, 442, 444, 449-451.
  - Breytenbach, J. H. (1973). Die stryd in Natal, Jan. – Feb. 1900 [The battle in Natal, Jan. – Feb. 1900]. Die Geskiedenis van die Tweede Vryheidsoorlog in Suid-Afrika, 1899–1902 (in Afrikaans). Vol. III. Pretoria: Die Staatsdrukker. ISBN 9780797012394. OCLC 612581136. Pages 11–12, 21, 91, 110, 263, 265, 267, 356, 427, 544, 554, and 557.
  - Breytenbach, J. H. (1996). Die beleg van Mafeking tot met die Slag van Bergendal [The siege of Mafeking up to the Battle of Bergendal]. Die Geskiedenis van die Tweede Vryheidsoorlog in Suid-Afrika, 1899–1902 (in Afrikaans). Vol. VI. Pretoria: Die Staatsdrukker. ISBN 9780797033214. OCLC 813492747. Pages 163, 165, 176, and 183.
