= Transvaal Civil War =

South African civil war

Date	1862–1864 (2 years)
Location	South African Republic (Transvaal)
Result	Armistice

Belligerents
South African Republic	Rebels; Republic of Zoutpansberg

Commanders and leaders
Paul Kruger; Willem van Rensburg; Theunis Snyman	Stephanus Schoeman; Jan Viljoen; Johannes Steyn

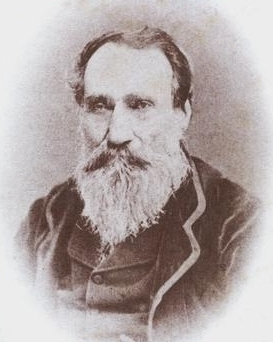
Stephanus Schoeman, a fierce opponent of Kruger during the 1860s

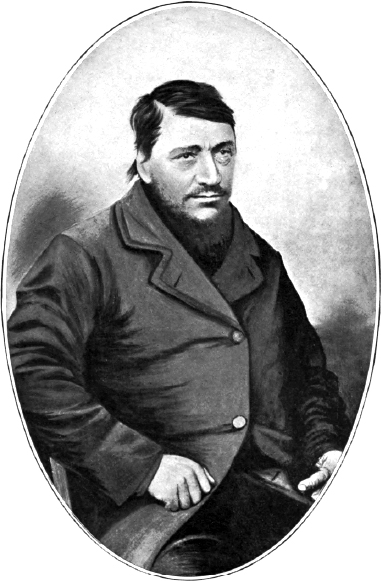
Kruger, photographed as Commandant-General of the South African Republic, c. 1865. The loss of his left thumb is clearly visible.

The Transvaal Civil War was a series of skirmishes during the early 1860s in the South African Republic, or Transvaal, in the area now comprising the Gauteng, Limpopo, Mpumalanga, and North West provinces of South Africa. It began after the British government had recognised trekkers living in the Transvaal as independent in 1854. The Boers divided into numerous political factions. The war ended in 1864, when an armistice treaty was signed under a karee tree south of the site of the later town of Brits.

== Background ==
In late 1859, the president of Transvaal, Marthinus Wessel Pretorius, was invited to stand for President in the Orange Free State, where many burghers now favoured union, partly as a means to overcome the Basotho. The Transvaal constitution that he had just enacted made it illegal to hold office abroad, but he readily did so and won. The Volksraad attempted to side-step the constitutional problems by granting Pretorius half-a-year of leave in the hope that a solution might come about, and the president duly left for Bloemfontein and appointed Johannes Hermanus Grobler to be acting president in his absence. Pretorius was sworn in as President of the Free State on 8 February 1860 and sent a deputation to Pretoria to negotiate union the next day.

Commandant-General Paul Kruger and others in the Transvaal government disliked Pretorius's unconstitutional dual presidency and worried that Britain might declare the Sand River and Orange River Conventions void if the republics joined. Pretorius was told by the Volksraad on 10 September 1860 to choose between his two posts. To the surprise of his supporters and detractors, he resigned as President of the Transvaal and continued in the Free State. After Stephanus Schoeman unsuccessfully attempted to use force to supplant Grobler as acting president, Kruger persuaded him to submit to a volksraad hearing, where Schoeman was censured and relieved of his post. Willem Cornelis Janse van Rensburg was appointed acting president while a new election was organised for October 1862. Having returned home, Kruger was surprised to receive a message urgently requesting his presence in the capital, the volksraad having recommended him as a suitable candidate. He replied that he was pleased to be summoned but his membership in the Dopper Church meant that he could not enter politics. Van Rensburg promptly had legislation passed to give equal political rights to members of all Reformed denominations.

== War ==
Schoeman mustered a commando at Potchefstroom but was routed by Kruger on the night of 9 October 1862. After Schoeman returned with a larger force Kruger and Pretorius held negotiations and agreed to hold a special court on the disturbances in January 1863 and soon thereafter fresh elections for president and commandant-general. Schoeman was found guilty of rebellion against the state and banished. In May the election results were announced, with Van Rensburg becoming president and Kruger as commandant-general. Both expressed disappointment at the low turnout and resolved to hold another set of elections. Van Rensburg's opponent was now Pretorius, who had resigned his office in the Orange Free State and returned to the Transvaal. Turnout was higher, and on 12 October, the volksraad announced another Van Rensburg victory. Kruger was returned as commandant-general with a large majority. The civil war ended with Kruger's victory over Jan Viljoen's commando, raised in support of Pretorius and Schoeman, at the Crocodile River on 5 January 1864. Elections were held yet again, and this time Pretorius defeated Van Rensburg. Kruger was re-elected as commandant-general with over two thirds of the vote.

The civil war led to an economic collapse in the Transvaal, weakening the government's ability to back up its professed authority and sovereignty over the local chiefdoms, though Lydenburg and Utrecht now accepted the central administration. By 1865 tensions had risen with the Zulus to the east and war had broken out again between the Orange Free State and the Basotho. Pretorius and Kruger led a commando of about 1,000 men south to help the Free State. The Basotho were defeated and Moshoeshoe ceded some of his territory, but President Johannes Brand of the Free State decided not to give any of the conquered land to the Transvaal burghers. The Transvaal men were scandalised and returned home en masse, despite Kruger's attempts to maintain discipline. The following February, after a meeting of the Volksraad in Potchefstroom, Kruger capsized his cart during the journey home and broke his left leg. On one leg, he righted the cart and continued the rest of the way. The injury incapacitated him for the next nine months, and his left leg was thereafter slightly shorter than his right.

In 1867, Pretoria sent Kruger to restore law and order in Zoutpansberg. He had around 500 men but very low reserves of ammunition, and discipline in the ranks was poor. On reaching Schoemansdal, which was under threat by the chief, Katlakter, Kruger and his officers resolved that holding the town was impossible and ordered a general evacuation, and Katlakter razed the town. The loss of Schoemansdal, once a prosperous settlement by Boer standards, was considered a great humiliation by many burghers. The Transvaal government formally exonerated Kruger over the matter by ruling that he had been forced to evacuate Schoemansdal by factors beyond his control, but some still argued that he had given the town up too readily. Peace returned to Zoutpansberg in 1869 after the intervention of the republic's Swazi allies.

== Aftermath ==
Pretorius stepped down as President in November 1871. In the 1872 election Kruger's preferred candidate, William Robinson, was decisively defeated by Thomas François Burgers, a church minister from the Cape who was noted for his eloquent preaching but controversial because of his liberal interpretation of the scriptures; for example, he did not believe in the Devil. (Note: The Doppers despised Burgers, denouncing him as "Godless"; some even called him the Antichrist.) Kruger publicly accepted Burgers's election and announced at his inauguration that "as a good republican", he submitted to the vote of the majority but had grave personal reservations regarding the new president. He particularly disliked Burgers's new education law, which restricted children's religious instruction to outside school hours, which was in Kruger's view an affront to God. That, coupled with the sickness of Gezina and their children with malaria, caused Kruger to lose interest in his office. In May 1873, he requested an honourable discharge from his post, which Burgers promptly granted. The office of commandant-general was abolished the following week.

Kruger moved his main residence to Boekenhoutfontein, near Rustenburg, and for a time absented himself from public affairs. (Note: Kruger had owned Boekenhoutfontein since 1860. He retained Waterkloof as well, would own both properties for the rest of his life and would acquire and sell many others.)

== See also ==
- First Boer War, 1880–81
- Second Boer War, 1899–1902

== Sources ==
- Davenport, T R H (2004). "Kruger, Stephanus Johannes Paulus [Paul] (1825–1904)". Oxford Dictionary of National Biography (online ed.). Oxford: Oxford University Press. doi:10.1093/ref:odnb/41290. (Subscription, Wikipedia Library access or UK public library membership required.)
- Meintjes, Johannes (1974). President Paul Kruger: A Biography. London: Cassell. ISBN 978-0-304-29423-7.
