= Piet Huet =

Dutch minister, poet, and writer

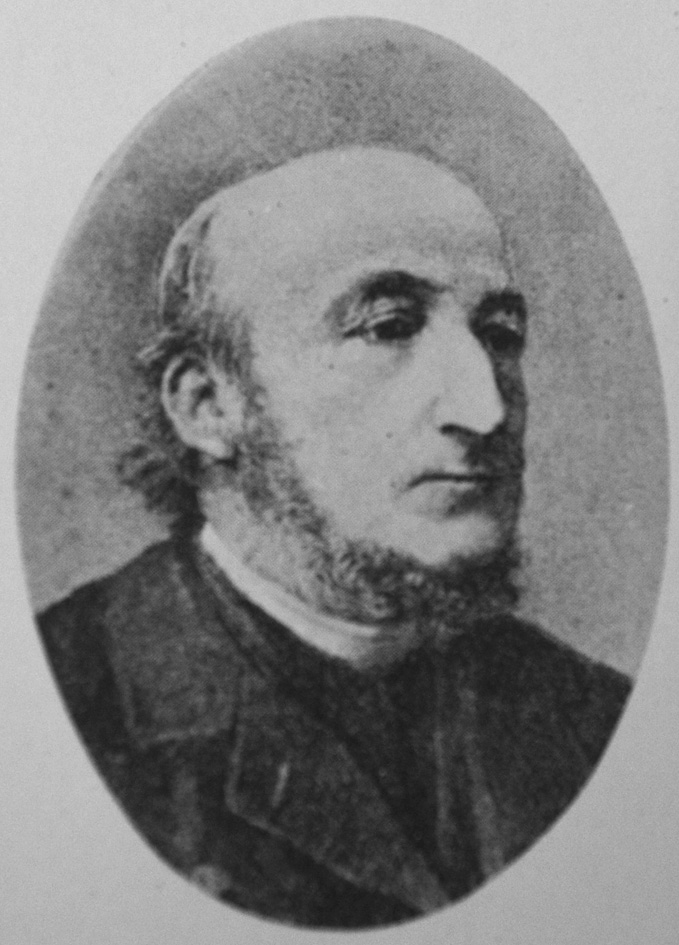
- Born: Damnes Pierre Marie Huet; 7 December 1827; Amsterdam, Netherlands
- Died: April 9, 1895 (aged 67); Goes, Netherlands
- Occupations: Writer and minister
- Writing career
- Language: Dutch

Damnes Pierre Marie "Piet" Huet (7 December 1827 – 9 April 1895) was a Dutch minister who settled in southern Africa in the nineteenth century and published several collections of poetry and prose works. Some of his notable works include: Het lijden dezer wereld, Niet om the twisten, maar uit gewetensdran, Afrikaansche gedichten etc.

== Life and work ==
Dammes Pierre Marie Huet was born on 7 December 1827 in Amsterdam, the Netherlands, the son of an Amsterdam minister at the Walloon church, Pierre Josué Louis Huet. He first studied at the Athenaeum in Amsterdam and from 20 October 1847 in Utrecht. During his student days in Leiden and in Montauban, he lived a dissolute life and was guilty of all kinds of extravagance, for which he was once imprisoned in France for up to three weeks.

He took his candidate's examination in 1853. In 1853, the Paarl minister, Rev. G.W.A. van der Lingen, sent a request to Holland for an editor who would edit a magazine for South Africa under his supervision. He wanted to publish his own Christian magazine under the title Elpis, for which he wanted a competent literary scholar on the editorial staff. Huet accepted the invitation and left for the Cape in October 1853, where he lived in the Paarl rectory after his arrival in February 1854. To prepare himself for his task as editor, he studied the journalism of the Cape press and especially of De Zuid-Afrikaan. Already at this time he published his first collection of poems, Paarlsche Gedichtjens.

He was converted again by his patron and his head was then set on the missionary field, rather than becoming an editor. Rev. Van der Lingen advised him to apply to the Synodal commission to be admitted to the proponents' examination. This commission did not sit until 1857 and he accepted a call to be an assistant preacher in the Aliwal North Reformed Church.

On his travels through Aliwal North and the Free State he effected many conversions among the black people, such that he was moved by this and by their fate. In October 1857 he returned to Cape Town to give his trial sermon before the Synod, for which he chose as text "Roept Simson, dat hij voor ons spele". The same day he was admitted to the pastorate in the NG Church by vote and he made himself available as a pastor for the NG congregation in Lydenburg. In order to enable him to take up his office, the synod decided to proceed immediately to his ordination, which took place in a ceremony held in the Groote Kerk in Cape Town on 2 November 1857. At this synod it was also decided to approve separate church services for white and coloured members, due to objections from white ranks to joint services.

Early in the following year he undertook a journey as a delegate of the Cape Synod to the Eastern Transvaal and first travelled through Natal. His two-month stay in Pietermaritzburg gave rise to the verses that were included in his religious poetry collection Uit Natal. He campaigned for the equality of whites and blacks and this made the congregations restless, so that in Utrecht he heard the rumour that the people of Lydenburg would rather not receive him. He nevertheless worked for a while with blessing in Lydenburg. From Lydenburg he went further north to the Zoutpansberg, where a congregation called him. In the meantime he was also called to the Dutch Reformed congregation of Ladysmith in Natal and here he was confirmed on 28 November 1858.

In the same issue of Kerkbode (that of 1 January 1859) in which the announcement of his confirmation was published, there also appeared an announcement that the Executive Council of the South African Republic had rejected the appeal by the Church Council of Zoutpansberg and that Rev. Dirk van der Hoff had called the church council to account for their failure to obtain his prior permission for the appeal. At Ladysmith Huet caused a stir by insisting, contrary to the decision of the Synod, that all races should have a place in the church.

His intentions in 1860 to seek help in Holland for the vast congregations were closely connected with his missionary zeal. He left for Cape Town, where the first issue of the liberal monthly De Onderzoeker, edited by L. Marquard, had just appeared. Huet threw his weight behind orthodoxy and issued a pamphlet warning against the “false deceitful workers, people who slander what they do not know”. In 1860 he accepted a call to the NG congregation in Pietermaritzburg instead of undertaking his intended European journey. In Pietermaritzburg he married Meinonda Robbé, a Dutchman by birth, in 1861.

He became intensely involved in the church disagreement between orthodoxy and liberalism and wrote the Herderlijke Brief of 1863, which took up no less than ten columns in De Kerkbode. In all sorts of brochures such as Mededeelingen van den strijd in Frankrijk tusschen Modernen en Orthodoxen and Verderfelijke ketterijen bekedtelijk inwoerd, he took to the field against liberalism. In the meantime, he continued to campaign for the upliftment of black people. He also played a major role in promoting the commemoration of Vow Day, as he felt that such a vow to God could not be taken lightly and that God would be glorified thereby.

At the General Church Assembly of the Natal Dutch Reformed Churches on 20 October 1864, he proposed that 16 December should henceforth be celebrated as a day of thanksgiving in all Natal congregations, and the proposal was adopted. In 1867, he accepted the invitation to represent Natal at the Evangelical Alliance in Amsterdam. Although he initially intended to return, he now remained in the Netherlands for good and never returned to South Africa. From 1867 to 1869, he was a traveling minister of the Confessional Association. Here, he published two pamphlets with “communications” about South Africa, consisting of experiences, newspaper articles and other information. In 1868, Eenvoude medeedeelingen over Zuid-Afrika was published and in 1869, the sensational Het lot der zwarten in Transvaal: medeedeelingen omtren de slavernij en wreedheden in de Zuid-Afrikaansche Republiek. His purpose in this last writing was to denounce the impunity with which black people were treated in the Transvaal. It was also written to exert pressure from outside, in the hope that the English government might be persuaded to put an end to the lawlessness by taking over the Transvaal.

He again served as a minister in the Netherlands, serving the congregation in Veenendaal from 1870 and the congregation at Dirksland from 1871. From 1875 he was involved in the Brighton Movement, which pursued Christian revival, and was a pastor at the Reformed Church of Nunspeet, but he left this congregation in 1878. During his stay in Nunspeet he wrote the brochure Niet om te twisten, maar uit gewetensdwang, in which he attacked the Reformed doctrine of predestination. From 1878 he served at the congregation in Goes.

Already during his time in South Africa he wrote in his diaries and travel reports how abundant psychic mediums were among Afrikaans people from the Soutpansberg to Pietermaritzburg. Susanna Smit, wife of the Voortrekker minister Erasmus Smit, particularly impressed him with her visions. From about 1885 he was openly deeply involved with so-called Christian spiritualism, which alienated him from the mainstream churches. He caused scandals, among other things, when he summoned the spirits of the dead such as John Calvin, G.W.A. van der Lingen and Tsjaka van die Zulues and wrote theological articles with their help. In 1890, however, he broke with spiritualism and returned to the Reformed Church. He died on 9 April 1895 in Goes.

== Bibliography ==
- Antonissen, Rob. Die Afrikaanse letterkunde van aanvang tot hede. Nasou Beperk. Derde hersiene uitgawe. Tweede druk, 1964.
- Conradie, Elizabeth. Hollandse skrywers in Suid-Afrika (Deel I) (1652–1875) J.H. de Bussy. Pretoria, 1934.
- Dekker, G. Afrikaanse Literatuurgeskiedenis. Nasou Beperk. Kaapstad. Elfde druk, 1970.
- Kannemeyer, J.C. Geskiedenis van die Afrikaanse literatuur 1. Academica. Pretoria en Kaapstad. Tweede druk, 1984.
- Kannemeyer, J.C. Die Afrikaanse literatuur 1652–2004. Human & Rousseau. Kaapstad en Pretoria. Eerste uitgawe, 2005.
- Nienaber, P.J. Hier is ons skrywers! Afrikaanse Pers-Boekhandel. Johannesburg. Eerste uitgawe, 1949.
- Schoeman, Karel. Merksteen: ’n Dubbelbiografie. Human & Rousseau. Kaapstad., Pretoria en Johannesburg. Eerste uitgawe, 1998.
- Van Coller, H.P. (red.) Perspektief en Profiel Deel 3. Van Schaik-Uitgewers. Pretoria. Eerste uitgawe, 2006.
- De Villiers, Johannes Bertus. Wat klop so? Dominee hoor dit dan ook…By, 19 Maart 2011.
