= Republic of Lydenburg =

Former Boer Republic in Southern Africa

The Republic of Lydenburg De Republiek Lydenburg (Dutch)
- Flag
- Capital: Lydenburg
- Official languages: Dutch
- Recognised regional languages: Afrikaans and various Bantu languages
- Religion: Dutch Reformed
- Demonym: Lydenburger
- Government: Boer Republic
  - President: Hendrik Potgieter
- History
  - Established: 1856
  - Disestablished: 1860
Preceded by	Succeeded by
Swazi people	South African Republic
- Today part of: South Africa

The Republic of Lydenburg was founded in 1856 by the Voortrekkers under the leadership of Hendrik Potgieter. Lydenburg was declared the capital of the country in 1856. It later merged with the Republic of Utrecht. This union joined the South African Republic in 1860.

== History ==
The Republic of Lydenburg was founded after a group of Boers had separated from the Potchefstroom Republic in 1856. The village of Lydenburg was founded in 1849 by a group of Voortrekkers led by Hendrik Potgieter after they had left their previous settlement near Ohrigstad in the North due to a malaria epidemic. The republic later, in 1857, joined the republic of Utrecht. In 1860 both merged republics rejoined the South African Republic
