= Zoutpansberg =

Region of the South African Republic

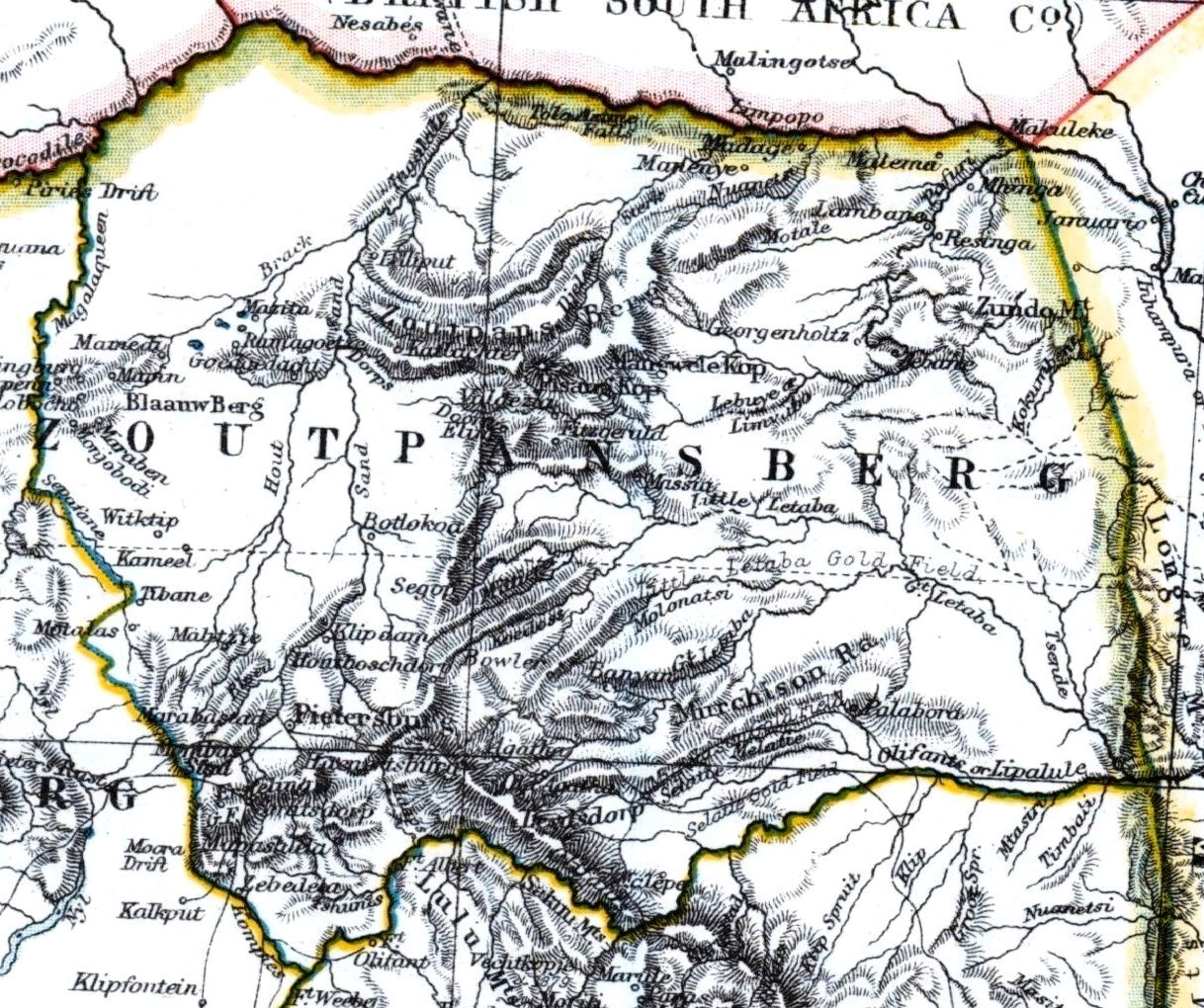
Zoutpansberg on a map of 1897

Zoutpansberg was the north-eastern division of the Transvaal, South Africa, encompassing an area of 25,654 square miles. The chief towns at the time were Pietersburg and Leydsdorp. It was divided into two districts (west and east) prior to the first general election of the Union of South Africa in 1910. Since 2005 the area is divided into the Capricorn, Vhembe and Mopani district municipalities of Limpopo province.

== Voortrekkers ==
This was the district to which Louis Tregardt and Hans van Rensburg, the forerunners of the Great Trek, journeyed in 1835. In 1845 Hendrik Potgieter, a prominent leader of the Voortrekkers, moved there. The Zoutpansberg Boers formed a semi-independent community, and in 1857 Stephanus Schoeman, their commandant-general, sided against Marthinus Pretorius and Paul Kruger when they invaded the Orange Free State.

== South African Republic ==
It was not until 1864 that Zoutpansberg was definitively incorporated in the South African Republic as a result of the Transvaal Civil War. The white settlers in Zoutpansberg had for many years a reputation for lawlessness, and were later regarded as typical "back velt Boers".

== Native population ==
Zoutpansberg contained a larger native population than any other region of the Transvaal. It was estimated at 201,539 in 1903.

== Minerals ==
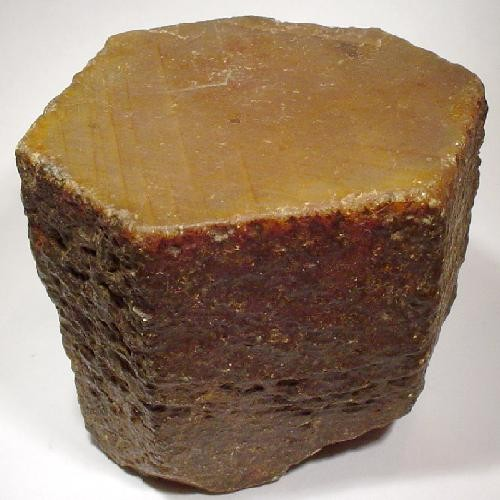
A large, sharp, hexagonal, doubly terminated, rust-brown corundum crystal (5.2 x 4.5 x 4.1 cm) from United Jack Mine, Zoutpansberg

Tregardt and his companions had been shown gold workings by the natives, and it was in this district in 1867–70, and in the neighbouring region of Lydenburg, that gold mines were first worked by Europeans south of the Limpopo. It is a highly mineralized area; next to gold, copper, found near the Limpopo River (where the Messina mine is located) is also extracted here.

== See also ==
- Dzata ruins
- Kingdom of Mapungubwe
- Schoemansdal, Limpopo, abandoned Voortrekker town
