= Mokopane Biodiversity Conservation Centre =

South African research institute

Coordinates: 24°10′16″S 29°01′06″E

The Mokopane Biodiversity Conservation Centre was established in 1979 and opened to the public in October 1981, as a satellite of the National Zoological Garden (NZG), Pretoria Zoo. In 2004 the NZG was proclaimed as a National Facility, as part of the National Research Foundation of South Africa (NRF). In April 2018 the Mokopane BCC was transferred to the National Department of Environment, Fisheries and Forestry as campus of the South African National Biodiversity Institute (SANBI).

The centre is located on the northern entrance road (R101) into the town, Mokopane, in the Limpopo province of South Africa and covers an area of 1300 ha. The centre is a combination of different conservation environments consisting of a small zoo, breeding camps, and a nature reserve (a free ranging area), accommodating a large variety of plant and animal species.

The centre is part of the World Heritage Site, The Fossil Humid Sites of South Africa, Makapan's Valley, proclaimed by UNESCO in 2005, and proclaimed as a Specially Protected Area in accordance with South African legislation in December 2007.

Mokopane BCC is commonly referred to by the local community as the Game Breeding Centre which was its historical name from 1979 until 2007 when the name was changed to Mokopane Biodiversity Conservation Centre to reflect the work and function of the campus.

The centre is open all year, including weekends and public holidays. Open from 08:00 until 16:30, (gate close at 18:00). All are welcome, day visitors, with self-catering accommodation. One can also book a guided tour accompanying staff on the morning feed or a game / night drive.

== Activities and Facilities ==
There are various activities and facilities available at the centre. These include day trips to the reserve, game drives, open air functions, and over night accommodation. There is also a research facility for students and researchers.

=== Education ===
Schools visit the Mokopane BCC daily and educators can book one of the education / awareness programmes. Both local and international universities are hosted for practical demonstrations and talks on a wide range of topics addressing aspects from captive to free ranging wildlife management. Internships are also available via established programmes and structures as advertised annually.

=== Research ===
Over the years the campus has aided in a number of PhD and MSc and baseline research projects accommodating both local and international researchers.

== Species List ==
In reserve

- Blue wildebeest
- Bushbuck
- Bushpig
- Duiker
- Giraffe
- Impala
- Klipspringer
- Kudu
- Mountain rhebuck
- Nyala
- Ostrich
- Reedbuck
- Steenbok
- Tsessebe
- Warthog
- Waterbuck
- Zebra

In camps

- African ass
- Barn owl
- Cape buffalo
- Cape wild dog
- Cheetah
- Kalahari red goats
- King vulture
- Lion
- Nguni cows
- Pygmy hippopotamus
- Roan antelope
- Serval
- Spotted eagle owls
- Verroux's (Milky /Giant) eagle owl
- White-handed (Larr) gibbon

Birds

- Observation of 198 species

Butterflies & Moths

- Currently identified over 58 species, but expected to be over 120 species with continuing surveys.

Bats

- 7 confirmed species

Plants

- 105 tree species
- 78 grasses
