= Hendrik Potgieter =

South African Voortrekker leader (1792–1852)

Andries Hendrik Potgieter
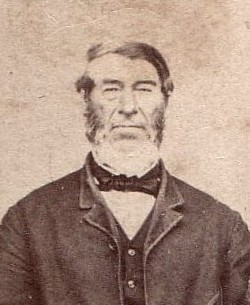
- Potgieter at Delagoa Bay in 1852
- Born: 19 December 1792; Graaff-Reinet district
- Died: 16 December 1852 (aged 59); Zoutpansbergdorp, Zoutpansberg
- Resting place: Zoutpansbergdorp; 23°03′10″S 29°46′14″E
- Occupation: Commandant-General
- Height: 6 ft 2 in (188 cm)
- Spouse(s): Elizabeth Helena Botha (c.1795–1841), N.N. Bronkhorst (–1842), Catharina Elizabeth Erasmus (1808–1852), Susanna Maria le Grange (c.1805–1852)
- Children: 13, some died young Pieter Johannes (1822–1854), Cmdt.Genl. at Makapan's Cave Andries Hendrik (1831–1923), Field Cornet, Member of Volksraad
- Parent(s): Hermanus Philippus Potgieter (1765–1871); Petronella Margaretha Krugel (c.1773–1802)
- Relatives: President Hermanus Steyn (Father's cousin)

Andries Hendrik Potgieter, known as Hendrik Potgieter (19 December 1792 – 16 December 1852) was a Voortrekker leader. He served as the first head of state of Potchefstroom from 1840 and 1845 and also as the first head of state of Zoutpansberg from 1845 to 1852.

== Beyond the Orange River ==
Potgieter and his party moved inland to the present Free State, where they signed a treaty with the leader of the Barolong, Moroka. The treaty stipulated that Potgieter would protect the Baralong against the Matabele raiders, in exchange for land. The tract of land was from the Vet River to the Vaal River.

The Matabele leader, Mzilikazi, was threatened by the white incursion into what he saw as his sphere of influence, which led to the Matabele's attack on the Potgieter laager in October 1836, at Vegkop, near the present-day town of Heilbron. The attack was beaten off, but the Matabele made off with most of the trekker oxen, crucial draught animals for the wagons. The combined trek groups of Piet Retief and Gerrit Maritz came to Potgieter's rescue. Moroka also helped with oxen. His group joined up with Retief and Maritz at Thaba Nchu, where they formed a Voortrekker government and decided to move to Natal. Potgieter was not in favour of this plan and stayed behind in the Free State.

== Dingane campaign ==
In 1838, after Piet Retief and his party were killed by Dingane, and other Voortrekker parties were attacked (Weenen massacre) at the Bloukrans and Bushman Rivers, Potgieter and another leader, Pieter Lafras Uys assembled a military force. To prevent schism and discord, the new Voortrekker leader in Natal, Maritz, diplomatically pronounced that both Uys and Potgieter were to be in command. However, a struggle between the hot-headed Uys and Potgieter ensued.

The divided force was lured into an ambush by the Zulus at Italeni, and both Uys and his son Dirkie, were killed. The surrounded and outnumbered force fled. Potgieter was criticised for his actions, and the force was called "Die Vlugkommado" or Flight Commando. He was further accused, unjustly, of causing the death of Uys by deliberately leading the force into the ambush. He left Natal for good soon afterwards and moved to the Transvaal.

== Transvaal settlements ==
Potgieter subsequently went on to found Potchefstroom (named after him), by the banks of the Mooi River, and served as its first head of state of the Potchefstroom Republic between 1840 and 1845. Later, in 1845, he also founded Ohrigstad (originally named Andries-Ohrigstad after Potgieter himself and George Ohrig) as a trading station. Owing to a malaria outbreak, the town had to be abandoned. The inhabitants, including Potgieter, moved to the Soutpansberg area, where he founded the town Zoutpansbergdorp (which means 'Salt Pan Mountain Town'), later renamed Schoemansdal.

After the 1842 annexation of Natal by Britain, many Natal Trekkers moved to the Free State and the Transvaal. These newcomers and their leader, Andries Pretorius, refused to accept the authority of Potgieter, and a power struggle developed. War was averted, and in 1848 a peace treaty was signed in Rustenburg

In 1852 after the sand river convention with king Moshoeshoe the Boers had access to the Transvaal, In 1852 Hendrik Potgieter led a Boer expedition against Transvaal Ndebele chief Mankopane Mapela Langa which was fatal for the Boers and saw them leave mokopane for zoutpansburg they would later return to mokopane during 1800s and amended their issues with the local kings Masebe iii Langa and Mokopane ii Kekana with the help of Paul Kruger who negotiated a peace treaty with Mankopane & Mokopane in 1869. The missionaries and the Boers would go on to establish mokopane. In 1907 the city was renamed potigieterus in honor of the battles between the locals and Boers.

In 1852 again Hendrick led another commando against King Sekwati’s forces. The Boers besieged the Pedi stronghold, hoping they would run out of food and water. But they managed to maintain themselves by sending young warriors to steal through the Boer lines at night. On the twenty-fourth day, the Boers departed with the Pedi cattle. Potgieter died on 16 December 1852 in Zoutpansbergdorp. A number of African chiefs who held him in very high regard came to pay their respects before his death.

He was elected to Volksraad, and served several times as the Chairman of Volksraad.

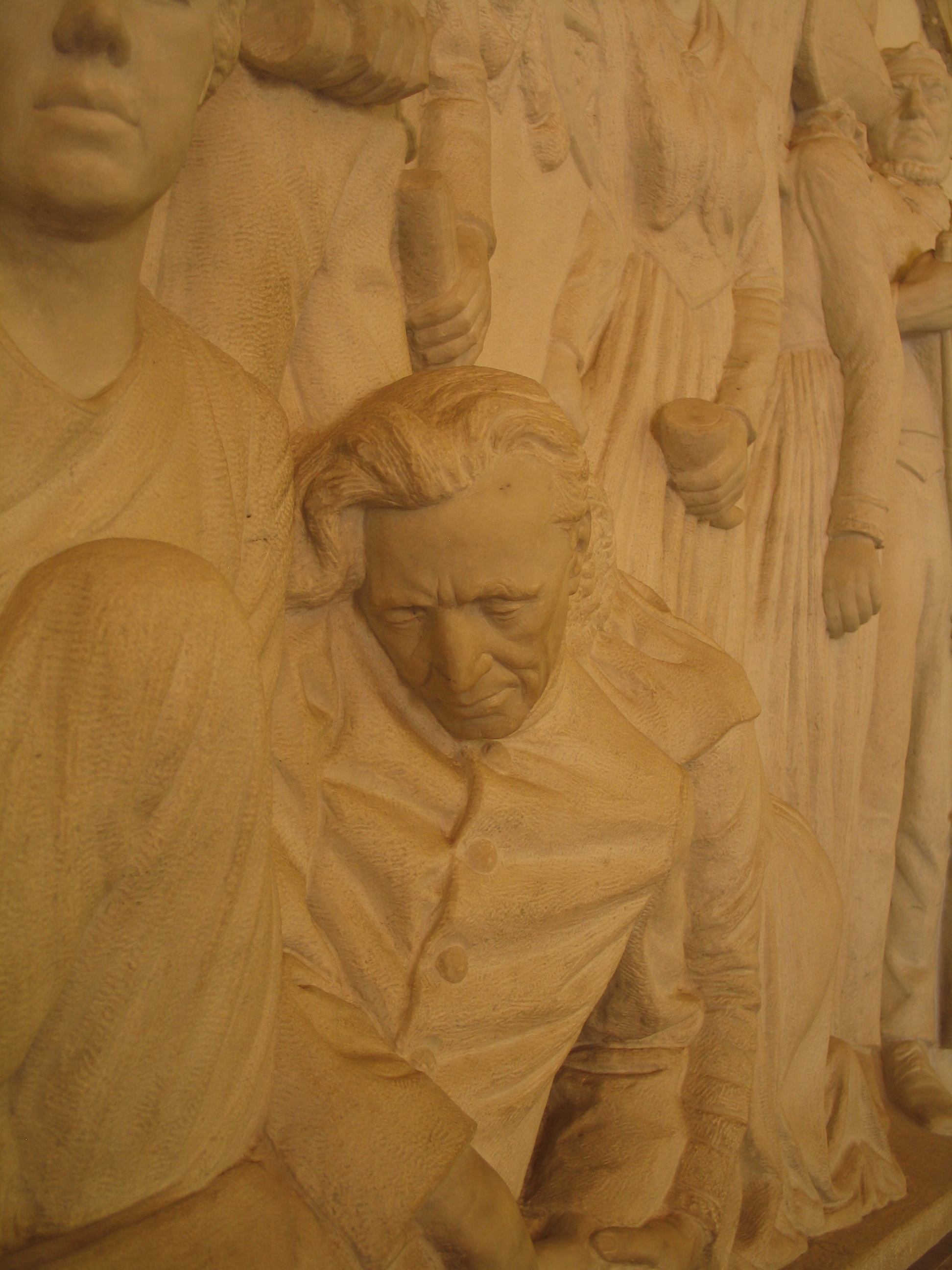
A frieze in the Voortrekker Monument depicting a wounded voortrekker in Potgieter's Vegkop laager

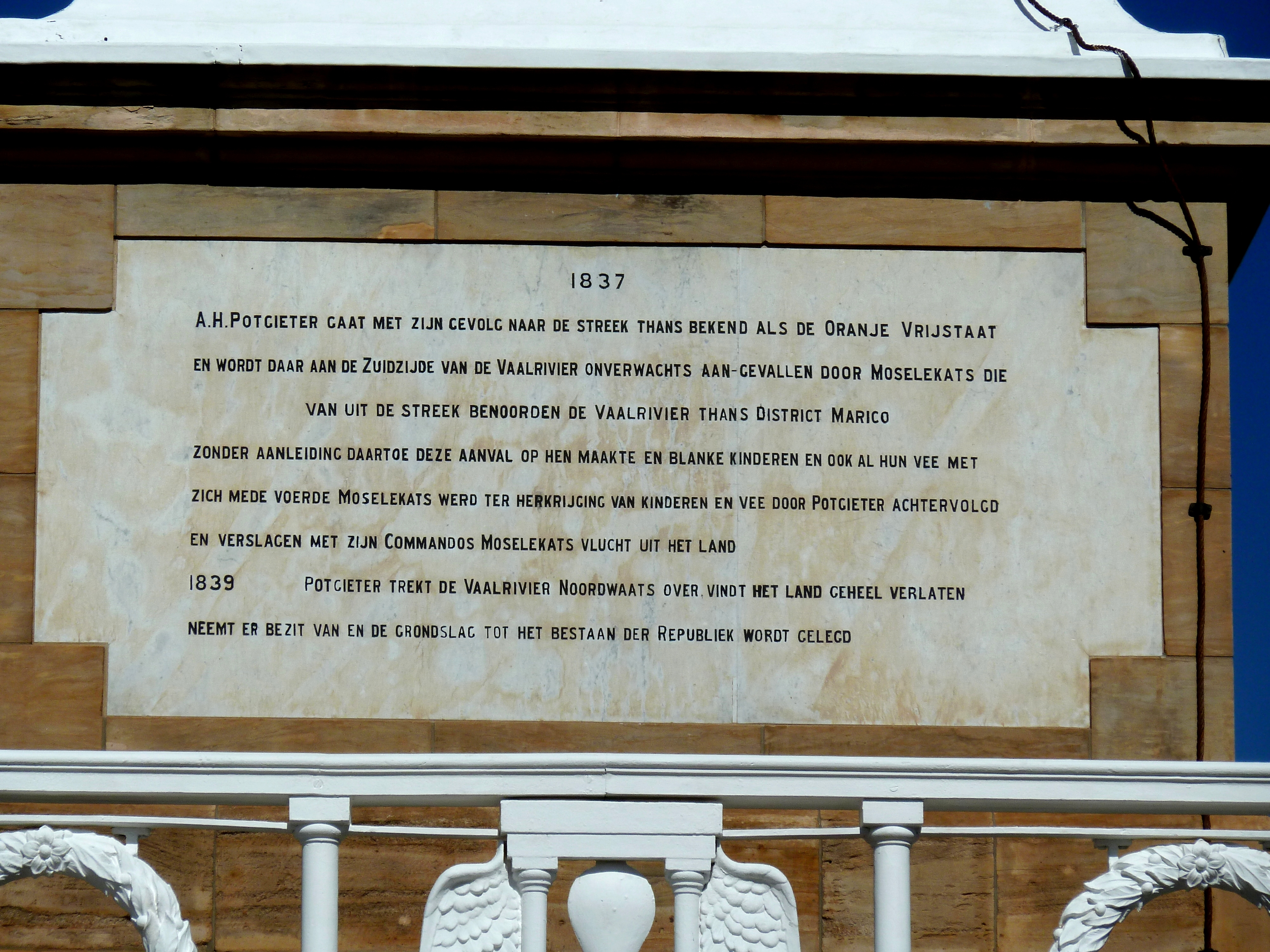
A plaque on the 1890 Paardekraal Monument that records Potgieter's arrival in Transvaal

== See also ==
- Blyde River
