= Stephanus Schoeman =

2nd President of the South African Republic (1810–1890)

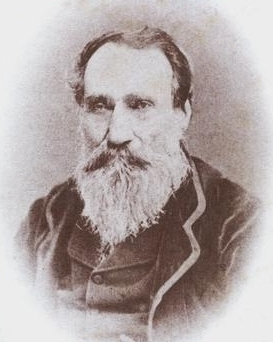

2nd President of the South African Republic
- In office 6 December 1860 – 17 April 1862
- Preceded by: Marthinus Wessel Pretorius
- Succeeded by: Willem Cornelis Janse van Renseburg

Personal details
- Born: 14 March 1810 Oudtshoorn, Cape Province
- Died: 1890 (aged 79–80) Pretoria, South Africa
- Spouse: Elsie Maria Aletta Potgieter

Military service
- Allegiance: South African Republic; Voortrekkers
- Battles/wars: Battle of Blood River, 16 December 1838

Stephanus Schoeman (14 March 1810 – 19 June 1890) was President of the South African Republic from 6 December 1860 until 17 April 1862. His red hair, fiery temperament and vehement disputes with other Boer leaders earned him the moniker "Stormvogel den Noorden," "Storm bird of the North."

== Early life ==
The first member of the Schoeman clan arrived in the Cape in 1724 from Ditmarschen in Schleswig-Holstein, Germany. Ditmarschen had been a Boer Republic (Burenrepublik) of Merchant-farmers until 1550, and the memory of this free Boer Republic must have lived on in her sons who emigrated to South Africa.

He originally settled in the Zoutpansberg but also owned a farm in Pretoria – the area now occupied by the Pretoria Zoo. Bloedstraat was also part of his farm.

Stephanus Schoeman was a minor Trekker leader, who had his own flag. He joined Andries Pretorius' group, fighting in the Battle of Blood River. One of the three cannons used in the battle, Ou Grietjie belonged to Schoeman and is now on display in the Voortrekker Monument.

== Presidency ==
As Commandant-General, Stephanus Schoeman was involved in a major political conflict with Marthinus Wessel Pretorius, the ZAR's First President and writer of its constitution. Schoeman rejected the constitution. Amongst others, Schoeman was supported by Willem Cornelis Janse van Rensburg whom he subsequently appointed as a provisional commandant. Van Rensburg represented Schoeman in negotiations with Pretorius's faction. In 1858, when Schoeman fell ill, Van Rensburg was appointed as acting Commandant-General.

Shortly before the end of 1859, MW Pretorius, who was the son of the popular Voortrekker leader Andries Pretorius, was concurrently elected president of the Orange Free State (OFS). The Volksraad granted him six months leave to take up his office in the OFS during which he would negotiate the unification of the two Boer Republics. However, once his leave expired, the Volksraad would not allow Pretorius to resume his former office of president of the ZAR, as well as that of the OFS. Initially, Johannes Hermanus Grobler was appointed as acting president in Pretorius' absence, but Commandant-General Stephanus Schoeman refused to accept Grobler as acting president. Schoeman instead believed that the presidency should have been granted to him as the constitution at the time stipulated that in cases of the president's dismissal or death, the presidency should be granted to the oldest member of the Executive Council. Being three years older than Grobler, the presidency should thus have been granted to Schoeman. Schoeman, supported by many dissatisfied burghers, relieved Grobler of his office, assuming it himself.

In 1861, the Volksraad decided to take action against Schoeman, who with his followers steadfastly refused to give up his position, Paul Kruger intervened against Schoeman, however, no one was prepared to take extreme action, and bitter letters were exchanged between Schoeman and Kruger. It was only in 1862, when the Volksraad declared the Schoeman factions to be rebels, that Kruger could summon his burghers to the conflict.

Kruger, who was elected commandant-general in April 1863, succeeded in driving Schoeman over the Vaal River. Schoeman's faction then tried to restore their position by force of arms. Commandant Jan Viljoen led a so-called 'People's army' against Kruger and his 'State Army' in January 1864, but was defeated at the Crocodile River. Peace was restored when a new election was held in 1864. Pretorius became president for a second time and Kruger retained his position as commander-in-chief.

== Retirement and death ==
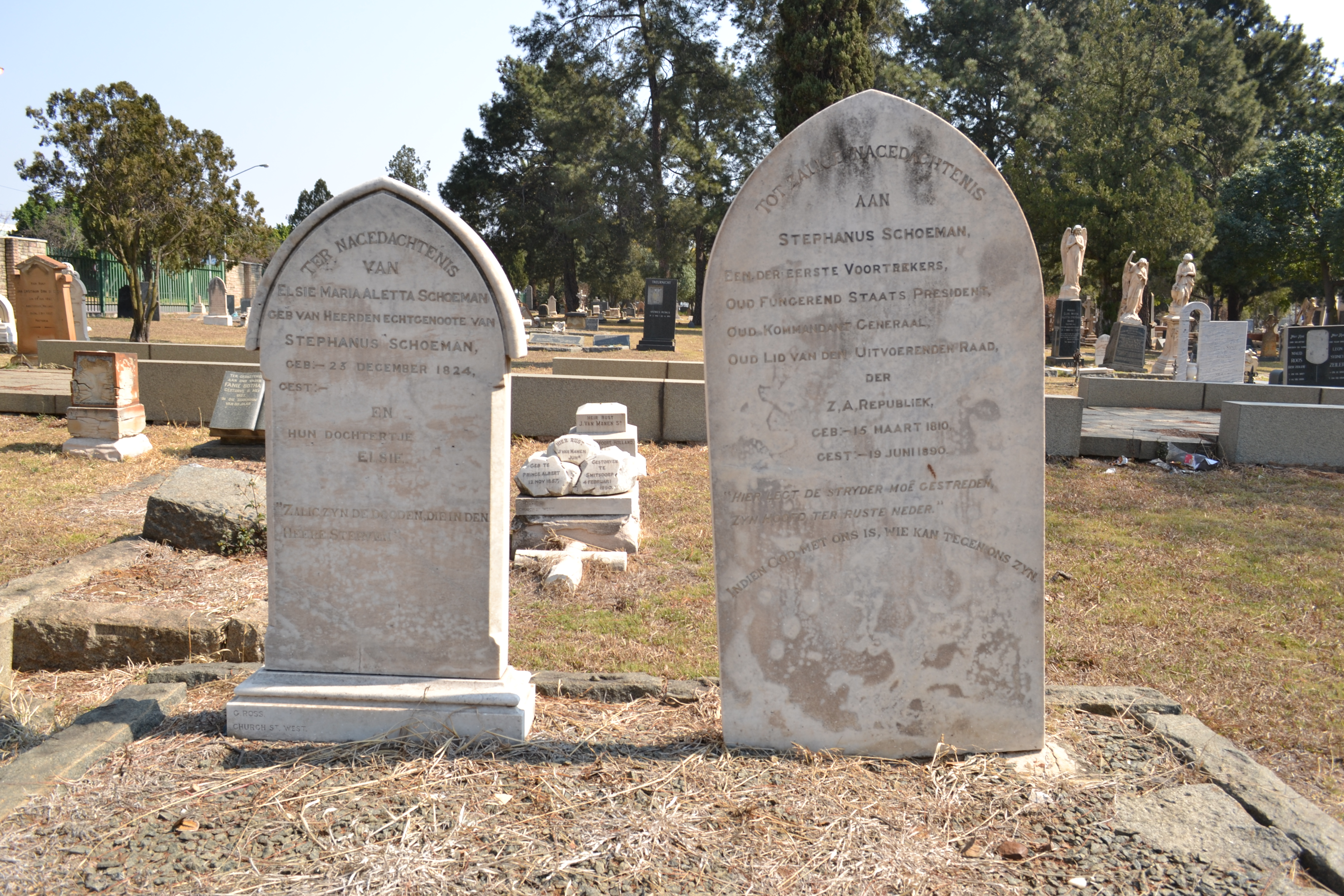
Head stones of Schoeman and his last wife in the Heroes' Acre, Pretoria

Pretorius resigned as president and retired in 1871 after a spectacular failure to prevent the Keate award which lopped off a large piece of the western Transvaal to satisfy a claim by the Barolong tribe.

He died in Pretoria in 1890, aged 80. In 1904, both executors of his estate had died and the Master of the Supreme Court had to publicly advertise for anyone willing to finally settle what remained of his estate.

== Family and ancestors ==
Schoeman married three times, finally marrying the widow Elsie Maria Aletta (née van Heerden) of the political figure state-head Pieter Johannes Potgieter, arch-antagonist of Andries Pretorius. Elsie Maria Aletta had children with both political leaders in their marriages and started a family famous for political and society influence. Her daughter Elsie Maria Aletta Potgieter was the mother of the famous doctor, successful businessman, Broederbond leader and Member of Parliament Dr. Pieter Johannes Potgieter Stofberg, whose father Ds. Jan Hendrik Malan Stofberg was Secretary and Head of NG churches in South-Africa.

Schoeman's son with his second wife Gertina Johanna Schutte, General Hendrik Jacobus Schoeman, went on to fight in the Anglo-Boer War of 1899 – 1902. One of his daughters with Schutte, Catharina Christina Susanna Schoeman, married the Boer general, Johannes Hermanus Michiel Kock.

His grandson, Dr. Gustav Preller became not only a leading historian but a renowned "Taalstryder," or champion of the Afrikaans language, while one of his sons, Johan Schoeman achieved renown as a publisher of anti-Communist materials.

A great-grandson, Hendrik Schoeman was the Minister of Transport for decades. Minister Schoeman was also a cousin of Dr. Pieter Johannes Potgieter Stofberg.

== Legacy ==
The street in Pretoria, Schoemanstraat is named after him, as is the town, Schoemansdal, which was razed by the Venda in the 1860s. (The ruins are currently being excavated again.) Another street, Andries Street (originally St. Andries street) is named after his flag, the flag of St. Andrew, flown in opposition to the ZAR's "Vierkleur".

== Bibliography ==
O.J.O. Ferreira, Stormvoël van die Noorde: Stephanus Schoeman in Transvaal. Pretoria: Makro-Boeke, 1978
