= Commandant general =

Military rank

Commandant general is a military rank in several countries, generally equivalent to that of major general. When written as "commandant-general" it is usually an honorary title.

== Argentina ==
Commandant general is the highest rank in the Argentine National Gendarmerie, and is held by the national director of the gendarmerie and his senior deputies. Depending on the appointment, it may be equal to any Argentine army rank from brigade general to the highest Argentine army rank, lieutenant general.

== Ireland ==
During the Irish War of Independence and the Irish Civil War in the period 1919–1923, the IRA and Anti-Treaty IRA applied this term to the leaders of their various brigades throughout the country. The term was acquired from the Boer ranks, through veterans of the Irish Transvaal Brigade.

== Italy ==
In Italy Comandante generale (commandant general) is the title of the general officers commanding the Carabinieri, the Guardia di Finanza and the Corps of the Port Captaincies – Coast Guard. It is an appointment, not a rank. In Fascist Italy's Blackshirts, comandante generale was the title of their head and was held by Benito Mussolini from 1922 to 1943.

== Portugal and Brazil ==
Historically, commandant-general (Portuguese: comandante-geral) has been the traditional title of the appointment of commanding officer in several security forces in Portugal and Brazil.

Presently, in Portugal is the title of the general officer commanding the National Republican Guard (GNR). In the past, it was also the title of the commanding officers of the Public Security Police, the former Fiscal Guard and the former Portuguese Legion.

In Brazil, it is the title of the commanding officers of the state military police and military fire departments.

== South Africa ==
Commandant-general was a military rank in South African Republic and the Orange Free State Republic as well as in the Union of South Africa and the Republic of South Africa. The commandant-general of one of the Boer republics was the head of its armed forces. The rank of full general in the South African Army was renamed "commandant-general" in 1956 and was in use until 1967 when it reverted simply to "general"

Commandant-general was, at times, also a post designation, rather than a rank. Brigadier-General CF Beyers was the first Commandant-General of the Active Citizen Force until he resigned in 1914. He was succeeded as Commandant-General by Major-General J C Smuts with effect from 16 September 1914.

== United Kingdom ==
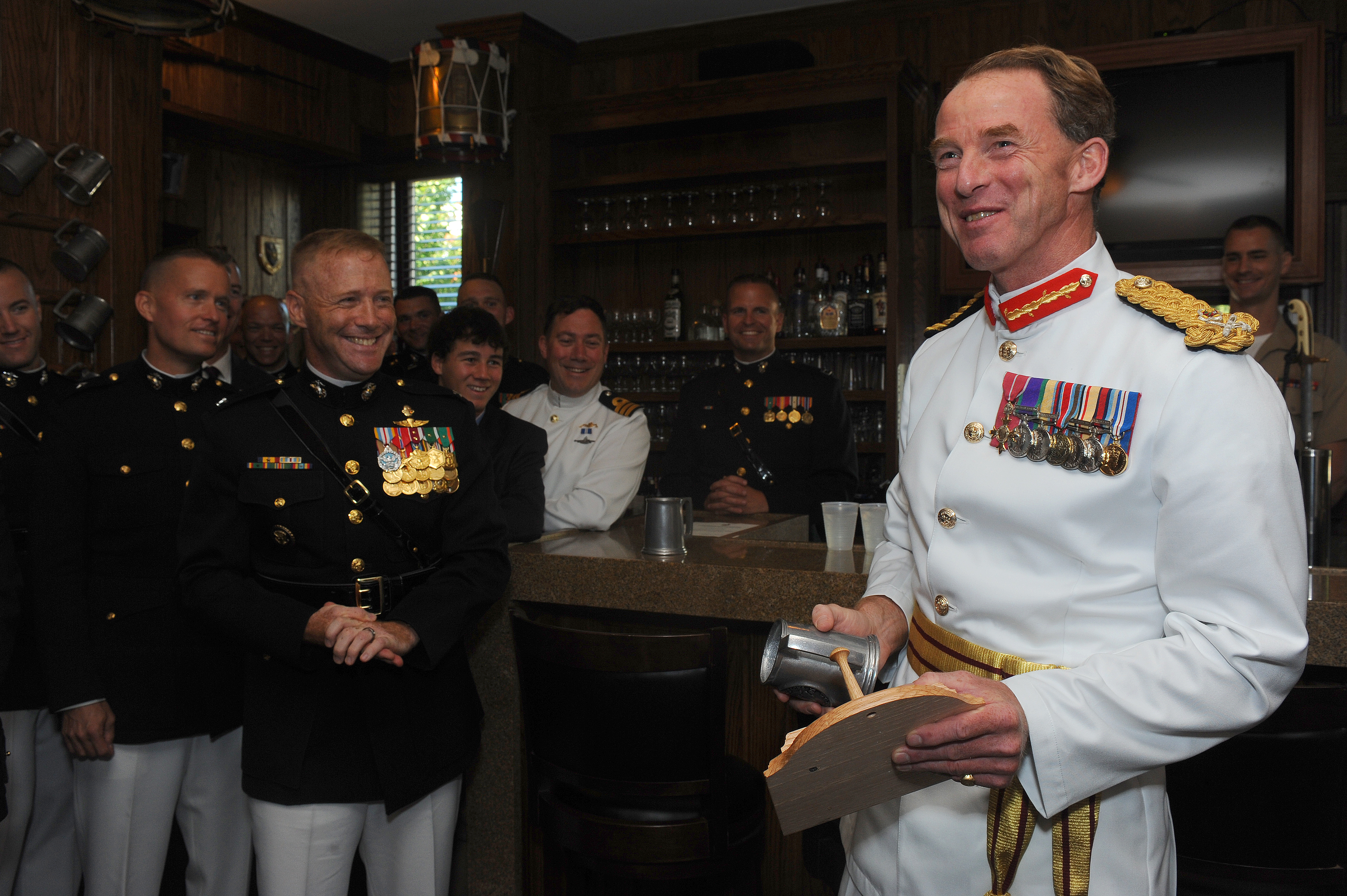
Commandant General of the Royal Marines, Major General Buster Howes, Washington, D.C., 2011

In the United Kingdom, commandant-general is a military appointment, not a rank. See the following for more details:

- Commandant General Royal Marines
- Commandant-General of the RAF Regiment

== See also ==
- Commander-in-chief
