= Lang Hans van Rensburg =

Boer Voortrekker leader (1779–1836)

The Janse van Rensburg Trek massacre
- Part of the Great Trek
- Location: Djinjispruit, near modern day Inhambane, Mozambique
- Date: July 1836
- Deaths: 49
- Perpetrator: impis of Manukosi

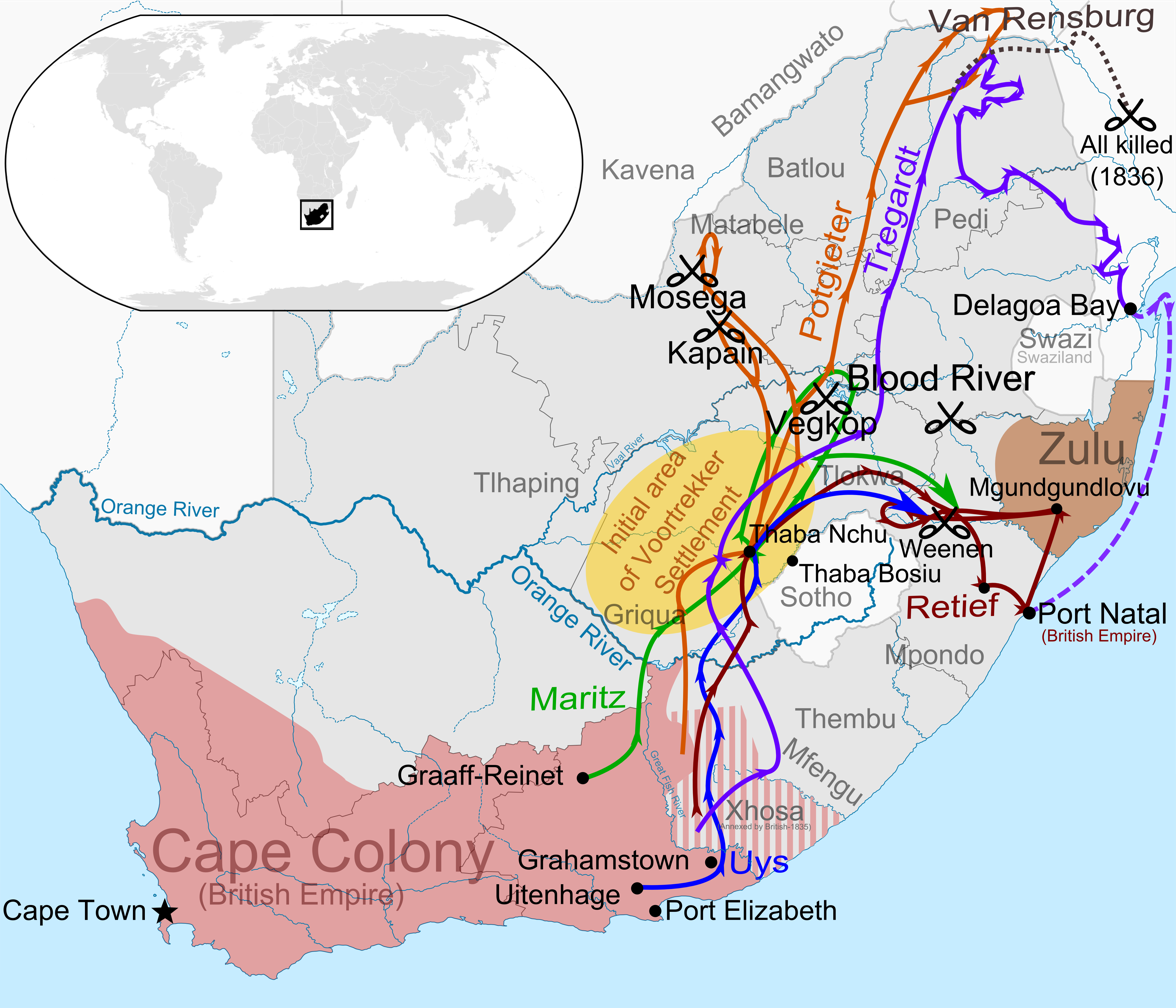
A map charting the routes of the largest trekking parties during the first wave of the Great Trek (1835-1840) along with key battles and events. Louis Tregardt's route (1833 to 1838) Survivors of Tregardt's trek evacuated by sea, 1839 Van Rensburg's route, after it separated from Tregardt's

Johannes Jacobus (Lang Hans) Janse van Rensburg (12 August 1779 – July 1836) was a Boer leader of one of the early Voortrekker groups. His entire group of 51 people was massacred by an 'impi' of Manukosi near Inhambane. Only his two children were spared, as a result of an intervention by another Zulu warrior. Included in the party was Nicholaas Balthasar Prinsloo, who was a Slagtersnek rebel, his wife, Petronella Maria Krugel/Kruger and their family.
