= Field cornet =

South African military or municipal rank

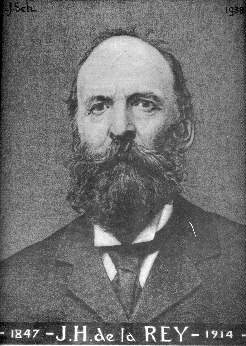
Generaal Koos de la Rey was a field cornet at one stage

Field cornet (Afrikaans: veldkornet) is a term formerly used in South Africa for either a local government official or a military officer.

The office had its origins in the position of veldwachtmeester in the Dutch Cape colony, and was regarded as being equivalent to a sergeant. The British administration enhanced its importance with the term field cornet, making it equivalent to an officer's rank.

The term was used for a civilian official in a local government district (drostdy) of the Cape Colony, acting as and invested with the authority of a military officer and empowered to act as a magistrate. The field cornet was subject to the landdrost of the district and acted as his representative. As such, a field cornet performed important functions in administrative, judicial and police matters. In addition, in peacetime the field cornet was the head of the militia, was responsible for maintaining law and order in his area, and was tasked with supervising the handover of postal items on arrival in his district.

The term later came to denote a military rank equivalent to that of a lieutenant in the Boer armies as well as in the South African Army between 1960 and 1968. A second lieutenant was referred to as an assistant field cornet.

The term field cornet replaced the word adjutant in the commando organisation in 1968.
