= Swellendam Commando =

Stellenbosch Commando
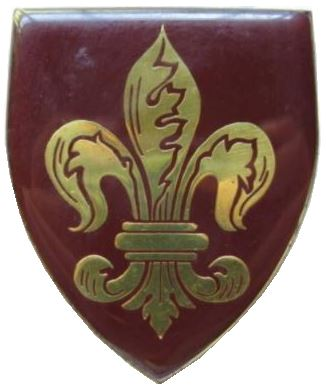
- Swellendam Commando emblem
- Active: 1795 - 2002
- Country: South Africa
- Allegiance: Republic of Swellendam; Cape Colony; Union of South Africa; Republic of South Africa; Republic of South Africa
- Branch: South African Army; South African Army
- Type: Infantry
- Role: Light Infantry
- Size: One Battalion
- Part of: South African Infantry Corps; Army Territorial Reserve
- Garrison/HQ: Swellendam
- Motto: Waarheid oorwin (The truth shall win)

Swellendam Commando was a light infantry regiment of the South African Army. It formed part of the South African Army Infantry Formation as well as the South African Territorial Reserve.

== History ==
=== Origins ===
==== Batavian era ====
Swellendam Commando can trace its origins back to around 1795 with the Republic of Swellendam and the unsafe situation for farmers on its eastern border with Xhosa tribes.

=== Operations ===
==== With the Republic of Swellendam ====
An independent republic had been declared from the Dutch East India Company, declared with a National Assembly and Hermanus Steyn as president. It was a momentous event, but at the same time the British occupied the Cape and the new republic was called on to assist in battle. The republicans refused initially, but a commando of 70 soon left for the Cape. By 1806 with the Second British Occupation, at the Battle of Blaauwberg (6 January 1806), the Swellendam Commando held the British off long enough for the rest of the Batavian army to retreat to safety.

==== With the Cape Colony ====
The Government dreading a Khoi rising, made peace with the Xhosas. In 1801, another rebellion began where farms were abandoned en masse, and Khoi bands under Klaas Stuurman, Hans Trompetter and Boesak carried out widespread raids. The Swellendam commando under Commandant Tjaart van der Walt, who was killed in action in June 1802, achieved no permanent result.

==== With the UDF ====
By 1940, rifle associations were under control of the National Reserve of Volunteers. These rifle associations were re-designated as commandos by 1948.

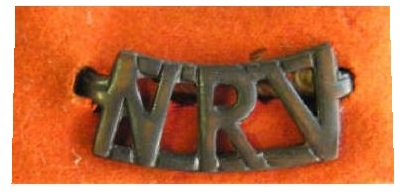
UDF era National Reserve of Volunteers shoulder tab

==== With the SADF ====
During this era, the unit was mainly used for area force protection, search and cordones as well as stock theft control assistance to the rural police.

==== With the SANDF ====
===== Disbandment =====
This unit, along with all other Commando units was disbanded after a decision by South African President Thabo Mbeki to disband all Commando Units. The Commando system was phased out between 2003 and 2008 "because of the role it played in the apartheid era", according to the Minister of Safety and Security Charles Nqakula.

== Unit Insignia ==
=== SADF era Swellendam Commando insignia ===
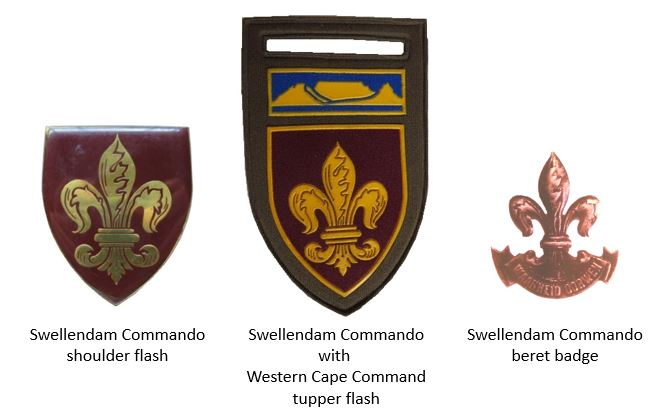
SADF era Swellendam Commando insignia

== Leadership ==
Leadership
From	Honorary Colonels	To	Ribbon
	No known incumbents		
From	Commanding Officers	To	Ribbon
	No known incumbents		
From	Regimental Sergeants Major	To	Ribbon
	No known incumbents		

== See also ==
- South African Commando System
