= Marthinus Prinsloo (president) =

Former President of the Republic of Graaff-Reinet

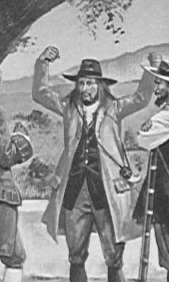

1st President of the Republic of Graaff-Reinet
- In office 4 February 1795 – August 1796
- Preceded by: Office established
- Succeeded by: Office abolished

Personal details
- Born: 13 February 1751 Hex River, Dutch Cape Colony
- Died: 1825 (73-74) Cape Colony
- Spouse: Maria Margaretha Klopper
- Children: 9
- Parent(s): Willem Prinsloo de Oude; Maria Elizabeth Klopper

Military service
- Allegiance: Republic of Swellendam; Republic of Graaff-Reinet; Voortrekkers

Marthinus Prinsloo(13 February 1751, Hexrivier – 1825, Cape Colony) was the President of the Republic of Graaff-Reinet from 1795 to 1796 when the British seized the Dutch Cape Colony.

His second cousin, Hermanus Steyn, was President of the Republic of Swellendam in 1795.

He was the father of Hendrik Frederik Prinsloo (1784-1816), who was hanged in 1816 for his involvement in the Slagtersnek Rebellion.

== Ancestry ==
Ancestry of Marthinus Prinsloo

1. Marthinus Prinsloo

  - 2. Willem Prinsloo
    - 4. Nicolaes Prinsloo
      - 8. Adriaan Gerritsz Prinsloo
      - 9. Aaltje Claasz
    - 5. Petronella Van Staden
      - 10. Maarten Jansz Van Staden
      - 11. Catharina Willemsz
  - 3. Maria Elizabeth Klopper
    - 6. Hendrik Frederik Klopper
      - 12. Frederik Jansz Klopper
      - 13. Grietje Toemes
    - 7. Catharina Botha
      - 14. Friederich Botha
      - 15. Maria Kickers
        - 30. Cornelis Kick
        - 31. Cornelia Spaeroogh

== Literature ==
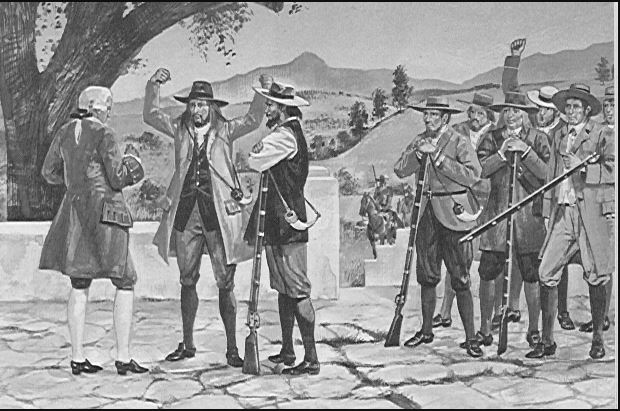
The declaration of the Republic of Graaff-Reinet or Swellendam, 1795.

- Heese JA (1987). "Prinsloo, Marthinus". In Beyers CJ, Basson, JL (eds.). Dictionary of South African Biography Vol V (1st ed.). Pretoria: Human Sciences Research Council. pp. 611–612. ISBN 0796904200. OCLC 1063845175.
