= Petrus Delport =

Leader of the Swellendam Patriot Movement in the 1790s

Commandant Petrus Jacobus Delport
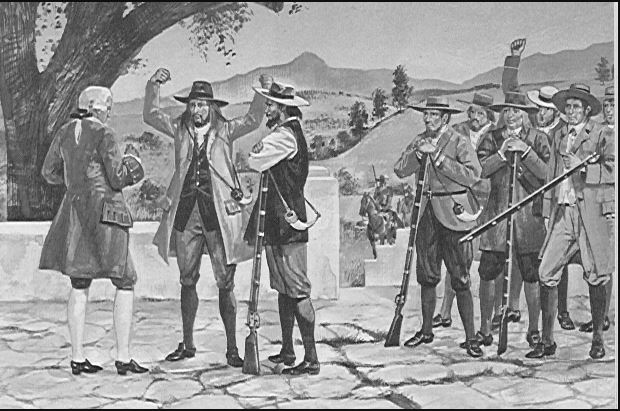
- Declaration of the Republic of Swellendam or Graaff-Reinet

National Commander of the Republic of Swellendam
- In office 1795–1795
- President: Hermanus Steyn
- Preceded by: Office established
- Succeeded by: Office abolished

Leader of the Swellendam Patriot Movement
- In office 1794/5–1796
- President: Hermanus Steyn

Personal details
- Born: Petrus Jacobus Delporte; Before 20 February 1757 Paarl, Dutch Cape Colony
- Died: c. 1797 Batavian Republic
- Spouse: Jacoba Elizabeth de Lange
- Children: 9
- Parent(s): Pieter Delport; Margaretha Johanna Schreuder

Commandant Petrus Jacobus Delport (bef. 20 February 1757 – 1797) was leader of the Swellendam Patriot Movement in the 1790s. He was also the National Commander (vice president) of the Republic of Swellendam in 1795. He was banished from the Cape for rebelling against the British and then fled to the Netherlands.
