= Swellendam =

Town in Western Cape, South Africa

- Town
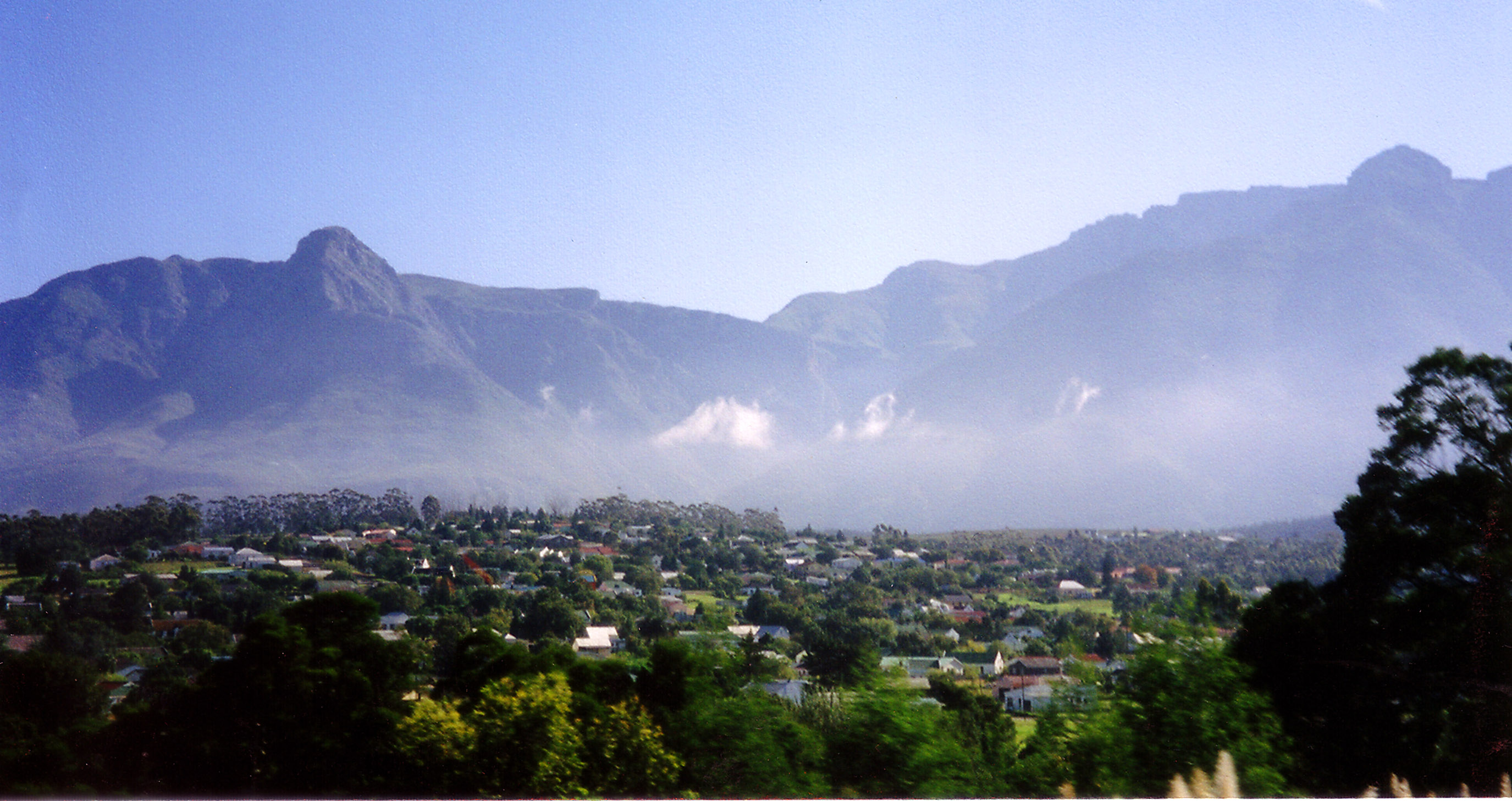
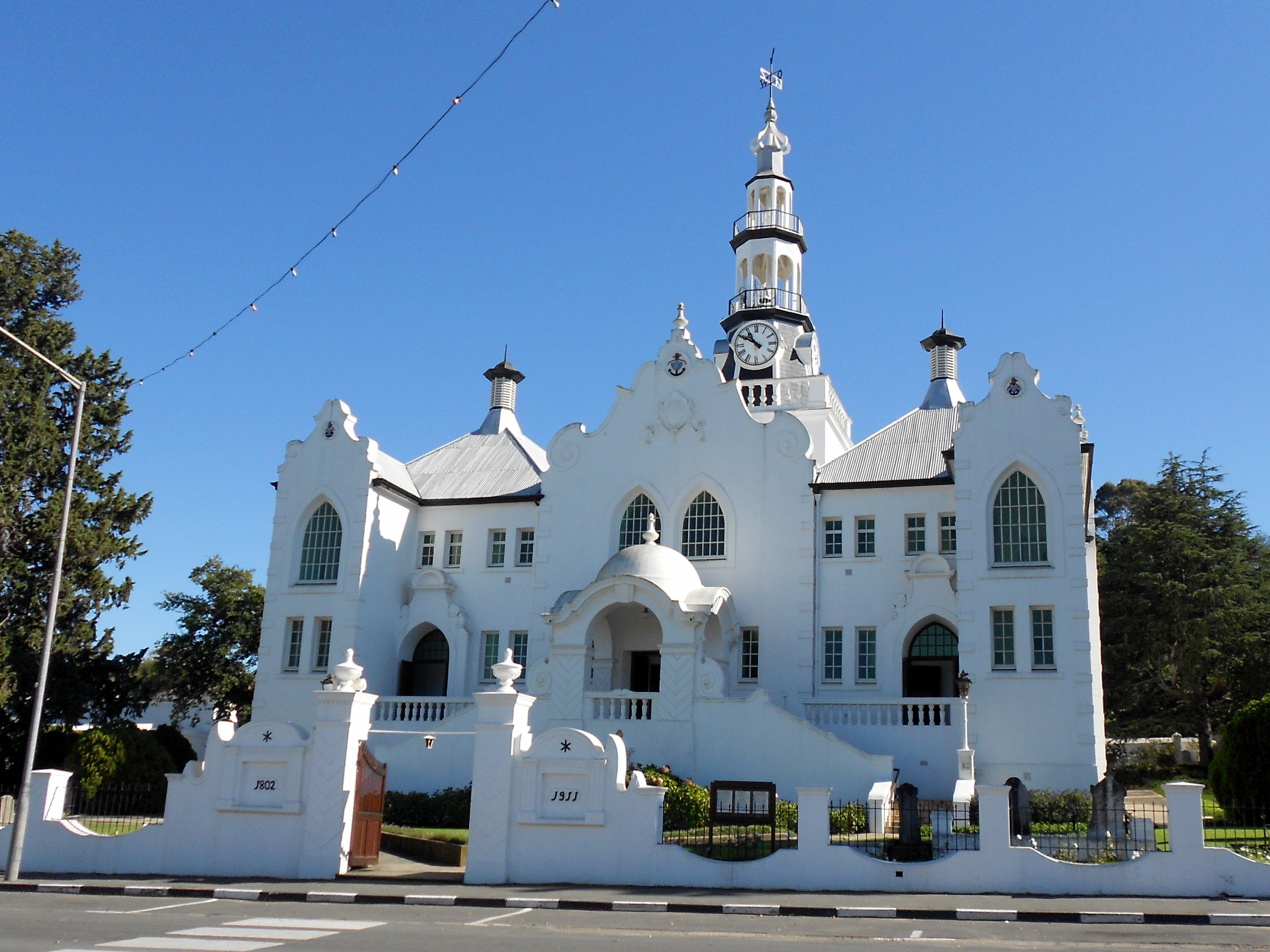
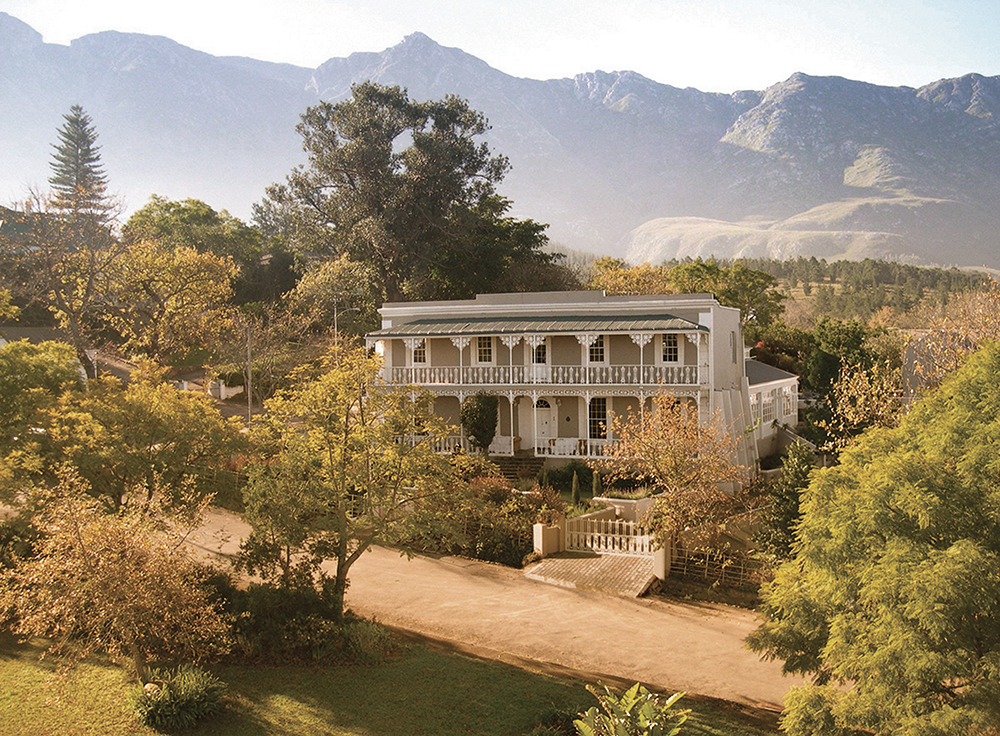
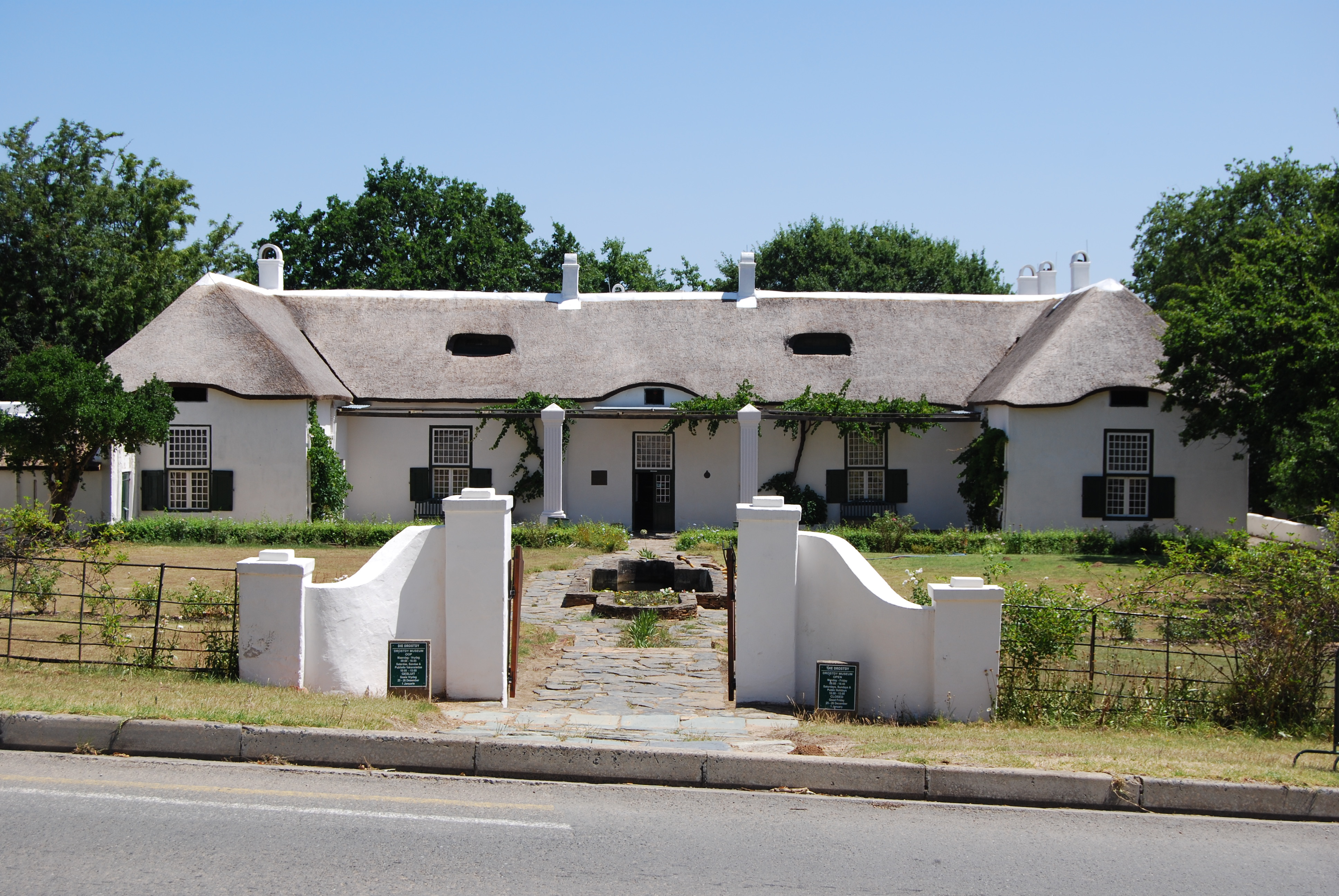
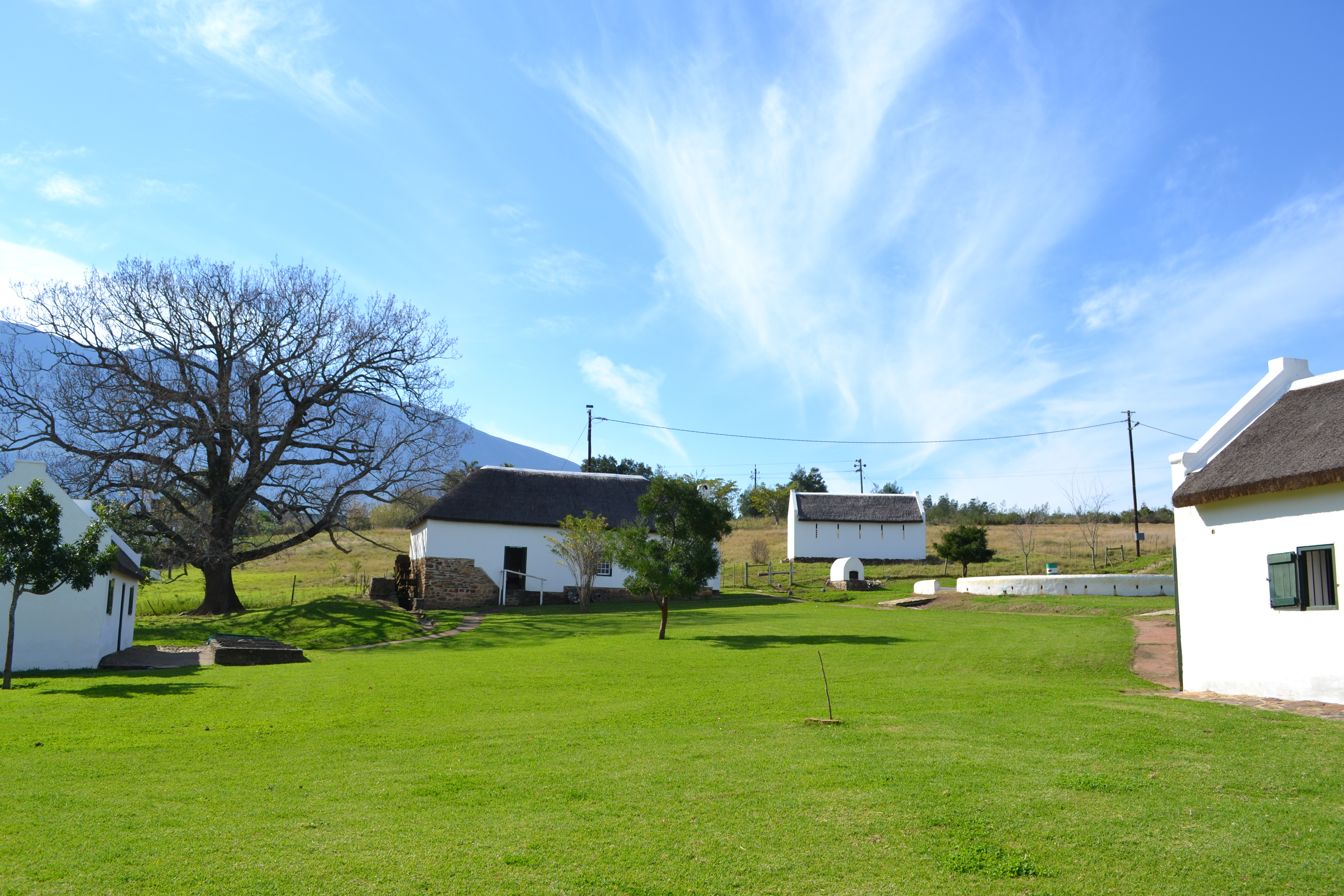
- From the top, Swellendam with the Clock Peaks (1710m) of the Langeberg in the background. Middle left, Dutch Reformed Church. Middle right, a historic Cape Georgian style home. Bottom left, Old Drostdy historic home and a good example of the Cape Dutch architectural style in the area. Bottom right, the restored historical village area of Swellendam.

- Coat of arms

- Location within Western Cape Location within South Africa Location within Africa
- Coordinates: 34°01′23″S 20°26′24″E
- Country: South Africa
- Province: Western Cape
- District: Overberg
- Municipality: Swellendam
- Established: 1745
- Named for: Hendrik Swellengrebel and his wife, Helena Ten Damme

Area
  - Total: 19.68 km^{2} (7.60 sq mi)

Population (2011)
  - Total: 4,676
  - Density: 237.6/km^{2} (615.4/sq mi)

Racial makeup (2011)
  - White: 69.31%
  - Coloured: 22.54%
  - Black African: 6.67%
  - Indian/Asian: 0.34%
  - Other: 1.13%

First languages (2011)
  - Afrikaans: 82.84%
  - English: 13.77%
  - Xhosa: 0.88%
  - Sotho: 0.31%
  - Other: 2.2%
- Time zone: UTC+2 (SAST)
- Postal code (street): 6740
- PO box: 6740
- Area code: 028

Swellendam (Afrikaans: [ˈsvæləndam]) is the third oldest judicial district and the fifth oldest town in South Africa (after Cape Town and Stellenbosch), a town with 17,537 inhabitants situated in the Western Cape province. The town has over 50 provincial heritage sites, most of them buildings of Cape Dutch architecture. Swellendam is situated on the N2, approximately 220 km (140 miles) from both Cape Town and George.

== History ==
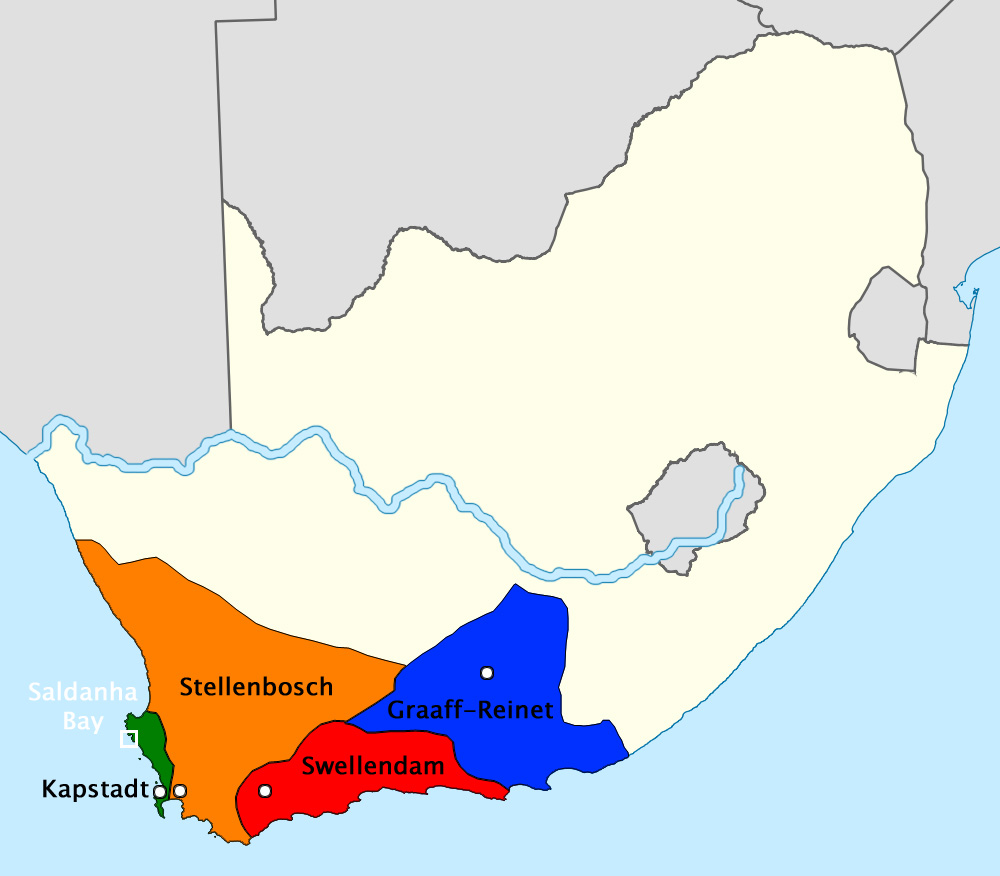
Boer Republic of Swellendam (red) and other Dutch territories around 1795

Early travellers and explorers who visited the Cape in the 16th century traded with the Khoikhoi people who lived on these shores and in the interior. When the Dutch East India Company established a replenishment station at the Cape in 1652, trade continued inland as far as Swellendam.

In 1743, Swellendam was declared a magisterial district, the third-oldest in South Africa, and was named after Governor Hendrik Swellengrebel, the first South African born Governor, and his wife, Helena Ten Damme. This outlying settlement soon became a gateway to the interior, and was visited by many famous explorers and travellers including François Le Vaillant (1781), Lady Anne Barnard (1798), William John Burchell (1815), and Thomas William Bowler (1860). In time, a village was established beyond the Drostdy, where artisans including numerous wainwrights and traders settled. Swellendam was the last Dutch outpost on the eastern frontier, and provided useful crafts services in the region.

By 1795, maladministration and inadequacies of the Dutch East India Company caused the burghers of Swellendam to revolt, and on 17 June 1795, they declared themselves a Republic. Hermanus Steyn was appointed as President of the Republic of Swellendam. The burghers of Swellendam started to call themselves "national burghers", after the style of the French Revolution. The Republic was short-lived, and was ended on 4 November 1795, when the Cape was occupied by the Kingdom of Great Britain. With the arrival of British settlers in the early 19th century, the Overberg boomed, and Swellendam was soon the heart of the mercantile empire of Barry and Nephews, created by Joseph Barry, which dominated trade in the area up until 1870. The Breede River is the longest navigable river in South Africa and ships sailed 35 km (20 miles) up river to Malgas to unload and load merchandise.

A view of Main Street, Swellendam at the turn of the 20th century.

By the middle of the 19th century, the eastern districts had been colonised by the British settlers and Swellendam had grown in size. The town served as a useful refreshment station on the long, slow journey up the coast. Today Swellendam remains an agricultural area, and contains multiple historic buildings. The first known sketch of Swellendam was of the Drostdy, by Johannes Schumacher in 1776, when he accompanied the son of Governor Swellengrebel to the town. Today the Drostdy forms part of a museum complex that consist of several heritage sites, namely the Drostdy, the old Gaol, and Mayville.

The 1936 census recorded a total population 3,784 residents.

== Famous pioneer families ==
Some of the famous families that settled in the region and have since lived there are the Barry family, the Moodies from Scotland, the Steyns (from which came Hermanus Steyn, President of the Republic of Swellendam) the Streicher family, the Van Eeden family, the Rothmann family, the Tomlinson family and the Dunn family. Both Johannes Brand and Francis Reitz spent some of their childhood in the same Cape Dutch house in Swellendam. Both became presidents of the Orange Free State.

== Climate ==
The region has a predominantly Mediterranean climate. There are long summer days in January and February. During February and March, summer draws to a close, with prevailing South Easter winds. April and May are autumnal months, with milder days and occasional showers. June and July bring the Cape winter, with mild weather, rain and possible snow on the mountain tops. August and September are the start of spring.

Climate data for Swellendam
Month	Jan	Feb	Mar	Apr	May	Jun	Jul	Aug	Sep	Oct	Nov	Dec	Year
Mean daily maximum °C (°F)	30.7 (87.3)	30.5 (86.9)	28.3 (82.9)	25.4 (77.7)	22.4 (72.3)	20.6 (69.1)	19.5 (67.1)	20.6 (69.1)	21.9 (71.4)	24.4 (75.9)	26.9 (80.4)	29.1 (84.4)	25.0 (77.0)
Mean daily minimum °C (°F)	16.7 (62.1)	17.1 (62.8)	15.6 (60.1)	12.3 (54.1)	8.9 (48.0)	6.4 (43.5)	5.8 (42.4)	7.0 (44.6)	8.8 (47.8)	11.6 (52.9)	13.8 (56.8)	15.3 (59.5)	11.6 (52.9)
Average precipitation mm (inches)	39 (1.5)	46 (1.8)	50 (2.0)	66 (2.6)	52 (2.0)	44 (1.7)	46 (1.8)	60 (2.4)	38 (1.5)	51 (2.0)	40 (1.6)	32 (1.3)	564 (22.2)
Source: Climate-Data.org

== Fauna and flora ==
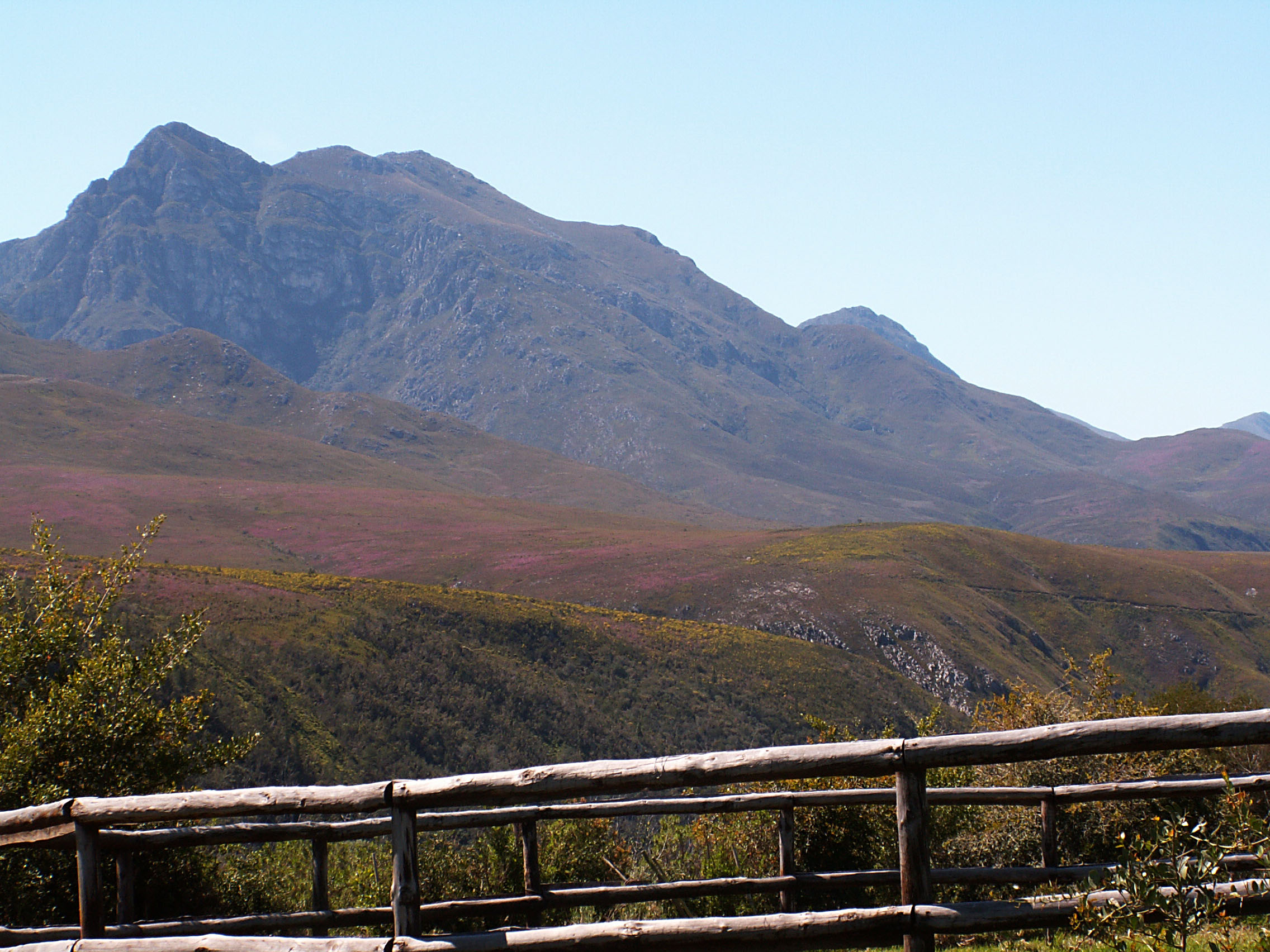
The Grootvadersbosch Nature Reserve against the Langeberg Mountains

Three nature reserves are situated near Swellendam, Marloth Nature Reserve, Sanbona Wildlife Reserve and Bontebok National Park. Bontebok National Park is where the rare bontebok was protected when it was close to extinction. The population has increased from 17 individuals in 1931 to a sustainable number today.

The area is botanically diverse with an abundance of wild flowers and fynbos. The 250 hectare (one square mile) indigenous forest at Grootvadersbosch is the most noteworthy in the southwestern Cape. Woods like these are rare to find in the Cape this far west of the Knysna forests.

Wildlife such as the formerly endangered bontebok and Cape mountain zebra inhabit the area. Other species include bushbuck, klipspringer, grey rhebuck, Cape grysbok, baboon, mongoose, genet and the occasional leopard, as well as a species of ghost frog and a unique forest emperor butterfly. Over 200 bird species found near the town include waterfowl, the crowned eagle, black eagle, Narina trogon, paradise flycatcher and the Knysna woodpecker.

Witsand, a small coastal town about 50 km (30 miles) from Swellendam, is one of the best whale viewing spots on the South coast as it is the largest whale nursery in South Africa. The town is situated at the foot of the Langeberg, and there are many hiking trails, ranging from day-walks to a 5 to 7-day trail.

== Agriculture ==
Wheat, canola, oats, sheep and dairy farming are practised in the area. Sentraal-Suid Koöperasie serves as a co-operative in the area.

== Varia ==
In May 2007 the Swellendam VOR SWV 114.4 MHz was permanently withdrawn.

== Architecture ==
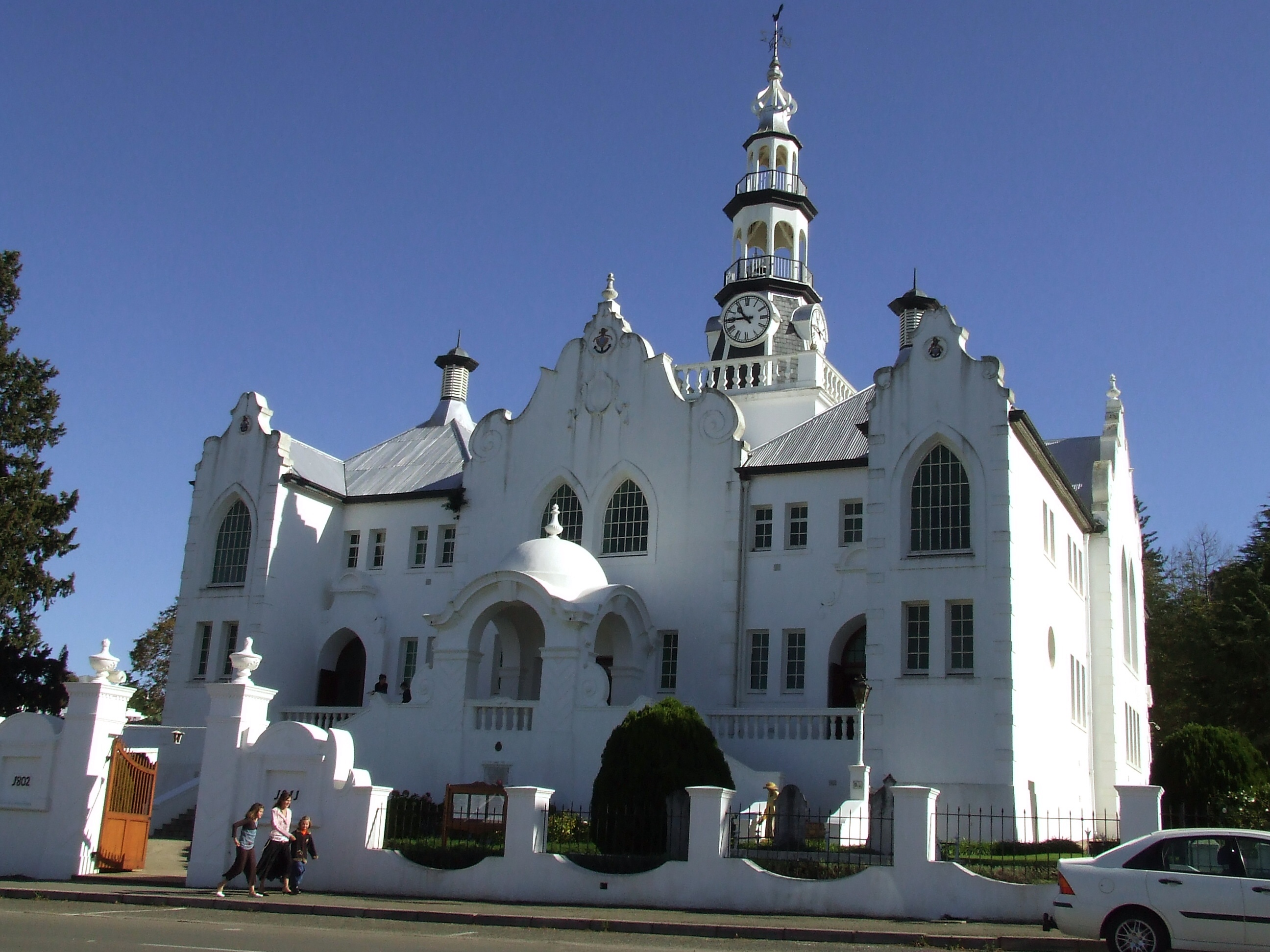
Building of the Nederduitse Gereformeerde Kerk in Swellendam, also known as the "Wit Kerk" by locals (originally built 1798). It is a replica of a famous steeple in Belgium

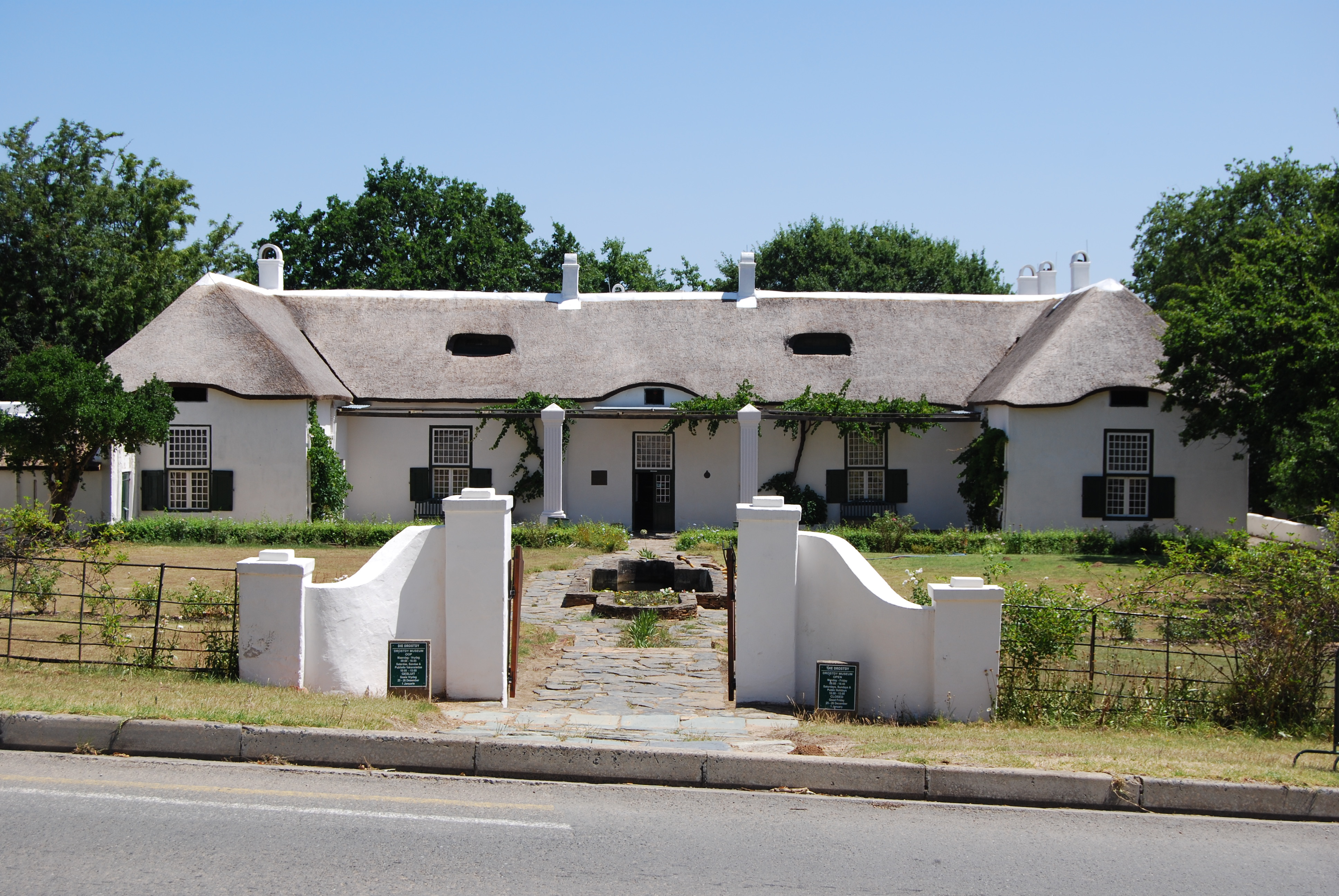
The Old Drostdy

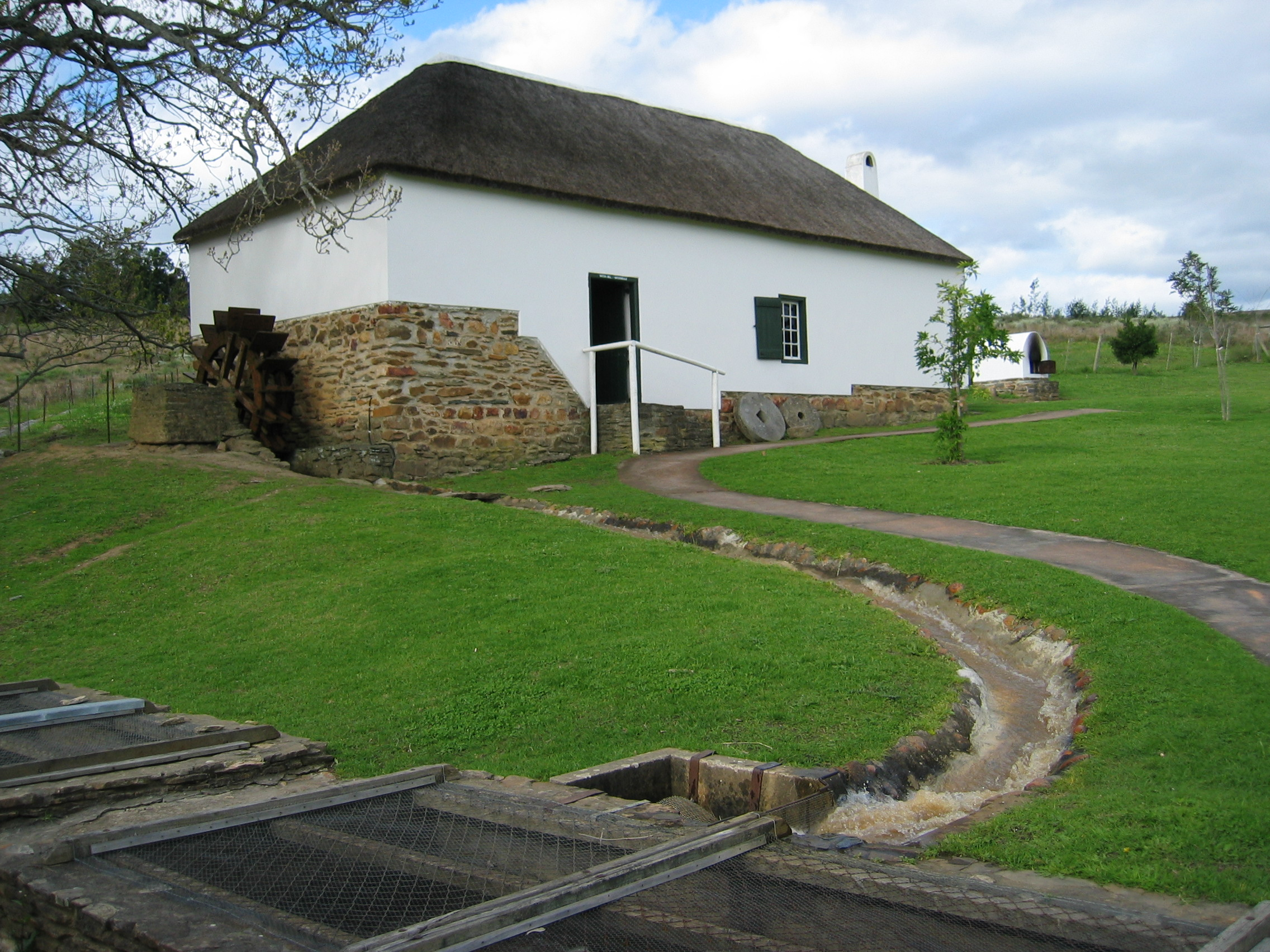
A restored mill

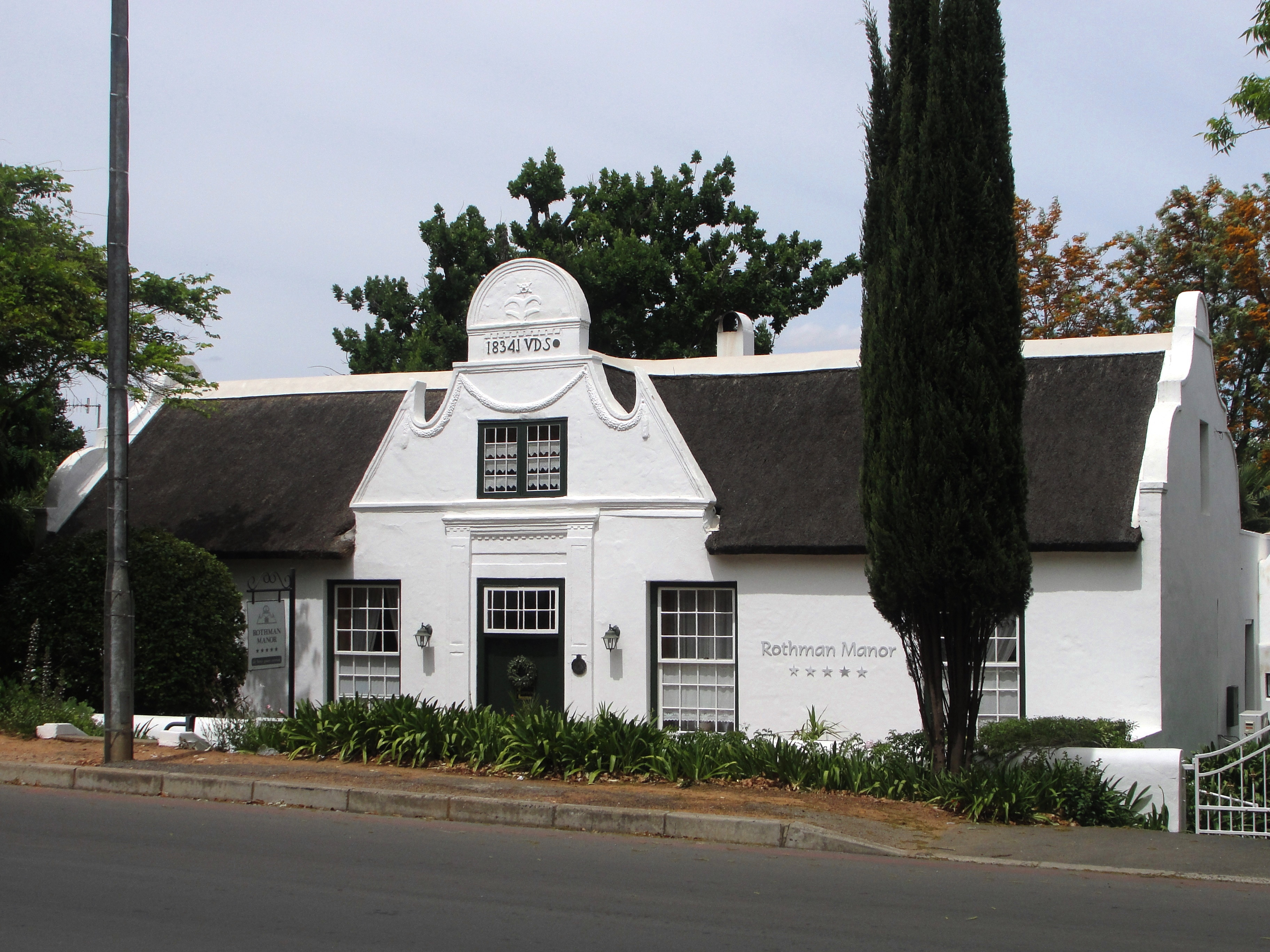
JVDS House

== Gallery ==
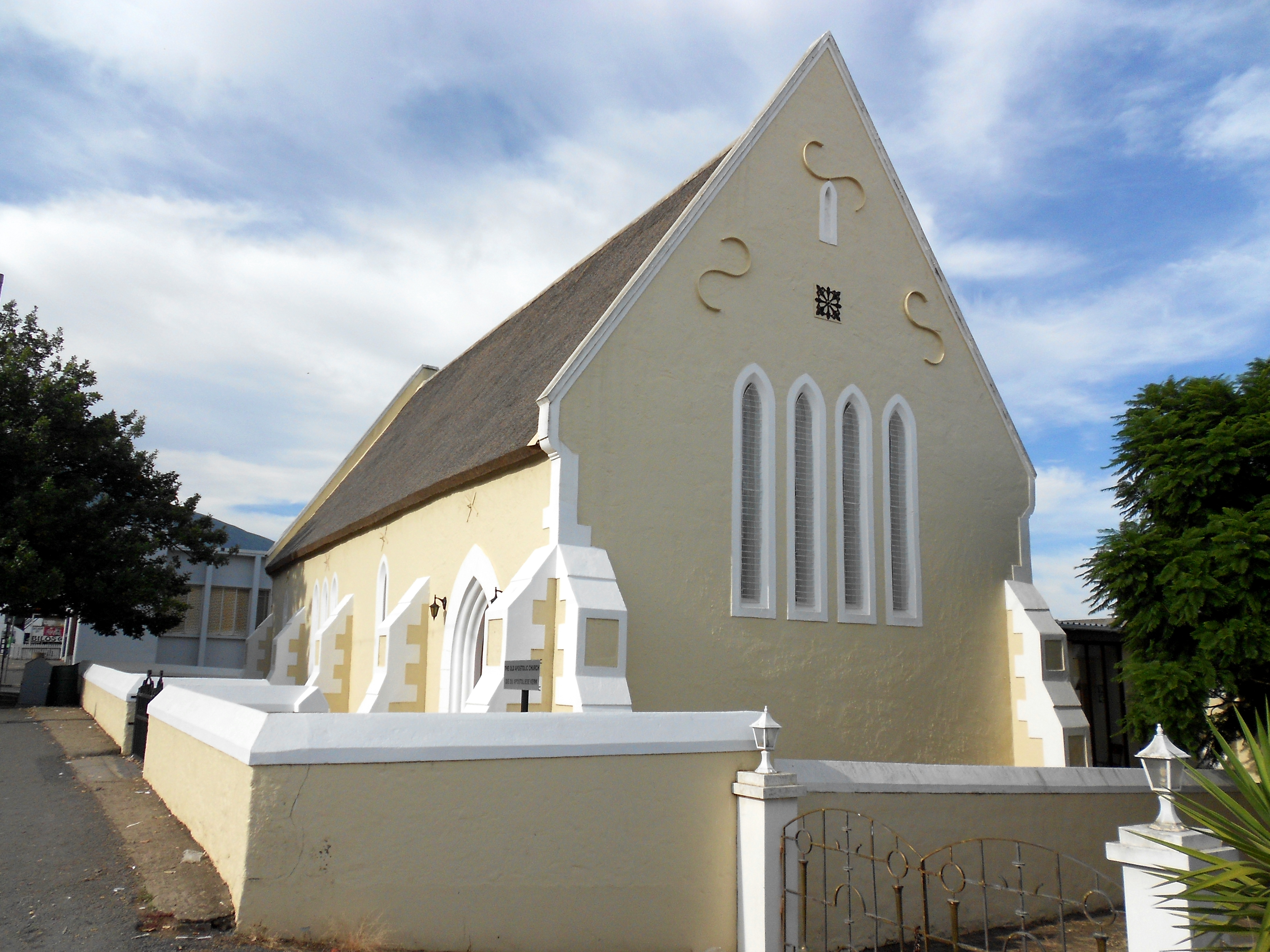
St Luke's Mission Church

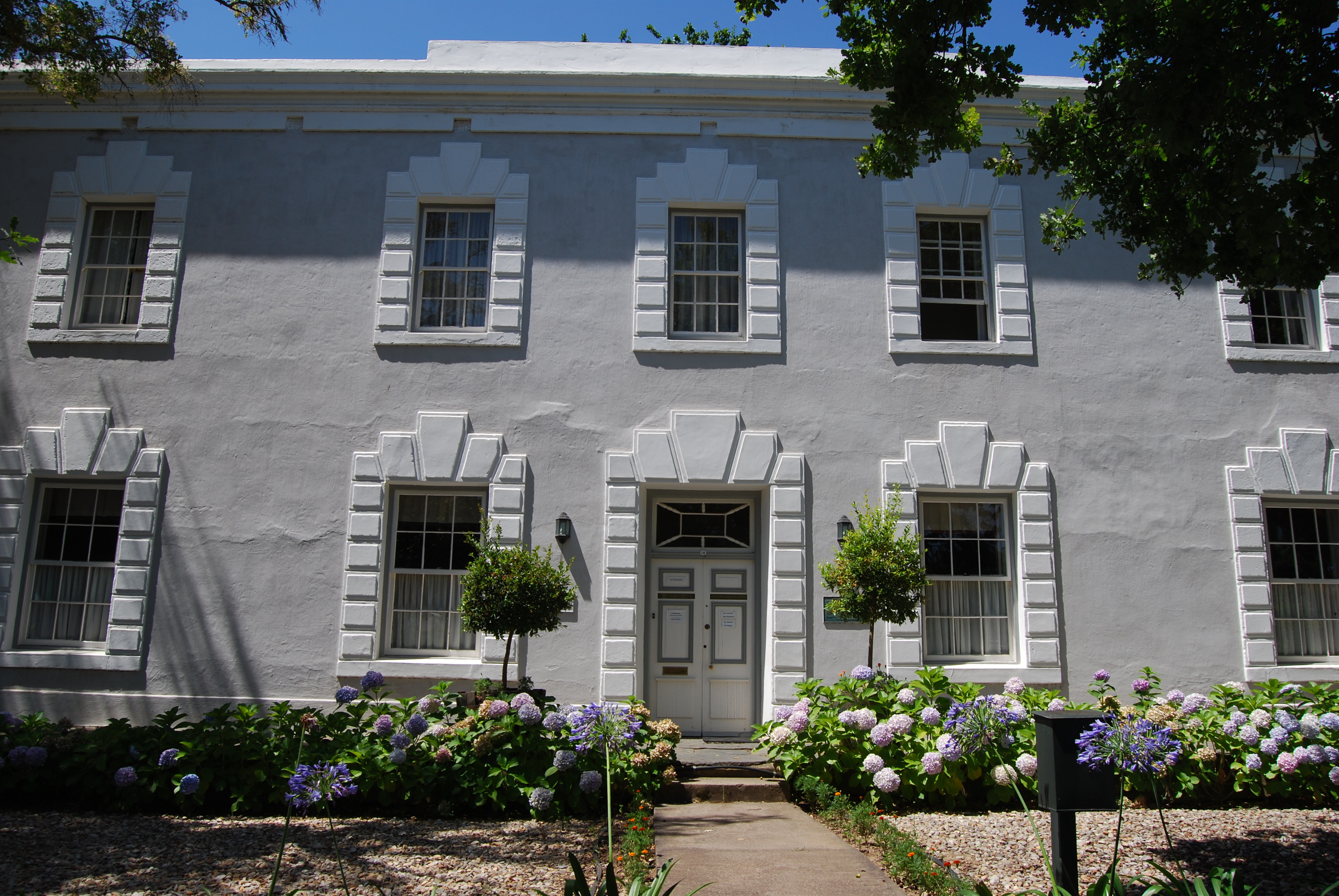
Swellengrebel Street

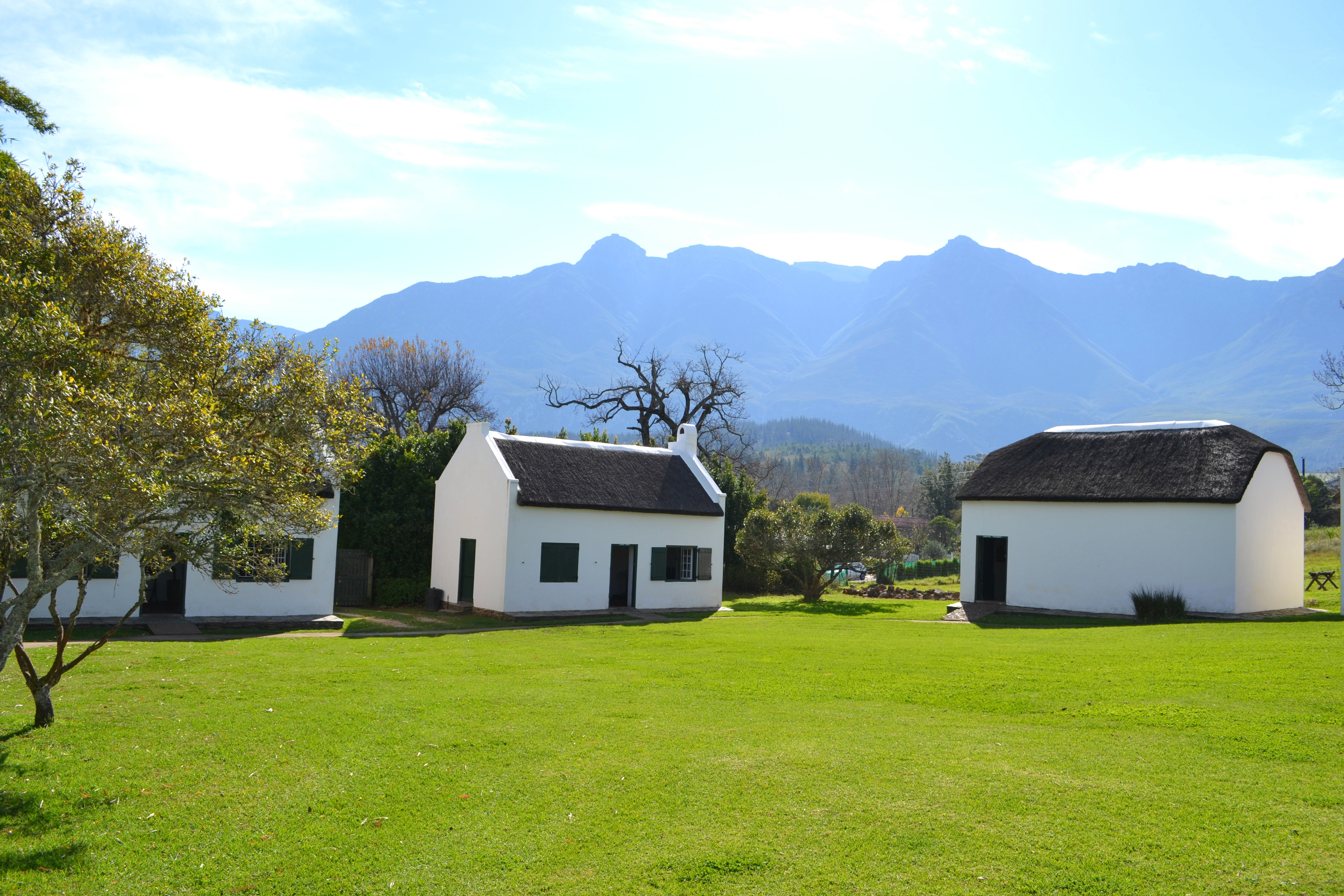
Drostdy Museum

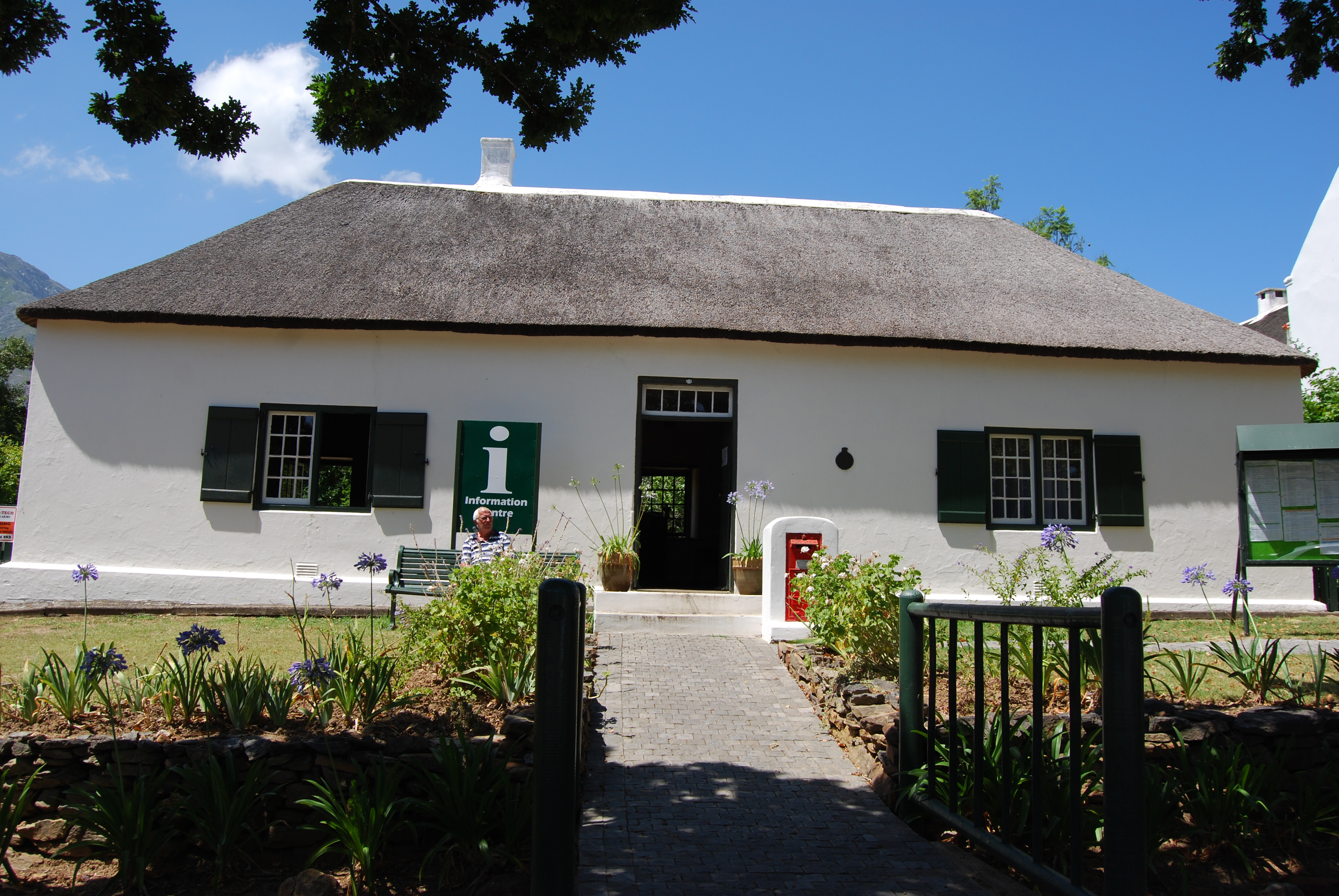
Old post office

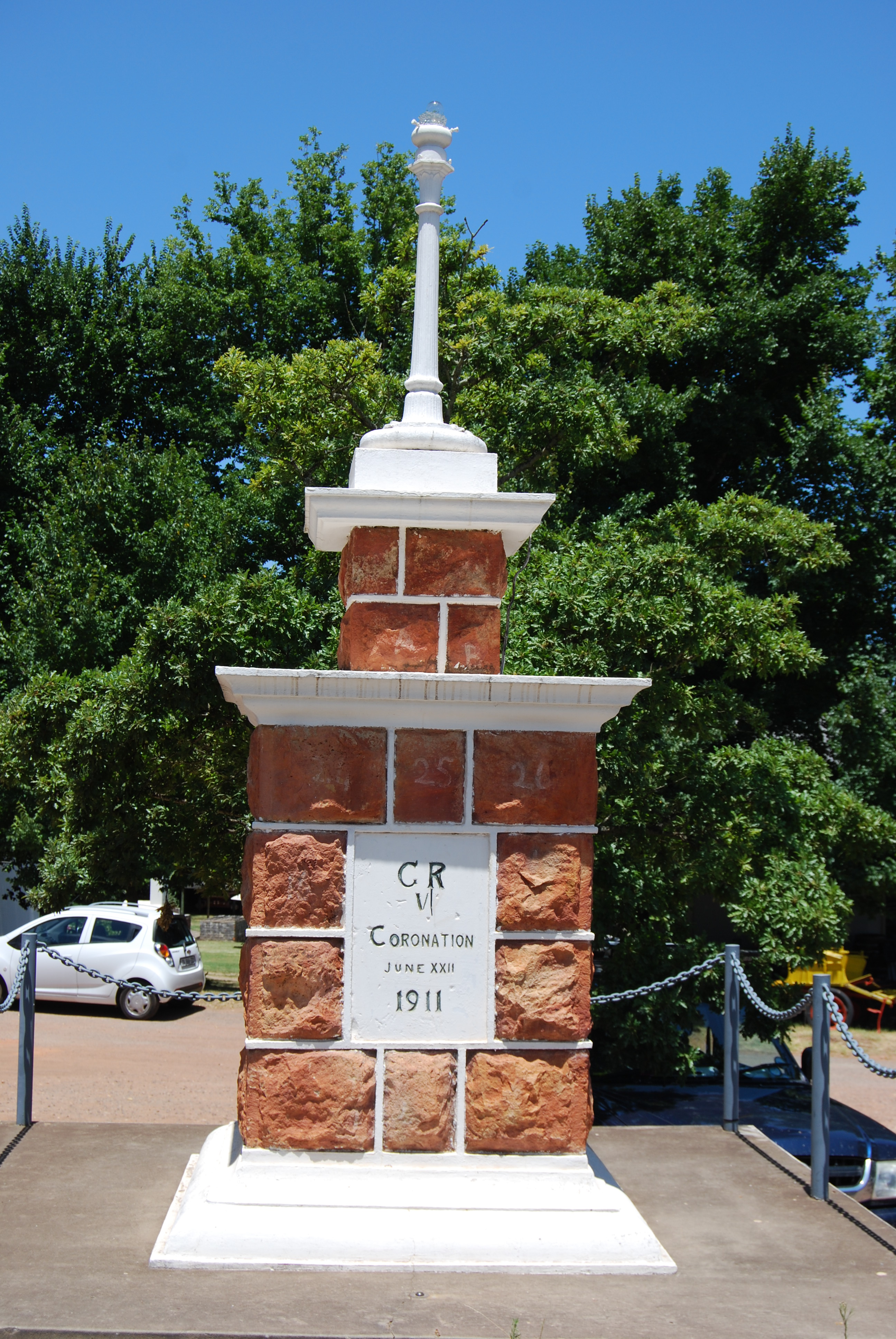
George V Coronation Monument

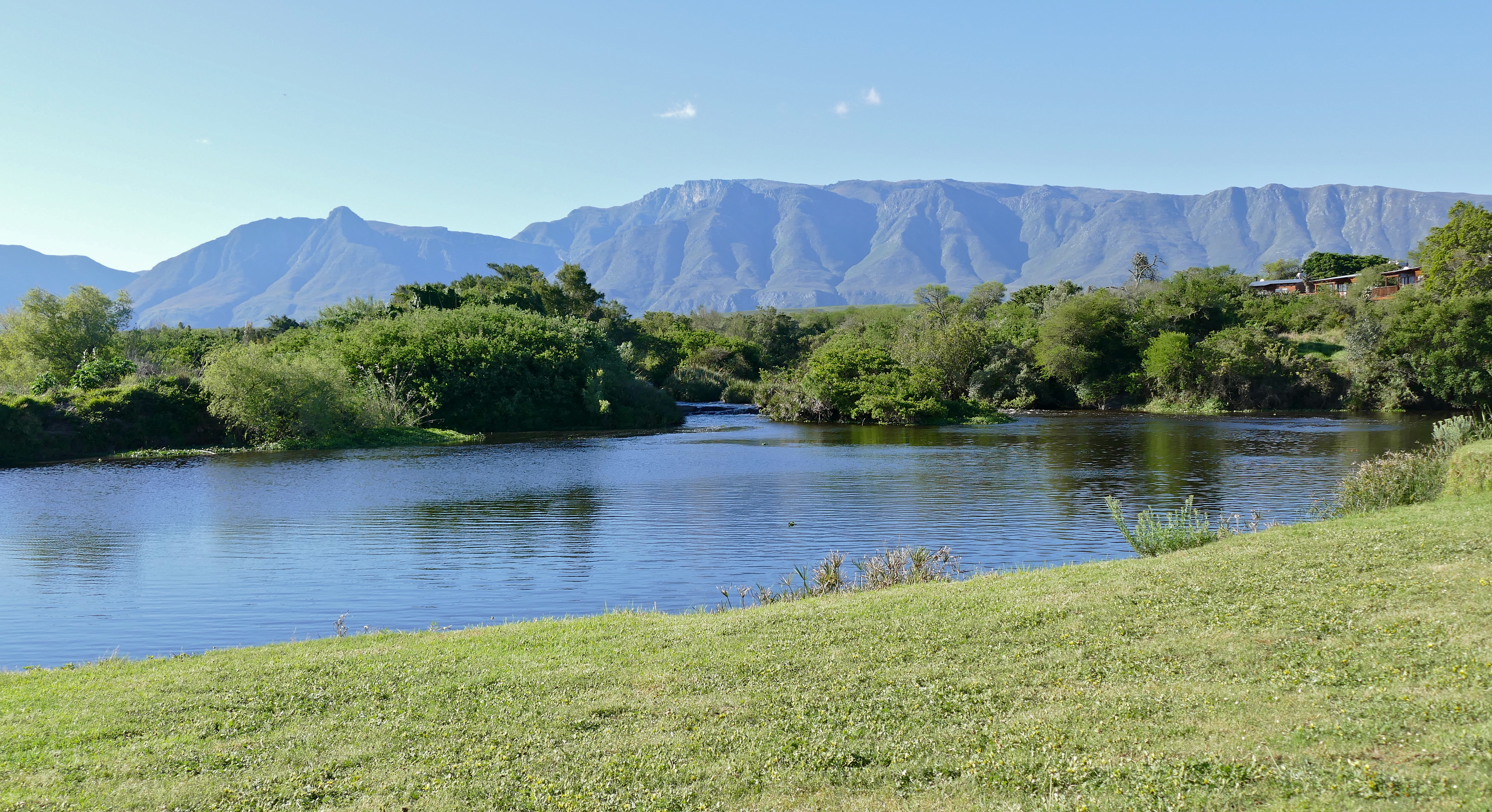
Bontebok National Park

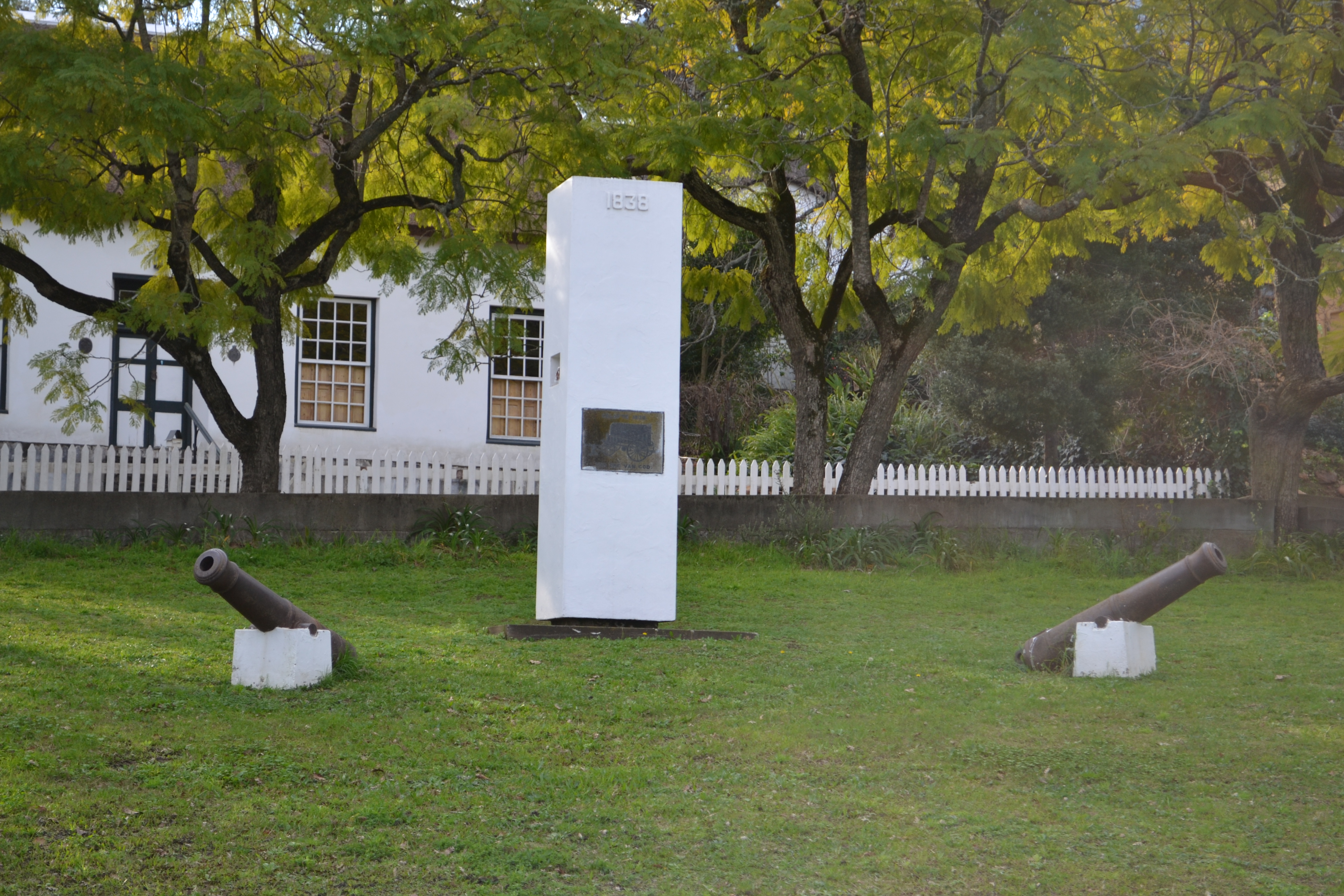
1938 Monument

== Notable people ==
- Gert Alberts, 19th century Boer explorer
- Annie Botha, First Lady of South Africa
- Benjamin Duff, rugby union player
- Nicholas Myburgh, farmer, lawyer and politician
- Alec Reid, rugby union player
- Francis William Reitz, politician
- Pieter Rossouw, rugby union player
- Maria Elizabeth Rothmann, writer
- Jimmy Sinclair, cricketer
- Adré Smith, rugby union player
- Hermanus Steyn, former president of the Swellendam Republic
- Francis Sutton, cricketer
- Marius Swart, politician and businessman
- Paul Treu, rugby union player
- Dirkie Uys, Voortrekker hero
- Piet Uys, Voortrekker leader
- Braam du Toit, Composer and Filmmaker
- Fleur van Eeden, stunt performer
- Christia Visser, actress and singer

== Coats of arms ==
Drostdy arms – In 1804, when the Cape Colony was ruled by the Batavian Republic, the government assigned armorial seals to each of the drostdyen, i.e. administrative districts. Swellendam was given the arms of its founder, Hendrik Swellengrebel, namely a golden shield displaying a blue fleur de lis with a red band. An anchor was placed behind the shield. The British authorities discontinued the drostdy seals in 1814, and replaced them with the royal coat of arms.

Municipality (1) – The town of Swellendam established a municipality in 1843. Some time later, the town council decided to adopt the old drostdy arms (although it was not the legal successor to the drostdy). It mistook the fleur de lis for a sheaf of wheat, and thus actually created a new design.

Municipality (2) – In 1929, the town council learned that the Swellengrebel arms actually depicted a fleur de lis and not a sheaf of wheat. It changed the municipal arms accordingly. Both arms were depicted on cigarette cards issued in 1931.

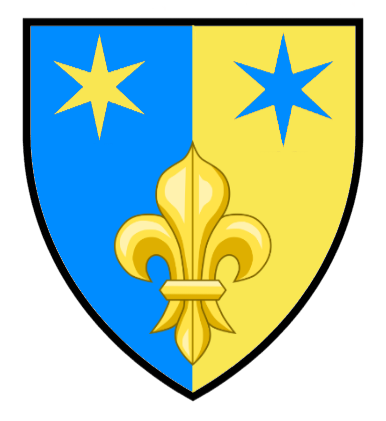
The Swellendam Divisional Council Coat of Arms

Divisional council – The divisional council, i.e. the local authority for the rural areas outside the town, assumed its own coat of arms on 15 November 1974. and registered it at the Bureau of Heraldry in October 1975.

The arms – Per pale Azure and Or, a fleur-de-lis and in chief two mullets of six points counterchanged, i.e. a shield divided vertically into blue and gold, and a fleur de lis below two six-pointed stars – were designed by Cornelis Pama. The crest was an anchor entwined with a grapevine with the motto Lucem spero.
