= Steyn =

Steyn is a Dutch surname.

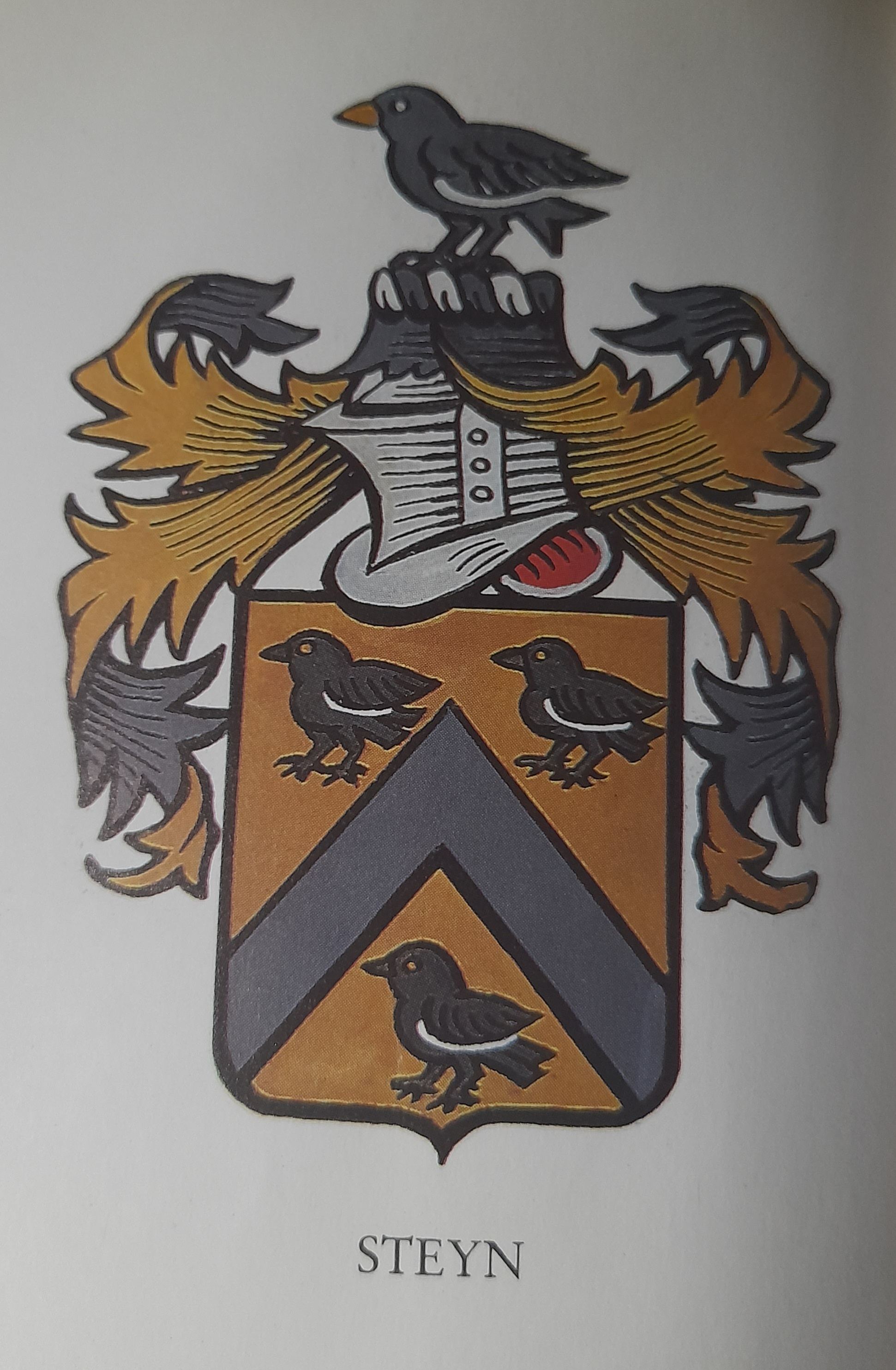

The most common South African progenitor was Douwe Gerbrand Steyn who arrived in South Africa in c. 1672 as a stonemason and married Maria Lozee in 1685. Notable people with the surname include:

- Andrie Steyn, South African cricketer
- Carole Steyn (born 1938), British abstract painter
- Christo Steyn (born 1961), South African tennis player
- Dale Steyn (born 1983), South African cricketer
- Douw Steyn (1952–2025), South African billionaire businessman
- Esme Steyn (born 1953), South African lawn bowls player
- François Steyn (born 1987), South African rugby player
- Gary Steyn (born 1961), Zimbabwean cricketer
- Hermanus Steyn (1743–1804), President of Republic of Swellendam
- Johan Steyn, Baron Steyn (1932–2017), South African jurist
- Karen Steyn (born 1970), British High Court judge
- Lucas Cornelius Steyn (1903–1976), South African politician
- Luke Steyn (born 1993), Zimbabwean alpine skier
- Mark Steyn (born 1959), Canadian journalist
- Martinus Theunis Steyn (1857–1916), South African lawyer, politician, and statesman
- Morné Steyn (born 1984), South African rugby player
- Pieter Steyn (1706–1772), Dutch politician
- Richard Steyn (born 1944), South African newspaper editor, historian and cricketer
- Rudi Steyn (born 1967), South African cricketer
- Santjie Steyn (born 1972), South African lawn bowls player
- Stephen Steyn (1889–1917), South African rugby union player and soldier
- Stephen Steyn (cricketer) (1905–1993), South African cricketer
- Trish Steyn (born 1952), South African lawn bowls player
