= Eeden =

Eeden (often as Van Eeden/van Eeden, or Von Eeden/von Eeden) is a Germanic surname. It may refer to:

- Chris van Eeden (born 1956), West German sprint canoer
- Constance van Eeden (1927–2021), Dutch/Canadian statistician
- Fleur van Eeden (born 1983/1984), South African stunt performer
- Frederik van Eeden (1860–1932), Dutch writer and psychiatrist
- Marcel van Eeden (born 1965), Dutch draftsman and painter
- Marguerite van Eeden, South African actress and photographer
- Trevor Von Eeden (born 1959), American comic book artist and writer

== See also ==
- Van Eeden v Minister of Safety and Security, 2002 South African lawsuit regarding State liability involving prison escapees
