= Cornelis Kick =

Dutch still life painter

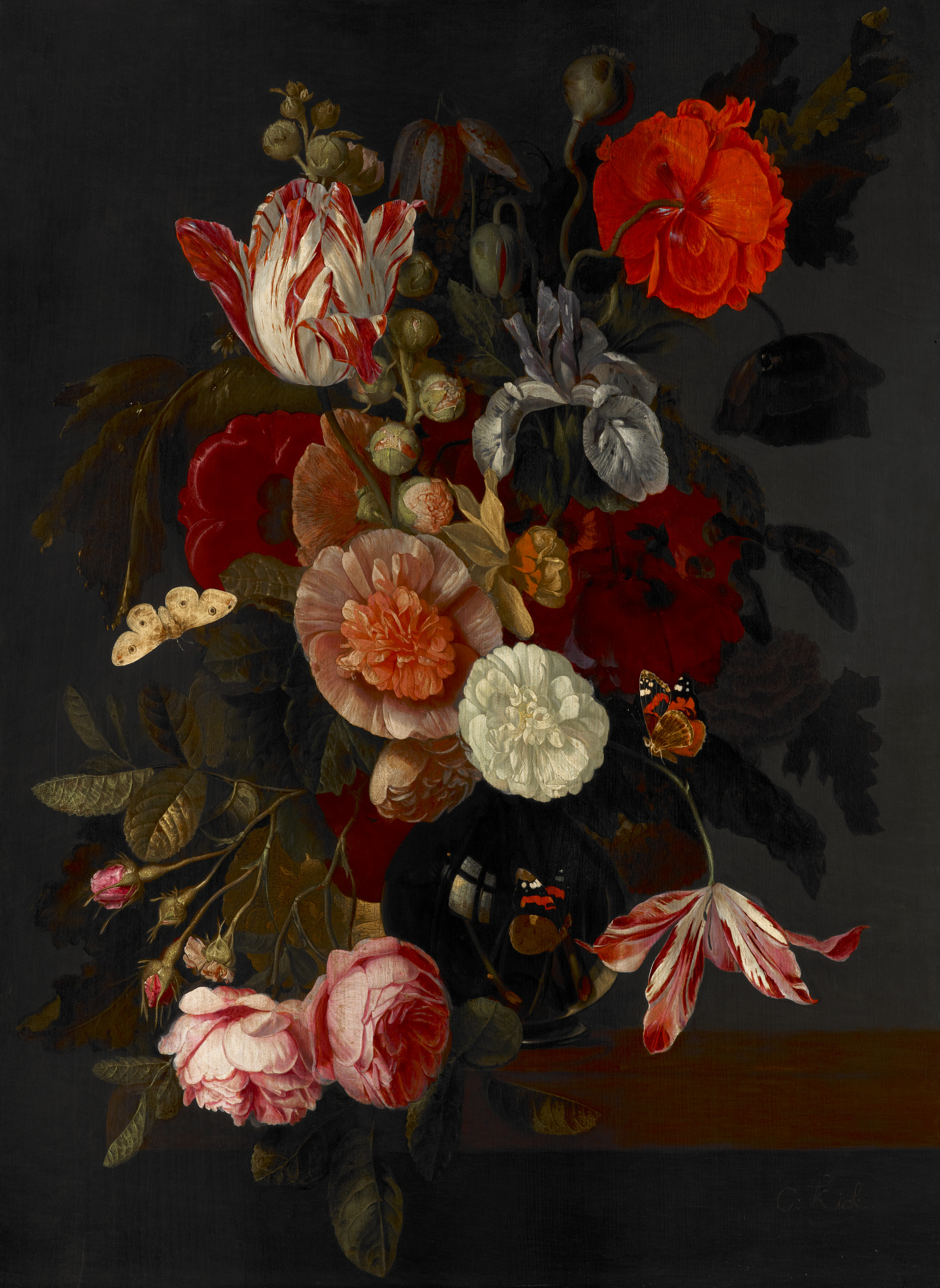
Flowers in a Vase

Cornelis Kick (bapt. 12 March 1634, in Amsterdam – 18 June 1681, in Amsterdam) was a Dutch painter of still lifes and genre scenes. Kick painted still lifes of flower and fruit and sumptuous still lifes. He was also a botanical illustrator.

== Biography ==
Cornelis Kick was born in Amsterdam where he was baptised on 12 March 1634. His parents were Simon Kick (1603-1652), originally from Delft, and Christina Cornelisdr. Duyster (Stijntje Cornelis) (1606 - 1673), from Amsterdam. His mother was the sister of the painter Willem Cornelisz Duyster. From c. 1650 he trained under his father, a painter of genre scenes, portraits including schuttersstukken, landscapes and guardroom scenes (kortegaardjes).

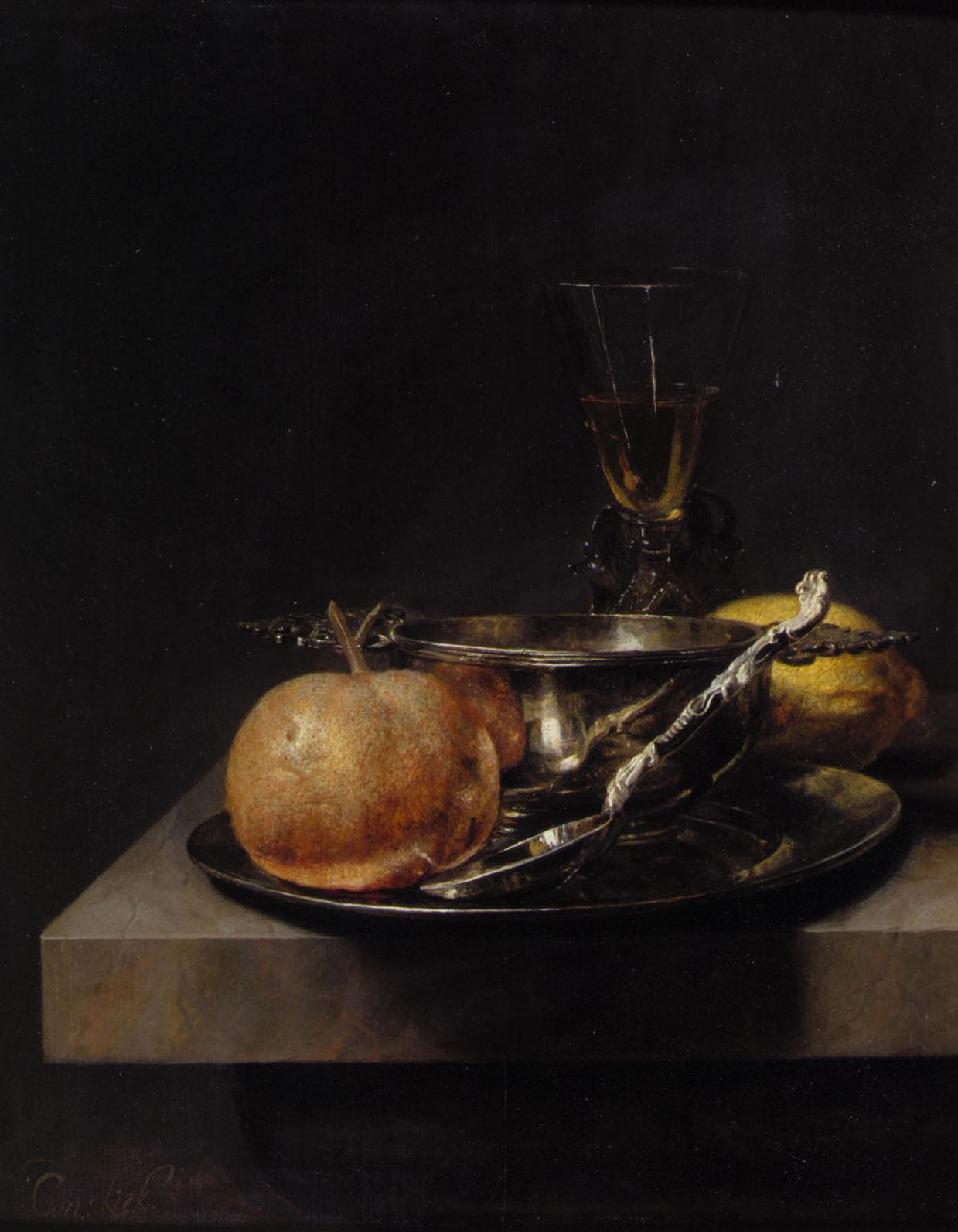
Still life with silver cup

On 5 May 1661 he married Cornelia Spaeroogh, daughter of an affluent pawnbroker of the Bank van Lening. His father-in-law had a garden outside the city walls of Amsterdam beyond the Waag (Weigh house) of Amsterdam. It was here that Kick and his wife went to live between 1667 and 1674. It was here that he painted flowers from nature with his student Jacob van Walscapelle, until the expansion of the city in 1657-1663 claimed the land the garden was on. He was forced to move his garden further eastwards to the new polder called Diemermeer. A daughter from his first marriage, Maria Kick, moved to the Dutch Cape Colony (Now South Africa) where she married Friederich Botha, a German man. Their great grandsons became the Presidents of respectively the Republic of Swellendam and the Republic of Graaff-Reinet in the 1790s.

Between 1667 and 1674 he lived in Loenen aan de Vecht, a small town about 100 km from Amsterdam. After he became a widower, he remarried on 16 December 1674, taking Maghteltje Dirckx of Leiden as his second wife. He returned to live in the city of Amsterdam. In 1676 he is mentioned there as the owner of a shop.

Jacob van Walscapelle and Elias van den Broeck (ca.1652-1708) were his pupils and became respected still life painters.

He died on 18 June 1681 and was buried on 21 June 1681.

== Work ==
Kick painted still lifes of flower and fruit and sumptuous still lifes. There are dated pieces of him from 1667, 1670 and 1675. He was also a botanical illustrator. He only depicts a limited range of flower species in his flower still lifes. He focused on the foliage, which is heavily veined, particularly noticeable on the undersides of the leaves.
