= Jacob van Walscapelle =

Dutch Golden Age flower painter

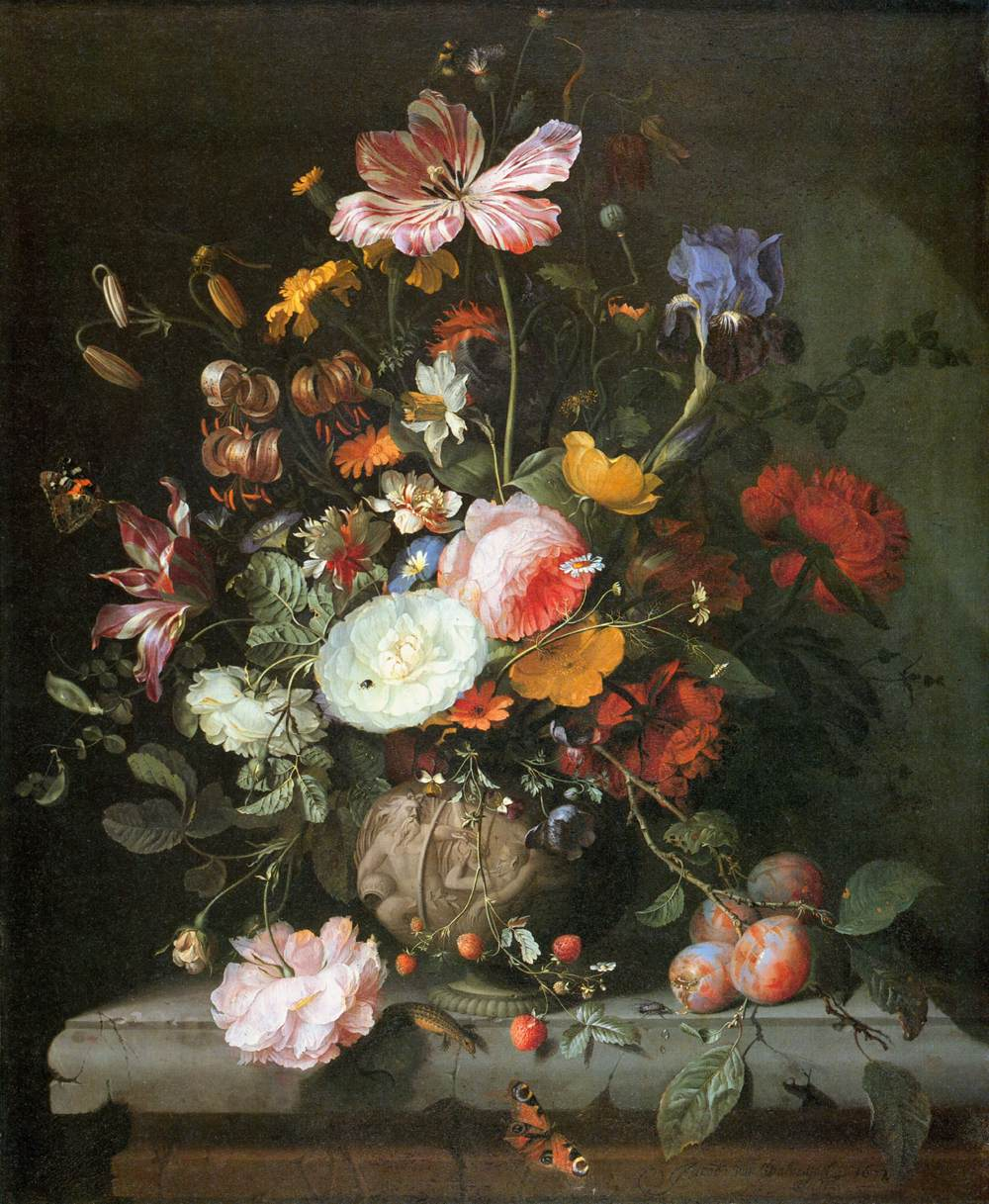
Flowers in a Stone Vase

Jacob van Walscapelle (1644, Dordrecht – 1727, Amsterdam), was a Dutch Golden Age flower painter.

== Biography ==
According to the RKD he was baptized Jacobus Cruydenier, and became a pupil of Cornelis Kick during the years 1664–1667. He painted fruit and flower still lifes in the manner of Jan Davidsz de Heem, and many of his works have been confused with those of Kick. He influenced the painter Michel Nicolas Micheux.

According to Houbraken, his teacher Kick had a garden outside the St Anthony's gate of Amsterdam where he painted flowers from nature with his student Jakob van Walskapel. When the expansion of the city in 1657–1663 claimed the land the garden was on, Kick moved his garden further eastwards to the new polder called Diemermeer. When Kick got it into his head to move to Loenen in 1667 however, Walskapel left his service and moved back to Amsterdam, where he took up another profession and was still living at the time Hourbaken was writing (he was probably Houbraken's source).
