= Francis Sutton =

South African cricketer

Personal information
- Born: 28 June 1879; Swellendam, Cape Colony
- Died: 12 June 1956 (aged 76); Port Elizabeth, South Africa
- Source: Cricinfo, 12 December 2020

Francis Sutton (28 June 1879 – 12 June 1956) was a Cape Colony cricketer. He played in one first-class match for Border in 1902/03.

== See also ==
- List of Border representative cricketers
