= Douwe Steyn =

Douwe Gerbrand Steyn
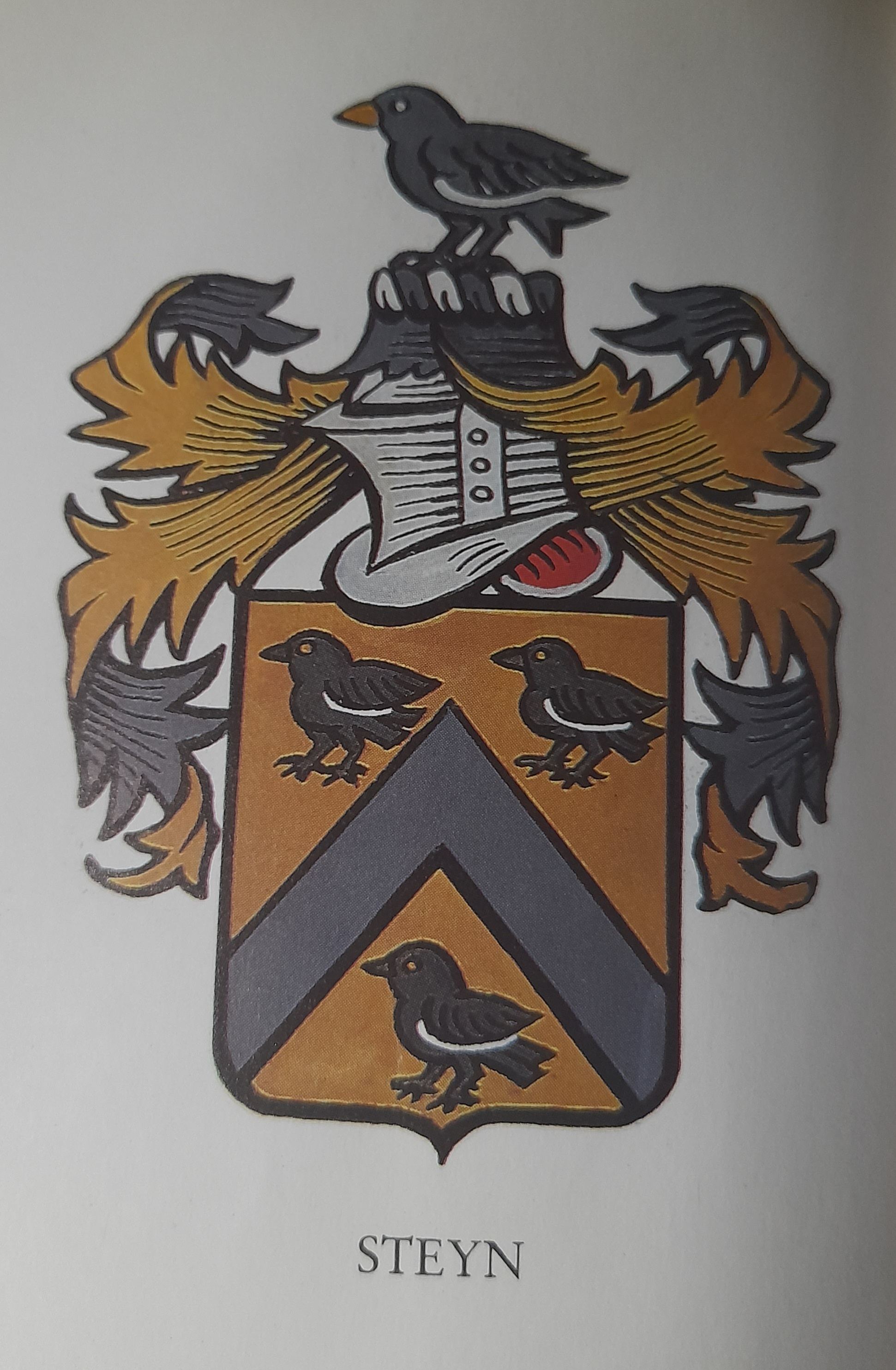
- Steyn Family Crest

City Engineer of Cape Town
- In office 1697 – April 1700
- Governor: Simon van der Stel

Personal details
- Born: 10 July 1631 (Baptism) Leeuwarden, Netherlands
- Died: April 1700 Stellenbosch, Dutch Cape Colony
- Spouse(s): Rikste Egberts (m. 1657-d. 1669); Maria Lozee (m. 1685-1700)
- Relations: Hermanus Steyn; Marthinus Theunis Steyn
- Children: 6 (1 adopted)
- Parent(s): Gerbrand (Gerben) Jacobs; Antje Huigis

Douwe Gerbrand Steyn (bef. 10 July 1631, Leeuwarden– April 1700) was overseer of the Moederkerk, Stellenbosch in 1686 and City Engineer of Cape Town from 1697. He came to the Dutch Cape Colony in 1672 as a stonemason while working for the Dutch East India Company. He is also the progenitor of the Steyn family of South Africa. The book "Die Groot Afrikaanse Familie Naamboek" states that his predecessor as City Engineer of Cape Town was Oldenland when the only Oldenland at the Cape at that time was Henrik Bernard Oldenland, a botanist.

== Progenitor ==
Steyn is widely seen as the progenitor of most of the Steyns of South Africa, although his son, Jacobus, is actually the progenitor. When Steyn came to the Dutch Cape Colony in 1672 as a widower he already had 2 sons, Age (1661–1727) and Gerben (1663–1672), who never came to South Africa. He married Maria Lozee in 1685 when she already had a son named Jacobus, who later took the surname Steyn. Furthermore, Steyn had no more surviving sons. So Jacobus had to have been the progenitor of the Steyn family of South Africa, even though his real father is unknown.
