= Moederkerk, Swellendam =

Church in Swellendam, South Africa

Coordinates: 34.0177°S 20.4464°E

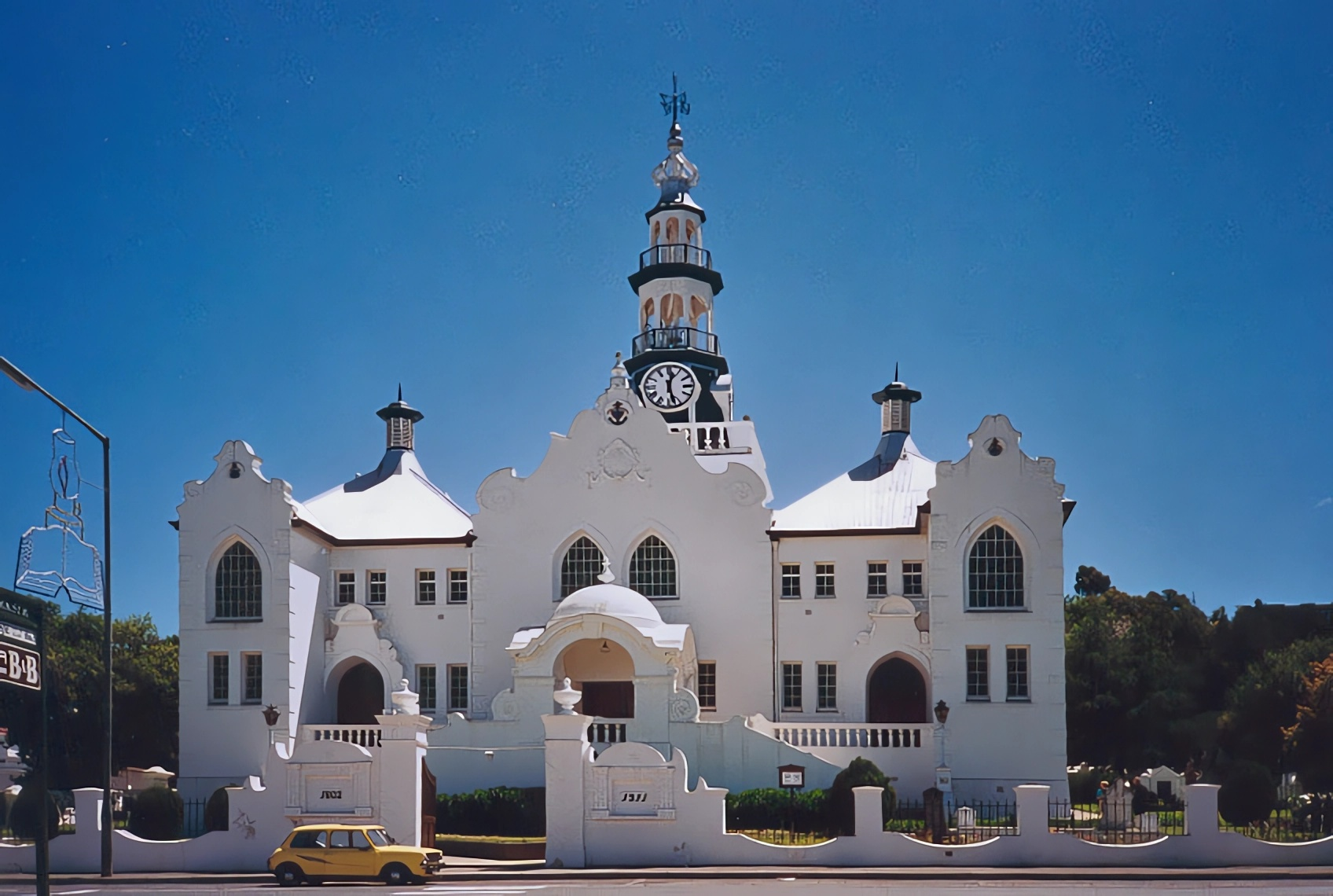
The church in 1998.

The Moederkerk (Mother Church), in Swellendam, South Africa, is the only congregation of the NG Church in the historic Overbergse town of the same name.

The congregation's church building was designed by Folkert Wilko Hesse and his son, Francois. Only 53 years after the proclamation of the district of Swellendam and the establishment of the drosdy and the town at the foot of the Langeberg, the establishment of the municipality of Swellendam in 1798 by the order of the governor during the first English occupation of the Cape, lord George Macartney, took place.

Swellendam, with its rich tradition and interesting past, is the seventh oldest congregation of the NG Church. Within the territory of the original congregation, more than 15 congregations were founded over the years. With the tricentenary celebration in 1952 of the people's planting at the Cape, the congregation geographically covered an area of 50 by 50 miles (80 x 80 km), within which lived 2,650 members and 4,100 souls, with regular church locations in halls and even a church building in the outskirts. Despite the incorporation of Swellendam-Wes into the mother congregation, its membership was 1,184 and its number of souls 1,451.

The first church building was in use from 1802 to 1910, when it was demolished and made way for the new one with its 1,200 seats. It's in 1911, during the service of Rev. A. G. du Toit, initiated. For the first 43 years of its existence, the congregation suffered under a heavy debt load caused by the building of the first church.

Rev. J. H. von Manger was the first of the more than 30 evangelists who served the congregation in addition to quite a few assistant preachers. From 1908, use was made of an assistant pastor and since 1917 the activities were handled by a first and second minister. Since 1944 the congregation has had two co-teachers and between 1948 and 1950 there were three co-teachers.

Dr. William Robertson, after whom the town of Robertson was named, had the longest period of service in the parish, namely 38 years. Rev. DJ Malan was only able to serve the congregation for 10 months before his early death (1905), although his spiritual traces were still discernible decades later.

Times of extraordinary spiritual blessings and revivals characterize the congregation's history and have contributed much to its rich past. In 1948, the 150-year anniversary of the congregation was festively celebrated and its history summarized in a commemorative book under the heading One and a half Century of Mercy.

== Ministers ==
- Johan Heinrich von Manger 1798–1802
- Hendrik Willem Ballot, 1802–1803
- Johannes Augustus Schutz, 1803–1813
- Jan Christoffel Berrange, 1815–1816
- Johannes Spijker, 1817–1823
- Cornelius Moll, 1823–1832
- William Robertson, 1834–1872
- Johannes Rynard Keet, 1859–1864
- Christoffel Frederic Jacobus Muller, 1872–1877
- George Murray,1879–1892
- Joachim Hermanus van Wyk, 1892–1896
- Daniël Stephanus Botha, 1898–1904
- David Johannes Malan, 1905
- Andreas Gerhardus du Toit, 1906–1919
- Stefanus Frederik Kloppers, 1907–1915
- George David du Toit, 1917–1925
- Arthur William Eckard, 1921–1929
- Pieter Kuypers Albertyn, 1926–1930
- Irenee Emilé Heyns, 1936–1939
- Pieter Francois de Vos Muller, 1940–1942
- Pieter Gideon Wiid, 1942–1947
- Jacobus Stephanus Gericke, 1944–1946
- Willem Adolph Alheit, 1947–1951
- Johannes Visser, 1952–1958
- Christoffel Johannes Bester, 1948–1955
- Willem Jacobus Gerhardus Lubbe, 1956–1960
- Johannes Jacobus Mulder Raubenheimer, 1960–1961
- Johannes Paulus Olivier Pienaar, 1961–1982
- Philippus Johannes Petrus Hugo, 1962–1967
- Gerhardus Francois Janse van Rensburg, 1968–1972
- Jacobus Sybrand Pieterse, 1968–1974
- Almo Johann Zietsman, 1975–1986
- George Johan Retief, 1982–1985
- Daniel Johannes De Kock, 1986
- Hendrik Pieter Basson, 1986–2004
- Gert Olivier Muller, 1992–2010
- Christiaan Coenraad Van der Merwe, 2005–2014
- Gabriël Jacobus Gouws, 2014–present

== Sources ==
- (in Dutch) Maeder, ds. G.A. en Zinn, Christian. 1917. Ons Kerk Album. Kaapstad: Ons Kerk Album Maatschappij Bpkt.
- (in Afrikaans) Olivier, ds. P.L. (samesteller), 1952. Ons gemeentelike feesalbum. Kaapstad en Pretoria: N.G. Kerk-uitgewers.
