= Fleur van Eeden =

- Born: 1983 or 1984 (age 40–41); Swellendam, South Africa
- Occupation: Stunt performer
- Years active: 2004 – present

Fleur van Eeden is a South African stunt performer who has been active since 2004. She was born in Swellendam in 1983/1984.

== Background ==
In her youth, van Eeden became involved with the game of tug of war and eventually became the youngest puller on South Africa's Senior Women's team for the World Championships. She last participated in the championships in 2004 and began work as a river guide. One of her clients was Franz Spilhaus, who invited her to work for his stunts company and involved her as a stunt performer for the 2005 miniseries The Triangle. In her first year, van Eeden worked on the films Primeval, Flood, Opération Rainbow Warrior, The Bird Can't Fly, Bible Code, and Drona. She said Doomsday had the biggest impact on her with its intensity.

Van Eeden has worked mainly on films that are shot in Cape Town, South Africa. In the 2010s, she has worked as stunt performer on the films Date Night, Dredd, and Mad Max: Fury Road.
