= Streicher =

Streicher is a German surname. Notable people with the surname include:

- Agatha Streicher, German physician
- Henri Streicher (1863–1952), French archbishop
- Herbert Streicher, stage name Harry Reems (1947–2013), American pornographic actor
- Johann Andreas Streicher, German piano maker and composer
- Nannette Streicher (1769–1833), German piano maker and composer
- Johann Baptist Streicher (1796–1871), Austrian piano maker
- Julius Streicher (1885–1946), German publicist and politician
- Lyubov Streicher (1888–1958), Russian composer
- Ludwig Streicher (1920–2003), Austrian musician
- Michael Streicher (1921–2006(, American metallurgist
- Mike Streicher (1957–2019), American racing driver
- Myburgh Streicher (1928–2005), South African politician
- Piet Streicher (born 1944), South African judge
- Rikki Streicher (1922–1994), LGBTQ bar owner and activist
- Rudolf Streicher, Former Austrian politician
- Sarah Streicher, American screenwriter and playwright
- Thomas Streicher (1958–2025), Austrian mathematician
