= Hermanus Steyn =

Boer political leader, President of the Republic of Swellendam

President Hermanus Steyn
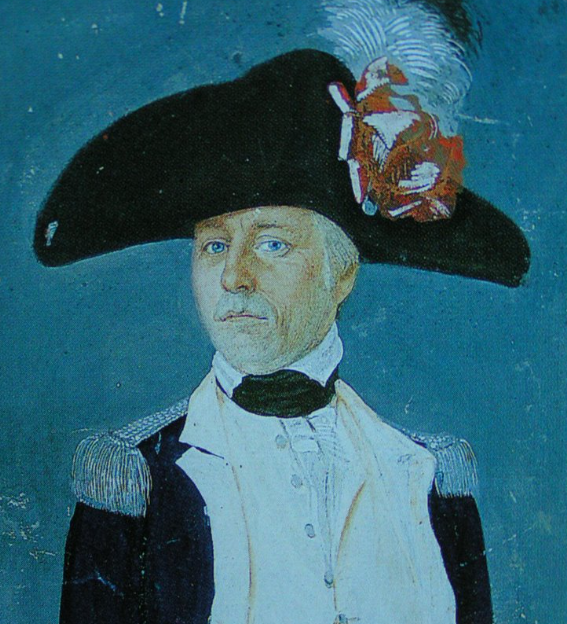
- President Hermanus Steyn

President of the Republic of Swellendam
- In office 17 June 1795 – 4 November 1795
- Vice President: Petrus Delport
- Preceded by: Office established
- Succeeded by: Office abolished

Head of Swellendam Home Council
- Preceded by: Hermanus Steyn d'Oude

Personal details
- Born: 15 February 1743 Bruintjiesrivier, Swellendam, Dutch Cape Colony
- Died: 1804 (aged 60–61) Jan Harmsgat, Swellendam, Cape Colony
- Spouse: Anna Margaretha Van Staden (m. 1765)
- Children: 7
- Parent(s): Hermanus Steyn d'Oude and Martha Potgieter

Military service
- Allegiance: Republic of Swellendam; Republic of Graaff-Reinet

Hermanus Steyn (15 February 1743, Swellendam – 1804, Swellendam) was a Boer political leader and the President of the short-lived Republic of Swellendam. When the rule of the Dutch East India Company fell in 1795 and the Swellendam citizens called their own Republic into existence, he was elected as president. A few months after the arrival of the British, an end was made to this Republic.

== Biography ==
He was born and baptized in 1743 near Bruintjies River, which was then the border of the Dutch Cape Colony. He married Anna Margaretha Van Staden in 1765. They had seven children together - three sons and four daughters. He farmed with his father, Hermanus Steyn d'Oude at Bruintjiesfontein near Swellendam until 1773, where he soon commanded respect from his neighbours. His father was elected as part of the home council of Swellendam various times. He was very interested in the Patriot movement at the Cape in the years 1770. In 1773 he moved to the tenant farm De Doornfontein "boven aan de Sondags Rivier onder de Camdeboo" on the then eastern border. In 1789 he returned to Swellendam and settled on the farm Jan Harmansgat. He lived there until he died in 1806. His son Marthinus farmed after him on Jan Harmansgat. Simon Kick, the famous Dutch Painter, was his 3rd great-grandfather on his mother's side, Hendrik Potgieter, the Voortrekker, was his cousin's son, also on his mother's side and Marthinus Prinsloo, the President of the Republic of Graaff-Reinet was his 2nd cousin, also on his mother's side.

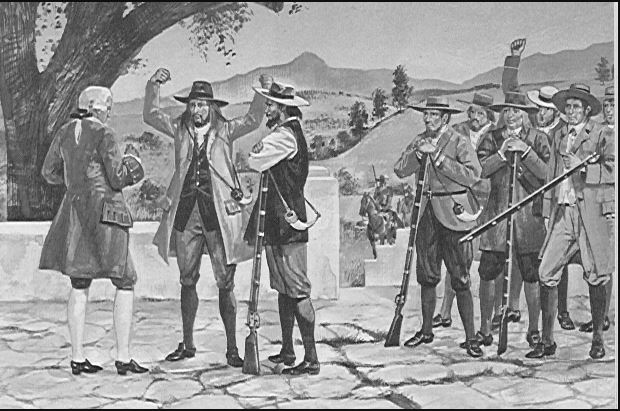
Declaration of the Republic of Swellendam.

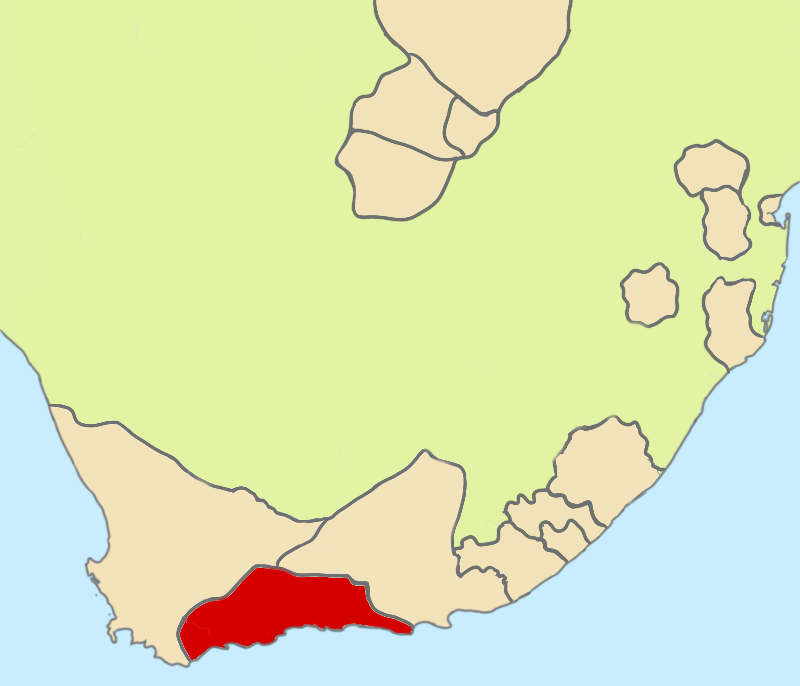
The Republic of Swellendam in 1795.

== Ancestry ==
Ancestry of Hermanus Steyn

1. Hermanus Steyn d'Jonge

  - 2. Hermanus Steyn d'Oude
    - 4. Jacob Steyn
      - 8. Douwe Steyn
        - 16. Gerben Jacobs
        - 17. Antje Huigis
      - 9. Maria Lozee
        - 18. Johannes Coon
        - 19. Maria Van Angola
    - 5. Maria Potgieter
      - 10. Harmen Jansz Potgieter
        - 20. Jan Hermann Potgieter
        - 21. Schwenne Van Lodden
      - 11. Isabella Fredericks
  - 3. Martha Potgieter
    - 6. Hans Jurgen Potgieter
      - 12. Harmen Jansz Potgieter (nr. 10)
      - 13. Isabella Fredericks (nr. 11)
    - 7. Cornelia Botha
      - 14. Friedrich Botha
        - 28. Micheal Both
        - 29. Susanna Elisabeth Saulus
      - 15. Maria Kickers
        - 30. Cornelis Kick
          - 60. Simon Kick
          - 61. Christina Cornelia Duyster
        - 31. Cornelia Spaeroogh
