= Van Eeden v Minister of Safety & Security =

South African legal case

In Van Eeden v. Minister of Safety and Security (Women's Legal Centre Trust, as Amicus Curiae), an important case in the South African of law of delict as well as the country's criminal law, the appellant, Ghia Van Eeden, was assaulted, raped, and robbed by a known, dangerous criminal who had escaped from police custody. The court held that the state was obliged to protect individuals by taking active steps to prevent violations of the constitutional right to freedom and security of the person, inter alia by protecting everyone from violent crime. It was also obliged under international law to protect women specifically from violent crime.

In light of these imperatives, the court could no longer support the requirement of a special relationship between the plaintiff and the defendant for the imposition of a legal duty; it held that the police have a duty to protect the public in general from known dangerous criminals in their custody.

== See also ==
- South African criminal law
- South African law of delict

Further Reading:

== Sources ==
- Van Eeden v Minister of Safety and Security (Women's Legal Centre Trust, as Amicus Curiae) 2003 (1) SA 389 (SCA). Case 176/2001, South African Legal Information Institute.
