= Gary Steyn =

Zimbabwean cricketer (born 1961)

Personal information
- Full name: Gary Vivian Steyn
- Born: 10 March 1961 (age 65); Umtali, Manicaland, Southern Rhodesia
- Batting: Right-handed
- Bowling: Slow left-arm orthodox

Domestic team information
- Years: Team
- 1994/95: Mashonaland Country Districts

Career statistics
Competition	FC
Matches	2
Runs scored	44
Batting average	14.66
100s/50s	0/0
Top score	21*
Balls bowled	126
Wickets	0
Bowling average	–
5 wickets in innings	–
10 wickets in match	–
Best bowling	–
Catches/stumpings	2/–
- Source: ESPNcricinfo, 15 July 2021

Gary Vivian Steyn (born 10 March 1961) is a former Zimbabwean cricketer. Born in Umtali (now Mutare), Manicaland, he played one first-class match for Mashonaland Country Districts during the 1994–95 Logan Cup.
