= Republic of Graaff-Reinet =

Boer republic in Southern Africa (1795–1796)

The Republic of Graaff-Reinet De Republiek Graaff-Reynet (Dutch)
- 1795–1796
- Flag Coat of arms

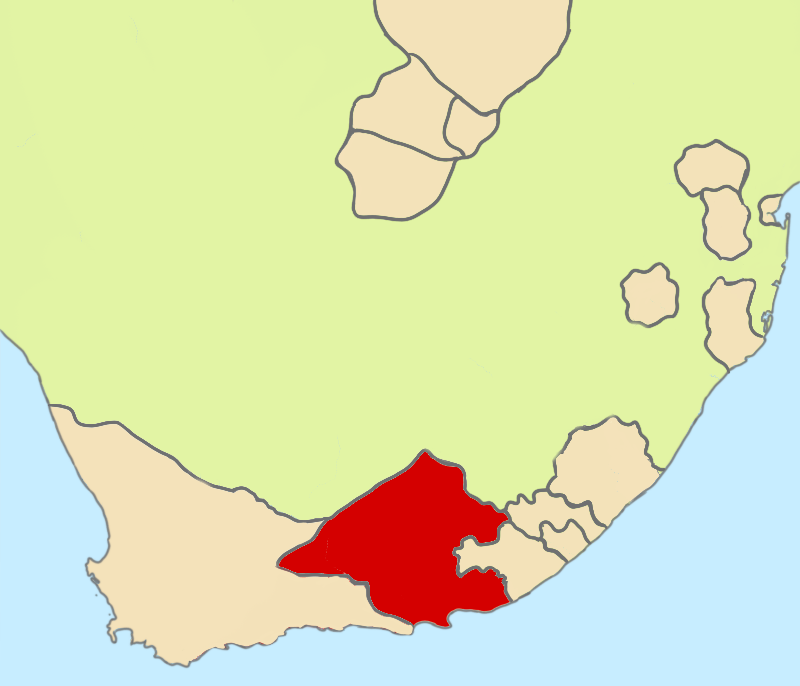
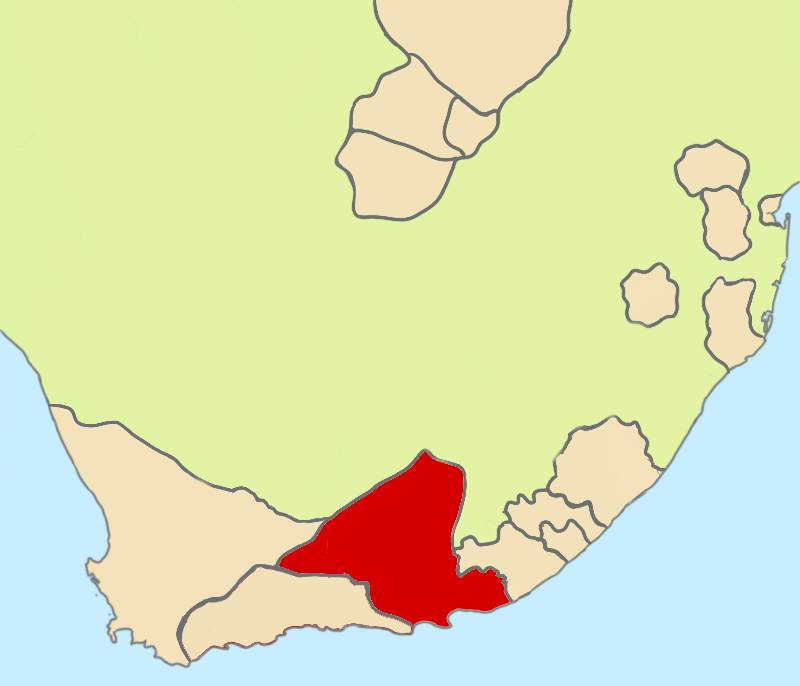
- Capital: Graaff-Reinet

Government
  - President: Marthinus Prinsloo

Independence from the Dutch Republic and the Dutch East India Company
- History
  - Revolt Against the Dutch East India Company: 1795
  - British Invasion of the Cape: 1796
Preceded by	Succeeded by
Dutch Cape Colony; Republic of Swellendam	Cape Colony
- Today part of: South Africa

The Republic of Graaff-Reinet (Afrikaans: [ˌχrɑːf.rəˈnɛt]) was from 1795 to 1796 a self-proclaimed Boer republic that existed in and around the city of Graaff-Reinet in present-day South Africa. It was named after Cornelis Jacob van de Graaff and his wife, Cornelia Reynet.

== History ==
In the 18th century, the first mounted commandos of the Boer settlers reached the area where Graaff-Reinet currently lies. They moved east from the Cape Colony. The first farms were established in the 1770s. In the first years there was anarchy and lawlessness in the area. After a new magistrate was sent to the region to maintain law and order, the peaceful development of the settlement could begin. In 1795, after years of oppression by the Dutch East India Company (VOC), the inhabitants proclaimed a republic. The residents of Swellendam also did this (see map). Before the leaders of the Cape Colony could retake the new republics, the Cape Colony (together with the two rebellious areas) was itself conquered by Great Britain in 1795 (and Graaff-Reinet until August 1796). After the Batavian Republic regained the Cape Colony from the British, it was finally taken over by the British in 1806. Many inhabitants of the colony were very dissatisfied with this. For this reason, especially many people from the Graaff-Reinet district participated in the Great Trek.

== Gallery ==
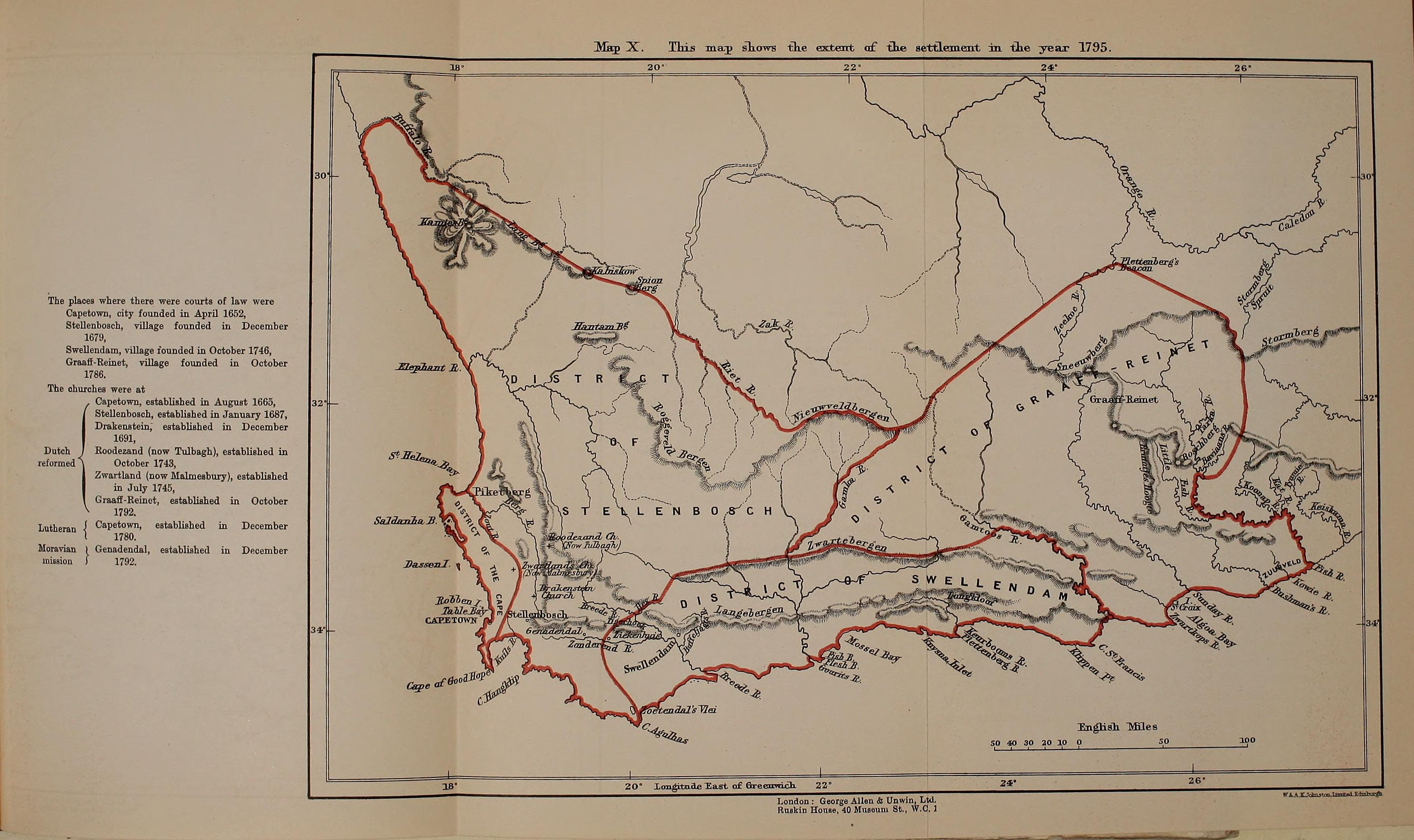
Map of the Dutch Cape Colony in 1795.
