= Republic of Swellendam =

Short-lived Boer Republic in Southern Africa (1795)

The Republic of Swellendam Het Republiek Van Swellendam (Dutch)
- 17 June 1795–November 1795
- Flag Coat of arms

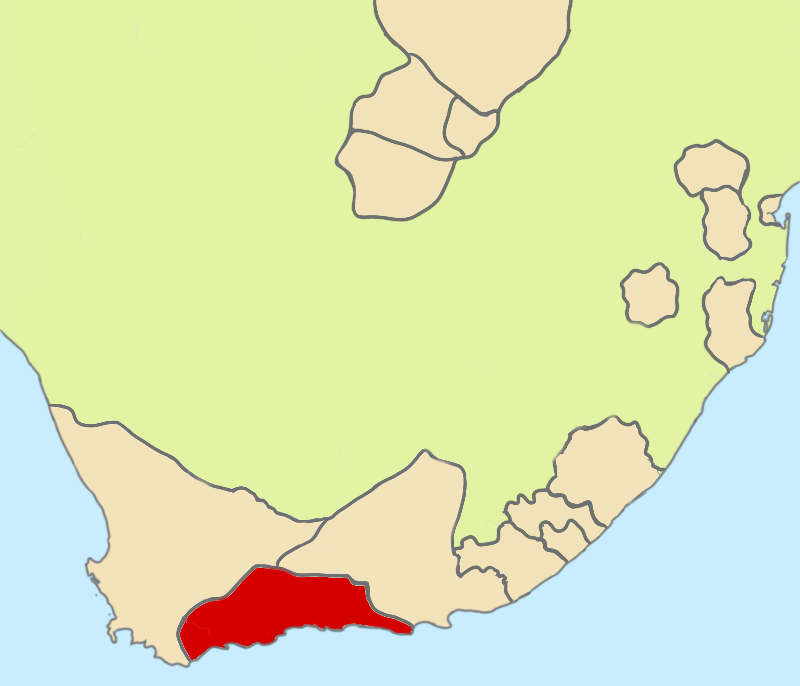
- Republic of Swellendam, as shown in red.
- Capital and largest city: Swellendam; 34°01′23″S 20°26′24″E
- Demonyms: Swellendammer (None officially)
- Government: Republic
  - President: Hermanus Steyn
  - National Commander: Petrus Delport
  - Head of National Board: Jacobus Steyn

Independence from the Netherlands
- History
  - Revolt against the Dutch: April 1795
  - Republic Declared: 17 June 1795
  - British Invasion of the Cape Colony: November 1795

Area
  - Total: 27,258 km^{2} (10,524 sq mi)
Preceded by	Succeeded by
Dutch Cape Colony	Cape Colony; Republic of Graaff-Reinet
- Today part of: South Africa (Western Cape and Eastern Cape)

The Republic of Swellendam was founded in 1795 when dissatisfaction towards the Dutch East India Company caused the burghers of Swellendam to revolt, and on 17 June 1795 they declared themselves a republic. Hermanus Steyn was appointed as President of the Republic of Swellendam. The burghers of Swellendam started to call themselves "national burghers" – after the style of the French Revolution. However, the Republic was short-lived and was ended on 4 November 1795 when the Cape was occupied by the Kingdom of Great Britain.

== History ==
The Republic of Swellendam came into existence when on 17 and 18 June 1795, around sixty Cape citizens under the leadership of Petrus Delport occupied the drostdy and forced the magistrate of Swellendam, Anthonie Faure and his officials to resign. Hermanus Steyn d'Jonge was then elected president. The incident took place a few months after Marthinus Prinsloo established an acting government in the Colony of Graaff-Reinet on 4 February 1795. The rebellion and self-government was motivated by unhappiness with tax payments to the company and the ban on the registration of Khoikhoi children on farms. Although a national magistrate was appointed and the national convention served as government, the government was recognized in the Free Republic of the Netherlands and there was no intention to establish a republic.

== Gallery ==
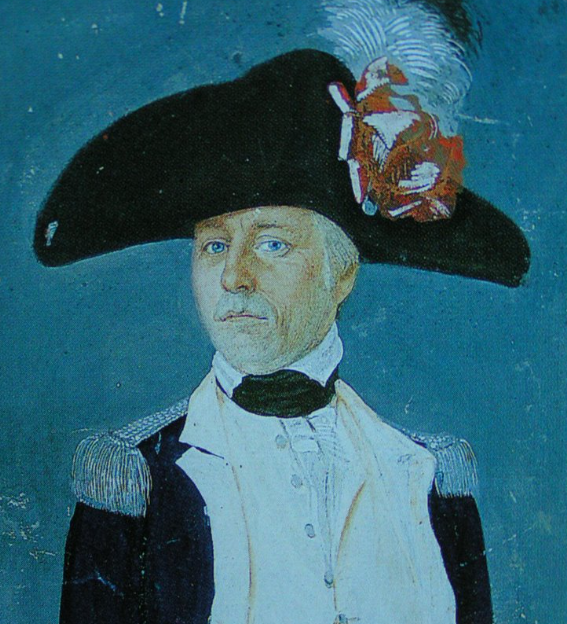
President Hermanus Steyn

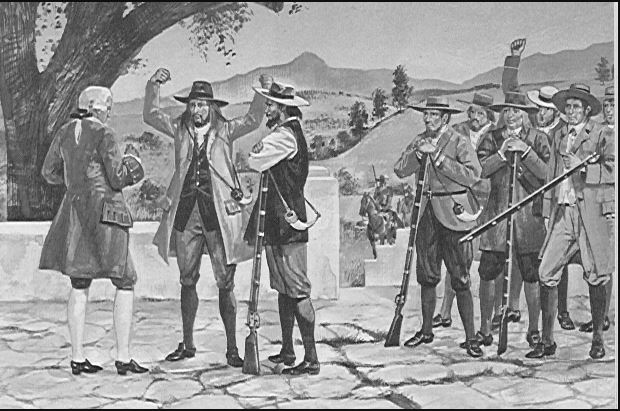
Declaration of the Republic of Swellendam in 1795

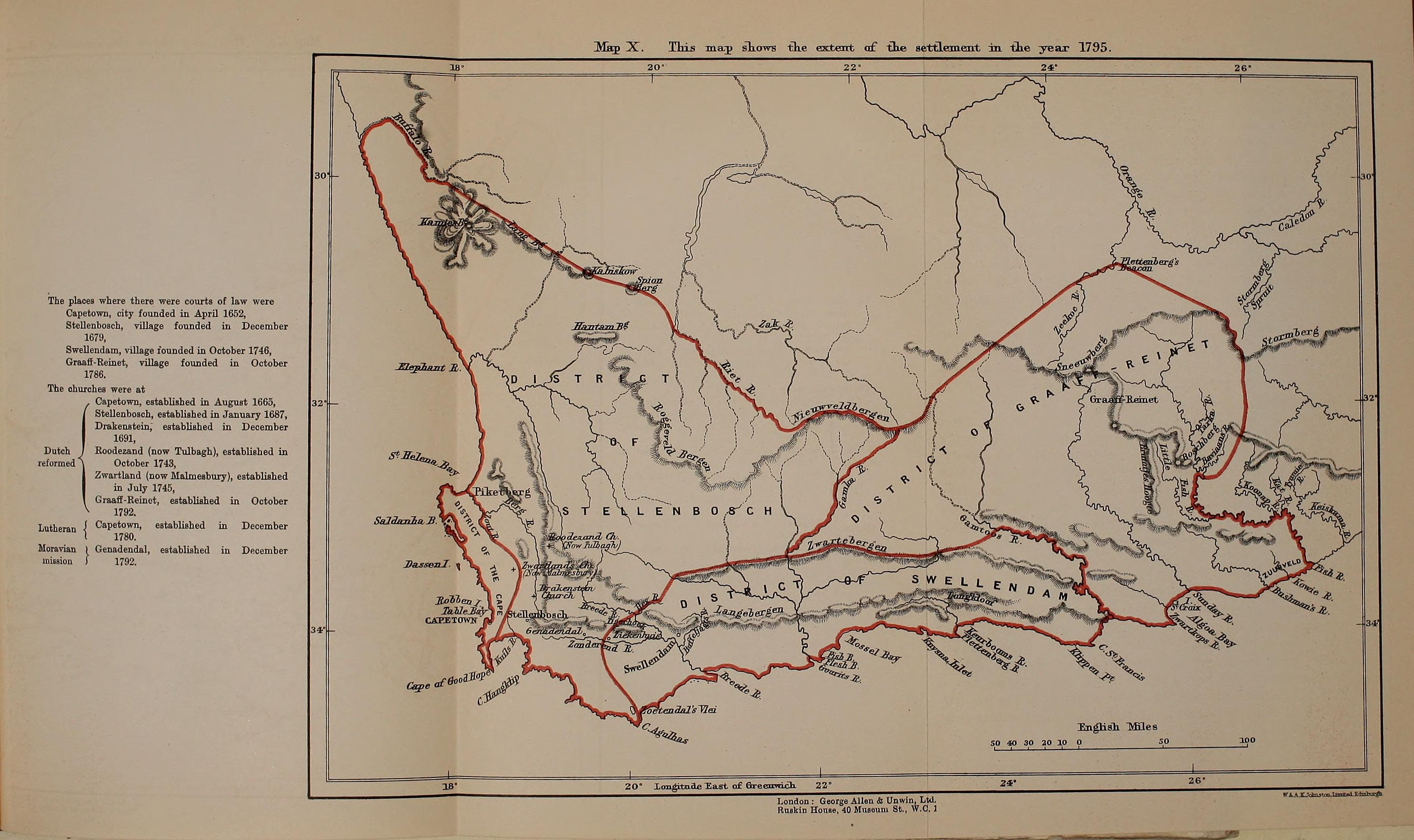
Map of the Dutch Cape Colony in 1795.

== See also ==
- Republic of Graaff-Reinet
- Boer republics
- Cape Independence
- Cape Republic
