= Jacobus Philippus Snyman =

Boer general during the Second Boer War

Jacobus Philippus Snyman Hamerkop
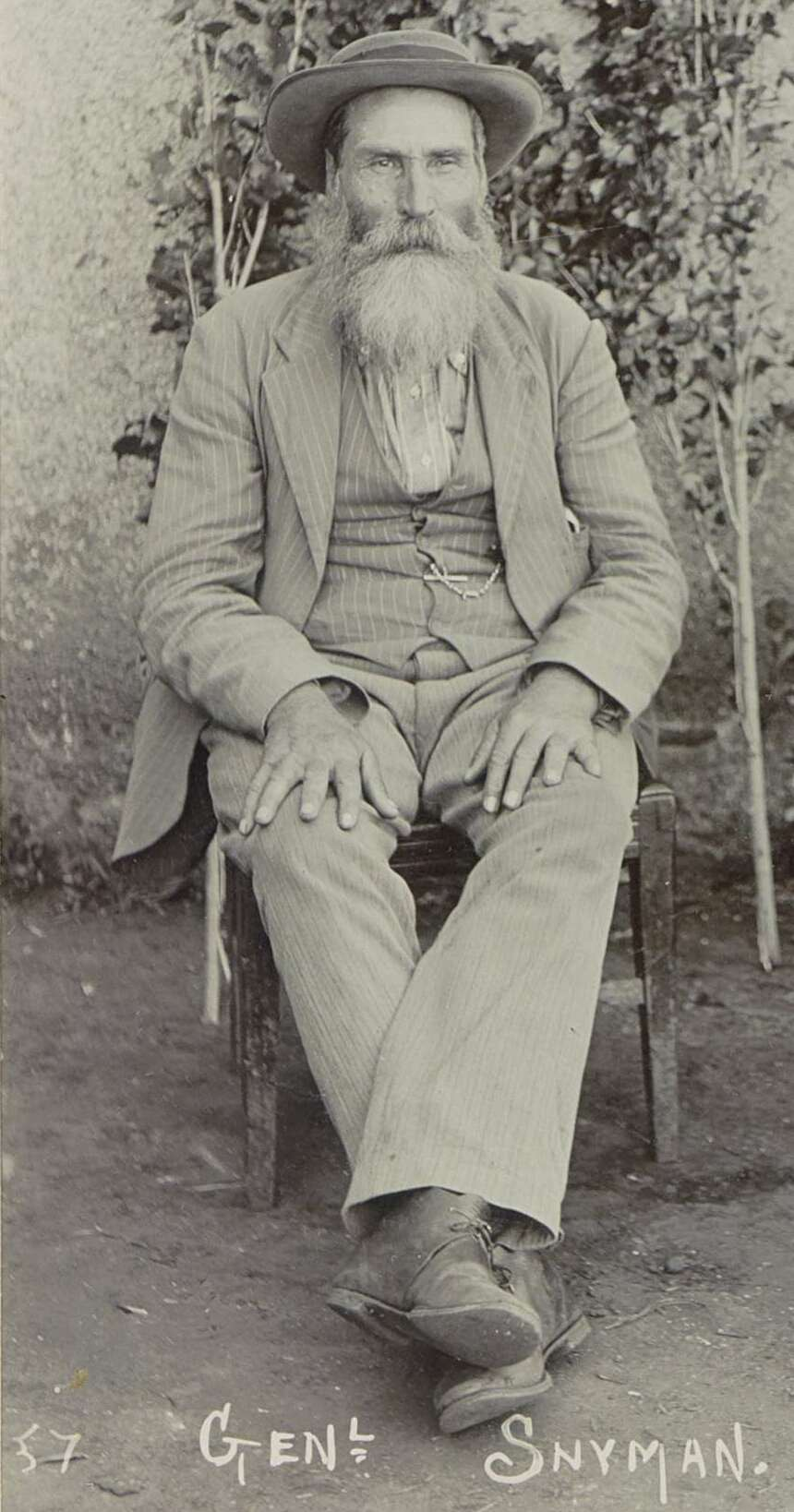
- Born: 29 January 1838; During the Great Trek
- Died: 19 December 1925 (aged 87); Doornhoek, Groot Marico, Transvaal, Union of South Africa
- Military career
- Allegiance: South African Republic
- Branch: Transvaal Army
- Service years: 1880 – 1902
- Rank: General
- Nickname: Hamerkop
- Unit: Western Transvaal
- Commands: Marico and Rustenburg
- Conflicts: First Anglo-Boer War; Second Mapoch War; Jameson Raid; Second Anglo-Boer War; Siege of Mafeking; Battle of Diamond Hill
- Other work: Native Commissioner & District Commissioner of the Marico

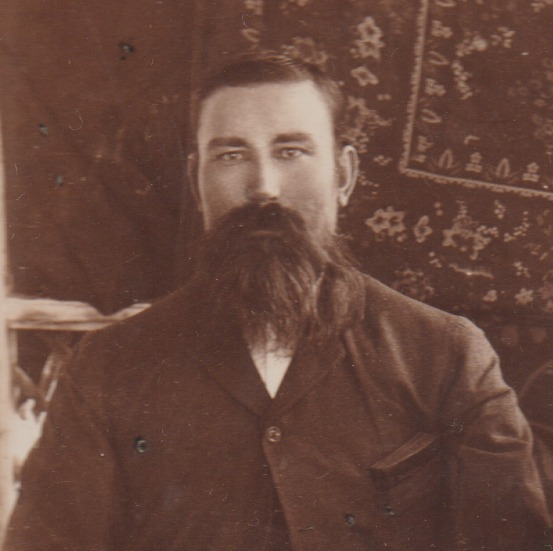
Kootjie "Hamerkop" Snyman at a younger age.

General Jacobus Philippus Snyman (Afrikaans pronunciation: [ˈsnəiman]; Kootjie "Hamerkop" Snyman, 29 January 1838 – 19 December 1925) was one of the dominant military figures in the South African Republic (or Transvaal) during the 19th century. He was the District Commissioner, Native Commissioner, and Commandant for the Marico district and led the Rustenburg and Marico commandos during the Second Boer War. Nicknamed Hamerkop, Snyman came to international prominence as the military commander at the Siege of Mafeking from November 1899 to May 1900.

== Early life and family ==
Born in Uitenhage during the Great Trek, General Snyman was a young boy when his family trekked from the Cape Colony to Natal, eventually settling in the Marico district of the Western Transvaal. He was the son of Jacobus Philippus Snyman Sr. and Johanna Marthina Bekker.

General Snyman's parents lived in Uitenhage with his maternal grandfather, Johannes Jurgen Bekker, a deeply religious man and leader of the Jerusalemgangers movement. The two families joined the Great Trek under the leadership of J.A. Enslin and made their way to Natal where they arrived in 1838. General Snyman's father and father-in-law (Matthys Gerhardus Potgieter 1794–1868) participated in the Battle of Bloodriver. It was Evert Frederik Potgieter (1799–1863), brother of General Snyman's father-in-law, who found and verified the signed treaty (The deed of cession of the Tugela-Umzimvubu region) located in Piet Retief's pocket following the delegation's massacre by the Zulu king, Dingane. The family eventually settled in the Marico district in the Transvaal, but not before participating in the Battle of Boomplaats in 1848 where they tried, unsuccessfully to drive the British out of the Free State after Britain had annexed the Orange River Sovereignty to the British Crown.

General Snyman's father was a farmer in the Marico district, a pioneer hunter, a leader of the Jerusalemgangers movement in the Marico and one of three leaders of the 'hunter's faction' of the Transvaal Republic. Some time before David Livingstone reached the Victoria Falls, the famous falls were also reached from the South by General Snyman's father and the well-known Commandant Jan Viljoen, whose hunting ground it became. In August 1852, General Snyman's father informed the Transvaal Government that Sechele, ruler of the Bakwêna of Botswana, had received gunpowder, lead and muskets from the missionary David Livingstone. In addition, General Snyman's father held successful negotiations with Sechele in November 1852 and was a signatory to the Peace Treaty at Mathebe between the South African Republic and Chief Montshiwa of the Barolong Boo Ratshidi, on 14 October 1853. This is the Peace Treaty referred to by Theal in his History of South Africa 1834-1854, p525.

As a young man General Snyman was a professional hunter. He tanned the hides and traded them for sheep which he had purchased in the Free State. He was a successful farmer and known for his breeding of carriage horses that won 1st prize at the annual Agricultural Show.

General Snyman's father, together with Commandant Jan Viljoen, had shown support to Stephanus Schoeman during the Transvaal Civil War, when the Volksraad declared Schoeman's following a rebel faction. This allowed Paul Kruger to summon his burghers to the conflict. Kruger, who was elected commandant-general in April 1863, succeeded in driving Schoeman over the Vaal River. Commandant Jan Viljoen took over the leadership of Schoeman's faction and tried to restore their position by force of arms. Commandant Jan Viljoen led a so-called 'People's Army' against Kruger and his 'State Army' in January 1864, but was defeated at the Crocodile River. Negotiations held at the Crocodile River in January 1864 ended the Transvaal Civil War. General Snyman's mother, Johanna Marthina Bekker, was the niece of Stephanus Schoeman's stepmother.

In 1901 Snyman owned well over eight hundred head of cattle and five thousand sheep. This did not include the holdings of his sons, who worked a large group of farms located near Snyman's stead. He died on 19 December 1925 at the age of 87 on his farm Witrand in the Marico district.

== Marriage ==
On 6 August 1858 at the Nederduitsch Hervormde Kerk at Potchefstroom, Snyman married Dirkie Elizabeth Aletta Potgieter (1840 - 1905) and settled on Witrand, the Snyman family farm. They had ten children. She was the daughter of Matthys Gerhardus Potgieter, a prominent member of the Boer community who served as Heemraad and member of the Natalia Republic Volksraad at Pietermaritzburg. On 12 January 1906 General Snyman married Lydia Magdalena Fouché and on 17 September 1907 he married Helena Jacoba Catharina Pienaar.

== Gereformeerde Kerk ==
General Snyman's family were initially members of the Nederduitsch Hervormde Kerk rather than the Gereformeerde Kerk to which Paul Kruger belonged. The Nederduitsch Hervormde Kerk was the only Dutch church in the vicinity of Rustenburg at the time, founded in 1850 by the Dutch-speaking Voortrekkers who moved into the area due to relative peace and fewer attacks from the native population. Rev. Dirk Van der Hoff was their Minister. The disaffected then made efforts to receive a Minister from the Reformed Church (Gereformeerde Kerk in Afrikaans) in the Netherlands that remained true to the teachings as established at the Synod of Dordrecht. In answer to the request, Rev. Dirk Postma Sr. was sent to South Africa by the church in the Netherlands. He arrived at the end of 1858 and was initially recognized by the Nederduitsch Hervormde Kerk as a Minister of the Rustenburg congregation.

On 10 January 1859, it was decided at a general church meeting in Pretoria that in addition to the book of Psalms the Nederduitsch Hervormde Kerk would recognize and allow the singing of additional Hymns not found in the book of Psalms. With this decision, Rev. Postma Sr. and many who were of the same opinion, could not reconcile and with a letter dated 11 January the aforementioned withdrew from the church community of the Nederduitsche Hervormde Kerk and established the Gereformeerde Kerk in accordance with the teachings revealed at the Synod of Dordrecht in the years 1618 and 1619. It was then decided to hold a general meeting on 10 February 1859 where the new Church was established.

The following month, the Rev. Dirk Postma Sr. visited the Marico district where he was hosted by General Snyman's father. It was during this visit that the Snyman family became members of the Gereformeerde Kerk at Rustenburg and would continue to serve as members and ordained officials of the community helping to establish new congregations in Namibia, Angola and throughout South Africa. General Snyman was ordained Deacon in 1893, serving as a church elder (Ouderling in Afrikaans) and Deacon for more than 32 years. The western wards of the Gereformeerde Kerk of Rustenburg, the oldest congregation in South Africa, were formed into the Marico congregation on Saturday 26 May 1899 under the chairmanship of Rev. Dirk Postma Jr. at the opening of the new church building. As church elder of the Rustenburg congregation General Snyman was re-elected to the position for the Marico congregation where he provided the sum of £700 for the construction of the main church building located at Zeerust. The building was expropriated by the British during the Second Boer War. After the war £500 was paid in war reparations to the congregation.

== The Hamerkop Mine ==
The first base metal mining operation in the South African Republic was the Hamerkop mine in the Marico, which was worked as early as 1866 for the extraction of Lead used in the manufacture of ammunition. It was situated near the head of the Great Marico River, near Jacobsdal on the Klein Marico, on the farm Doornhoek that belonged to General Snyman. These ore deposits were commonly called 'Lead mines' due to the fact that the Silver bearing Galena attracted the most attention. Aubert, the French consul-general at Pretoria, reported that the Galena from the Marico district returned more than 500 grams (18 ounces) of Silver per ton.

== The Barolong ==
On 15 November 1870, a conference aimed at an agreement on the issue of land boundaries was held on the border near Mafeking at a place called Buurmansdrift attended by General Snyman, Marthinus Wessel Pretorius, Paul Kruger, Hendrik Adriaan Greeff and five other representatives of the South African Republic and the Batswana Chiefs represented by Montshiwa of the Ratshidi Barolong, Moroka of the Seleka Barolong, Izaak Motlhabane, Makgobi of the Maebu Barolong, Phoi and Matlaba of the Rapulana Barolong, Moilwa of the Bahurutshe at Marico, Maiketso of the Batlhaping, Gaseitsiwe of the BaNgwaketse at Kanye, and Andries Rey the representative of David Massouw (Mosweu) of the Koranna at Mamusa.

The Barolong people were led by Tau's sons, two of whom were to become much involved in the race for paramountcy in Bechuanaland. Their names were Montshiwa of the Barolong Boo Ratshidi and Moswete of the Barolong Boo Ratlou. Moswete had been driven off land in the Molopo River region and was bitter with the British about the land he had lost when Governor Robert William Keate designated some of it to be part of Griqualand West in the Keate Award of 1871. Moswete saw a Transvaal deal as an opportunity to kill two birds with one stone and awarded the contentious Molopo land to the South African Republic.

Montshiwa thereupon appealed to the British government for help and protection. None was forthcoming, but in 1877 when Theophilus Shepstone - on behalf of the Crown - annexed the Transvaal, Montshiwa took sides with the British, for which he was to be taught a lesson by the Boers in 1881. Following the end of the First Boer War, the Pretoria Convention of August 1881 set up a Border Commission with power to fix boundaries, including boundaries in the Transvaal / Bechuanaland region. Moswete became impatient at what he considered to be procrastination on the part of the commission and he decided to make a pre-emptive strike to remove Montshiwa's people from territory he, Moswete, claimed for his people. Moswete enlisted Transvaal mercenaries to spearhead the attack. The reward for the mercenaries was to be half the booty which was captured together with grants of land. Montshiwa appealed again for help from the British government, but apart from totally ineffective appeals to the Transvaal to get the mercenaries out of Montshiwa's territory, when the British complained about the occupation of Montshiwa's lands as a breach of the provisions of the Pretoria Convention, the Transvaal took the position that they had no control over, nor could they be expected to control, the mercenaries. Montshiwa fought as best he could, but his warriors were no match for the mercenaries and by October 1882, he had to make peace. He called in the local Transvaal official, General Snyman, for assistance. Snyman settled the terms of peace between Moswete and Montshiwa and both chiefs signed the document. Both had put their lands under the protection of the South African Republic.

As Commandant of the Marico district and Native Commissioner, Snyman commanded the Boers in battles led against Montshiwa (1882-1884). He was responsible for resolving tribal conflicts that arose between the factions on the Western Transvaal frontier and the South African Republic. Most notable was the role Snyman played in negotiating peace between the South African Republic, Moswete of the Barolong Boo Ratlou and Montshiwa of the Barolong Boo Ratshidi on 24 October 1882. This agreement was known as the Snyman Peace Treaty.

The settlement expropriated a sizeable portion of Montshiwa's land, compelling him to pay a war indemnity of £16,000. In addition, the land taken by conquest from Montshiwa, together with the land taken as a reward from Moswete, was formed into a Republic named the Land of Goshen, with Nicolaas Claudius Gey van Pittius as its Administrator.

== State of Goshen ==
In the Snyman Peace Treaty of 1882, General Snyman proclaimed the boundaries of the Land of Goshen, a Boer republic that opposed British rule in the region. Chief Montshiwa, a British ally, was allotted ten farms of 30,000 morgen each, without prejudice to Chief Moswete, and had to vacate the area. Independence was declared (followed by an official proclamation on 21 November 1882), naming the new nation after the Book of Genesis's Land of Goshen, "the best of the land of Egypt given to Joseph", with its capital at Rooigrond.

The State of Goshen had an estimated population of 17,000, of whom approximately 2,000 were of European origin, and covered an area of 10,400 km^{2} (4,015 sq mi). The State unified with the neighbouring Republic of Stellaland and became known as the United States of Stellaland (Dutch: Verenigde Staten van Stellaland) from 1883 to 1885.

The land became a focal point of conflict between the British Empire and the South African Republic, the two major players vying over the territory. After a series of claims and annexations, British fears of Boer expansionism ultimately led to its demise and, among other factors, set the stage for the Second Boer War of 1899–1902.

== The Bahurutshe ==
In 1887 General Snyman was granted permission to enter into an agreement with Chief Ikalafeng of the Bahurutshe to obtain mineral rights in the chief's portion of the reserve. President Paul Kruger provided his personal assurance that in the event of minerals being discovered Ikalafeng would only lose access to the limited area of the actual find. Ikalafeng and his Council signed the agreement and in 1891 a new contract was signed increasing the annual payment to £500 a year and transferring all the rights and privileges of the previous contract to the Transvalia Land Exploration and Mining Company, who then took over payment.

The Bahurutshe under Suping were impeded from successfully resettling by a prolonged negotiation over what land they should occupy and on what basis it should be settled. Initially they were given half of a government farm, Hartebeestfontein 195, on which to settle. In 1888 Suping requested that this farm, together with an adjoining farm, Vinkrivier, owned by Snyman, be granted to him as a location. Snyman supported the request and the government gave Chief Suping the offer of purchasing the farm from Snyman. The final transfer occurred in 1894.

Several Hurutshe assisted the Boers in the early stages of the Anglo Boer War. One of Snyman's last acts as Native Commissioner before departing was to call up 40 Hurutshe men who were to report to the landdrost at Lichtenburg to guard and work on the farms of burghers in arms. More men were called up over the following six months, mainly to safeguard farms.

== First Boer War ==
At Paardekraal on 15 December 1880, General Snyman served as Acting-Commandant at a sitting of the Transvaal War Council. Snyman departed Paardekraal in the commando of 400 horsemen under General Piet Cronje. The commando went to Potchefstroom to have the freedom proclamation printed. At the same time, the printing press had to be protected against a possible British attack.

At Mooi Rivier (Potchefstroom), Snyman received his appointment as Commandant of the Zeerust commando (Marico district) and the following day, on 16 December, Heidelberg was secured and proclaimed as the temporary capital of the restored Transvaal Republic. The Transvaal flag was hoisted in the town and the proclamation declaring the restoration was read out. The same day, the first shots of the First War of Independence were fired at Potchefstroom.

On 31 December 1880, Snyman participated as Commandant at the court-martial of Corporal Johannes van der Linde and Christiaan Woite who were found guilty and sentenced to death for high treason. The guilty parties had passed on critical information about the War Council held at Paardekraal to Commandant P. Raaff of the British Volunteer Force.

The war ended and peace was established with the signing of the Pretoria Convention by the Transvaal and British Governments in October 1881. The Transvaal Government invested General Snyman with the authority and resources to enforce the Treaty.

On 27 December 1884, General Snyman in his capacity as Commissioner, informed the Transvaal Government that Koos de la Rey was appointed Vice-Commissioner of the Lichtenburg district.

On 25 July 1885, General Snyman proposed to the Transvaal Legislature (Volksraad in Afrikaans) that Koos de la Rey be appointed Commandant and Native Commissioner of the Lichtenburg district. De la Rey was appointed to the position in 1885.

== The Second Mapoch War ==
General Snyman participated in the war between Nyabela, chief of the Ndzundza faction of the Ndebele tribe, and the South African Republic (1882–1883). Nyabela was the leader of the Ndzundza-Ndebele and his mountain fortress, KoNomtjarhelo (Mapochstad), was built by his father Mabhogo (Mapoch). For years, the renegade Mampuru of the Bapedi had been engaged in a power struggle with his half-brother, Sekhukhune. In mid-1882, some of Mampuru's followers attacked Chief Sekhukhune's kraal and murdered him. On two previous occasions, the Transvaal authorities had attempted to arrest him for fomenting disorder, and this latest outrage was the last straw. Mampuru and his supporters sought refuge with Makwani, one of Nyabela's subordinate chiefs. When ordered to extradite the fugitive, Nyabela decided not to do so, giving credence to rumours that he and Mampuru were jointly plotting to coordinate a general uprising of native communities in the Transvaal against the South African Republic.

On 12 October 1882, the Transvaal Volksraad authorised General Piet Joubert to raise a commando. Within two weeks of the commencement of hostilities in November 1882, the KwaPondo bastion (called 'Vlugkraal' by the Boers) located in the Mapoch's Caves became the center of the war. General Piet Joubert arrived with three cannon and a considerable amount of dynamite from Pretoria to help reduce the defenses. On 17 November 1882, a fort was erected no more than two thousand paces away from the Ndebele stronghold. While a second fort was being built near the first, the Ndebele attempted to drive back the besieging force, but were themselves beaten off when the Rustenburg Commando attacked the stronghold through the cave system of the KwaPondo bastion. After two and a half hours of fierce fighting Nyabela lost some forty men and the Republican forces numbered one killed and six wounded. Snyman was one of those wounded in the battle. Soon after this repulse, Nyabela sent out his emissaries to discuss peace terms with General Joubert.

== The Jameson Raid ==
In December 1895, General Snyman informed the Volksraad that the Chartered Company requested that Chiefs Sechele, Montshiwa, Bathoen of the Ngwaketse, Keuning, Gaborone and Khama invade the Marico district and thereby draw the burgher forces there. On 29 December 1895 Leander Starr Jameson, the Administrator General of the Chartered Company (of which Cecil Rhodes was the chairman) for Matabeleland, brought together a force of around 600 men, about 400 from the Matabeleland Mounted Police and the remainder other volunteers.

In an interview given by Snyman in 1897 he stated that Jameson's plan failed because the two men sent to Zeerust on that famous Sunday evening did not cut the telegraph wires, saying, 'If those two men had cut the wires, Jameson would have won his case'. On 5 January 1896 Snyman sent a telegram informing Commandant-General Joubert in Pretoria of the Chartered Company's plan to overthrow the Transvaal Republic. Snyman provided detailed instructions that were found in a book belonging to the Chartered Company.

== The Snyman Fence ==
On 20 January 1882, Commandant-General Piet Joubert, invested Snyman with the authority to uphold and enforce the proclamation dated 20 October 1881 between the South African Republic and the British Empire, known as the Pretoria Convention. He was instructed to secure the borders if necessary by force without respect of persons, and to order the field cornets to direct their burghers to keep themselves in readiness, and to continually patrol the borders, and to watch and take care that no armed persons pass backwards or forwards over the line, and to immediately disarm such persons and disperse them. Also to take possession of all booty cattle and property until receipt of further orders from the Government, and to make regular reports to the Government on all such matters.

Following the failed Jameson Raid, Snyman was mandated with securing the borders of the South African Republic. In his capacity as District Commissioner, Native Commissioner and Chairman of the Rinderpest committee, his role was to secure the border between the Republic and the Bechuanaland Protectorate from invasion, wildlife carrying disease and cross-border stock theft.

On 23 July 1896, Snyman proposed to the Volksraad legislature the construction of a border-fence to decrease the number of border guards and protect livestock from wildlife infected with rinderpest. On 27 July the Volksraad voted for the construction of the border-fence and it became known as The Snyman Fence. The border-fence was erected across the districts of Marico, Rustenburg, Waterberg and the Soutpansberg at an initial cost of £26 000. Sections of the original border-fence continue to stand today as the territorial border between the Republic of South Africa and Botswana.

== Second Boer War ==
=== General ===
Snyman was 61 years of age and an experienced military commander when the Second Boer War began. He began the war as Commandant of the Zeerust commando, and was promoted to General of the Rustenburg and Marico burghers. Captain Reichmann, the United States attaché with the Boer forces, confirmed that Snyman began the war with 984 burghers under his command in the Marico commando (also known as the Zeerust commando).

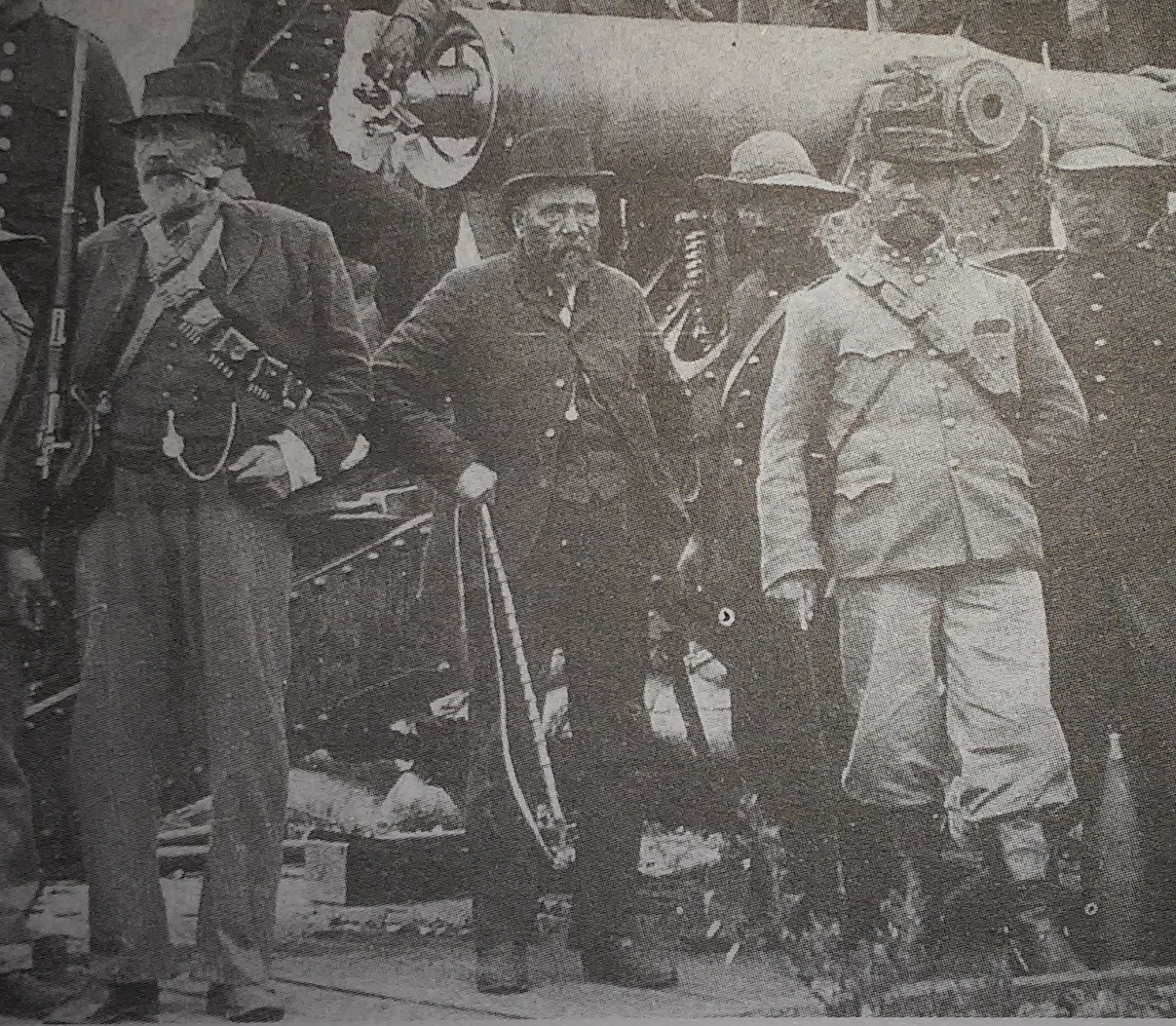
Assistant-General J.P. Snyman with General Piet Cronje and Captain of the Transvaal State-Artillery, P.J. van der Merwe

On 11 October 1899 the South African Republic declared war against the British Empire, and immediately the troops of the Transvaal and the Orange Free State entered the Cape Colony and Natal. The same day General Piet Cronje appointed Snyman to the position of Combat-General. Snyman disabled the telegraph and railway lines north of Mafeking. In Mafeking, Colonel Baden-Powell with 2000 men were checked by General Snyman. Two hundred and fifty miles to the south, on the western border of the Free State, Kimberley was besieged by a large army under General Piet Cronje. Almost all the British forces in South Africa were thus in the course of three weeks helplessly imprisoned with the Boer forces strongly entrenched on British territory.

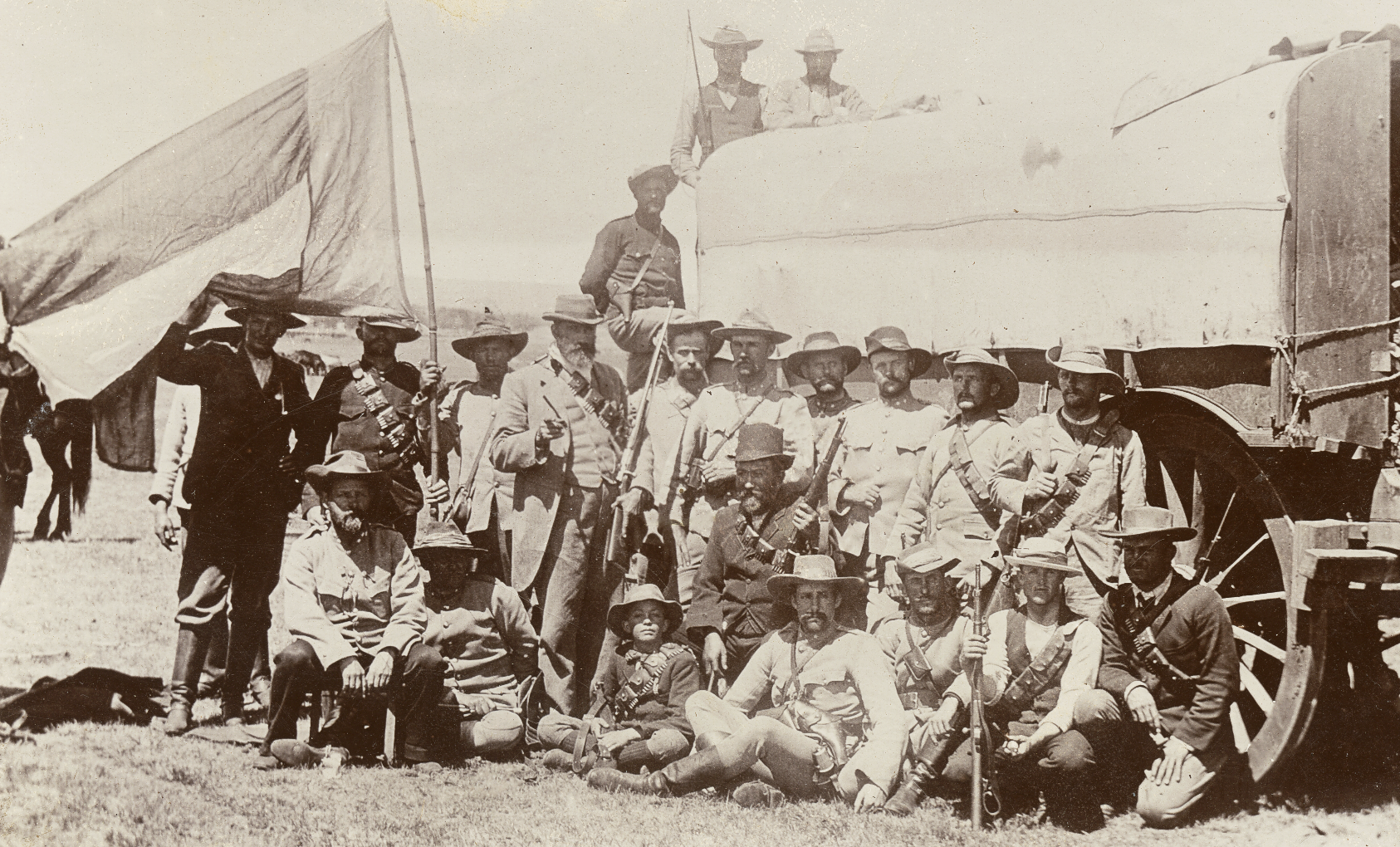
General J.P. Snyman with the Transvaal State-Artillery and Lt-Col. S. P. E. Trichard at the Siege of Mafeking

=== Trap at the Mafeking rail track ===
On 13 October a locomotive pushed two railway trucks loaded with 22 tons of dynamite approximately 14 km north of Mafeking, uncoupled and steamed back. Baden-Powell planned to detonate the dynamite when inquisitive burghers crowded around the abandoned trucks. General Snyman however suspected a trap and ordered his men to open fire at the carriages causing a massive explosion. The explosion damaged the northbound track much more effectively than the burghers would have been able to do with hand-tools and small charges. Nobody was injured in the blast but the incident reinforced rumours that the British garrison had buried hundreds of remote-controlled dynamite mines around the town.

=== Capture of an armoured train ===
The following day, 14 October, General Snyman with 200 mounted burghers attacked Captain Lord Charles Cavendish-Bentinck's cavalry squadron and an armoured train located north of Mafeking. General Snyman had taken up position 2 miles south of the spot where the dynamite blast had taken place a day earlier, on a ridge east of the railroad tracks. This ridge extends for an hour in the shape of a crescent from east to west, with the bend facing Mafeking. Between the west side of the Boer position and the town were two native kraals where the troops of Baden-Powell had nested, while the guns of the armoured train, at a distance of 300 yards, swarmed the Boers, firing shots into the flank.

The train was in constant motion, steaming forwards and backwards with the intention of giving the Boers an uncertain target. The crew of the leading truck consisted of a detachment of the British South African Police and Railway Volunteers under Captain Ashley Williams. The truck was armed with a Maxim and the crew were armed with Lee-Metford rifles. The second truck was also armed with a Maxim and the third truck carried a Hotchkiss gun. The Transvalers had a difficult position here and were almost without cover, but they held on, fearless, firing with speed. At this point nine relatives, including five of General Snyman's sons, were together.

At this time fresh cavalry advanced with cannon from Mafeking and disappeared behind a camp of thorn trees to the south-west of the Boer position and aimed their cannon at General Snyman's position. The fight was now getting serious. The cannonballs smashed in front and behind the Boer positions, kicking up long streaks of dust from the earth to the right and left, but the two Maxim guns of the Boers were brought to this point and did a good job. The fighting was fierce and Colonel Baden-Powell dispatched a squadron of the Bechuanaland Protectorate Regiment under Captain Charles FitzClarence to cover the train's retreat. General Snyman lured the squadron into an ambush that prohibited Captain FitzClarence from retreating on account of the number of his wounded. The Boers had a splendid position, and the armoured train dared not shoot at the Kraal for fear of hitting their own troops. So the cavalry master was ordered to retreat to Mafeking with his hard-pressed cavalry, but he needed reinforcements to take his wounded with him. Then Captain Bentinck and his squadron came to his aid; the train took the seriously wounded, and at a quarter to twelve the retreat had commenced. Lord Bentinck managed to cover Captain FitzClarence's escape with the assistance of the armoured train. The British numbered 2 killed (Corporal J. Pharland and Trooper N.J. Walsh) and 16 wounded (including Captain Bentinck and Lieutenant Brady). The burghers numbered 1 killed and 6 wounded. Commandant Josephus Daniel Lourens Botha of the Marico commando fought under General Snyman.

=== Destroying the railway line, occupying Lobatse and fighting at Gaborone ===
On the 18th General Snyman left Mafeking and traveled northwards destroying the railway line at several points, making contact with Commandant Pieter D. Swart at Lobatse on the 20th.

On the 23rd Commandant-General Piet Joubert sent a telegram to President Paul Kruger explaining that the Marico burghers had taken Lobatse, and General Snyman fights now and then at Gaborone and elsewhere before succeeding General Cronje at Mafeking. Close to Gaborone in the far north there were 400 burghers, and at Derdepoort, the entrance to Rustenburg, there were another 300 men.

=== Destroying the Crocodile Pools bridge ===
On 24 October as General Snyman blew up the railway bridge of the Cape Railway at the narrow pass south of the Crocodile Pools (on the border of Transvaal with the Bechuanaland Protectorate, south-west of Gaborone), his advanced patrols made contact with the armored train H.M. Powerful under Captain Hoel Llewellyn (Police Commandant of advance armored trains) and a contingent of the British South African Police. At a distance of 6 miles from the destroyed bridge the train started firing on the burghers, but when Captain Llewellyn discovered that the burghers did not flee, and had big guns at their disposal, he thought it prudent after a short skirmish to retreat. General Snyman continued to destroy the Bulawayo railway line. As a result, the arrival of General Snyman on the scene halted the H.M. Powerful and other armored trains' ability to attack the northwestern border of the Transvaal.

=== Commanding the Siege of Mafeking ===
On 17 November, General Cronje received instruction from State Secretary W.J. Leyds that the command of the siege be handed over to General Snyman and that he collect all the burghers from the districts under his command, including as many of the men involved in the siege as could be spared without preventing the continuation of the siege, and stop the northwards march of British forces at Kimberley. Command was handed over on Cronje's departure the following day on 18 November. General Snyman was left with 1,400 men of which only 1,300 men were at their posts whereas the British garrison under the command of Colonel Baden-Powell numbered approximately 1,300 men, including 300 armed Africans. The civilian population totaled about 6,500 including 5,000 Barolong in the black township. At the same time, General Snyman had to hold off Colonel Herbert Plumer, who tried to attack Mafeking from the north with 900 British soldiers. General Snyman had to secure the border from native-led attacks and invasions. In addition, he had to ensure that livestock and crops were maintained and collected by giving his men leave to do so. Due to the fact that the majority of these commandos had been tasked with patrols north of Mafeking at Crocodile Pools, Gaborone and Derdepoort, General Snyman made a request to the State President for a burgher contingent from Potchefstroom to be allocated to the siege at Mafeking as the burghers from Rustenburg and Marico who had remained were insufficient to continue the siege.

Derdepoort was an important defensive/offensive point on the border between the South African Republic and the Buchuanaland Protectorate, important for its close proximity to Mochudi, the capital of the baKgatla tribe and 37 km from Gaborone, which was on the main railway line connecting Cape Town to Bulawayo. General Cronje instructed Field Cornet Piet Kruger and his between 500 and 600 mounted burghers to travel south with him, leaving Derdepoort vulnerable to attack.

General Snyman, with a few hundred burghers from the Marico district, crossed the border at Crocodile Pools on 24 November 1899, blew up the bridge, and awaited the arrival of the trains, about whose movements he was accurately informed by Dutch missionaries in Khama's country. General Snyman surprised the trains in a well-orchestrated ambush, and, after exchanging a few shots with the Boer guns, the British officers in charge of the Bulawayo force steamed back to the north. Linchwe, Chief of the baKgatla tribe, was astounded at the refusal of the British soldiers to fight Snyman, and at the retreat of the armored trains. The baKgatla had raided Transvaal cattle under the instigation of the British Chartered Company's officials, and the Boers were now showing themselves able to drive back both the British and the native forces with ease.

=== Derdepoort Massacre ===
The following day, on 25 November 500 British-armed baKgatla warriors accompanied by British forces commanded by Lieutenant-Colonel G.L. Holdsworth, attacked a Boer laager at Derdepoort where they killed approximately 20 civilians, looting and kidnapping 17 women and children. The attack became known as the Derdepoort Massacre and J.C.C. den Beer Poortugael highlighted Derdepoort as one of the atrocities that should be prosecuted under the Hague Convention. General Snyman met with a British officer near Crocodile Pools on 2 December to negotiate the safe return of all the women and children.

=== Overseeing the Siege of Kuruman ===
On 26 November, General Snyman requisitioned 700 rifles and ammunition for Field Cornet J.H. Visser, who with a fighting force of 400 burghers, lay siege to the administrative settlement of Kuruman. The siege ended with the surrender of the British garrison on New Year's Day. Twelve British officers and 120 police were captured, among them Captain Bates (Cape Police, formerly Captain British Bechuanaland Police under General Sir Frederick Carrington) and Captain Dennison (Intelligence Department).

=== Battling Methuen ===
The Western Transvaal involved several strong and mobile Boer commandos with artillery pieces moved about, and an energetic warfare raged between Generals Snyman, Lemmer and De La Rey from the South African Republic and General Metheun, Major General Douglas, Brigadier General Broadwood and Brigadier General Hay (Lord Erroll) from the British Empire.

=== Exchanging Sarah Wilson for Petrus Viljoen ===
On 4 December 1899, Lady Sarah Wilson was detained when entering the cordon of the Boer regiment surrounding Mafeking. Her captors politely suggested that she would find "pleasant ladies' society" in Pretoria but Lady Sarah Wilson was determined to enter Mafeking and General Snyman offered to permit her to do so in exchange for Petrus Viljoen, the grandson of the pioneer hunter and ex-Commandant of the Marico district, Jan Viljoen. Colonel Baden-Powell initially refused to the exchange as he knew Viljoen's extensive knowledge of the town and its fortifications would be invaluable to General Snyman, offering instead a certain Jeffrey Delport. General Snyman managed to persuade Colonel Baden-Powell to accept his terms and Lady Sarah Wilson was given permission to enter Mafeking in exchange for Petrus Viljoen on 7 December. Petrus Viljoen was very happy to see his wife and was welcomed with great cheer. Viljoen provided General Snyman with a detailed report of conditions in Mafeking and was also able to point out to the crews of the guns where and when to shoot to best effect.

=== Baden Powells attack at Platboomfort ===
On 26 December 1899, Colonel Baden-Powell planned and attempted a real attack on the Game Tree Fort (Platboomfort in Afrikaans) position under command of General Snyman, and the result, as reported to the Executive at Pretoria, was disastrous for the British forces. The assault was combined with cannon, Maxim, and musketry, and an armored train protecting the rear of the assailants. Losses were so severe on the British side that General Snyman gave orders for his men to assist in hoisting the dead and wounded into their vehicles, assistance which was most thankfully acknowledged by Colonel Baden-Powell himself. Total casualties on the British side included 108 dead and wounded whereas Snyman's force suffered only one dead and two seriously wounded. General Snyman reported that the cartridges taken from the enemy during the morning's battle were dumdum bullets. The British officers who died during the attack included Captain Ronald James Vernon (King's Royal Rifle Corps), Captain H.C. Sandford (Indian Staff Corps), Lieutenant Harold Percival Paton, Sergeant-Major F.D. Paget, Sergeant H.L. Ross and Sergeant R.H. Barry.

=== Death penalty ===
On 28 December, the Executive Council [Uitvoerende Raad in Afrikaans] of the South African Republic granted General Snyman the authority to ratify and mitigate the death penalty according to the nature and degree of the offence, and impose capital punishment for serious crimes. This right was afforded to Commandant-General P.J. Joubert and Chief-Officers Piet Cronje, Schalk Willem Burger, Johannes Hermanus Michiel Kock, Lucas Johannes Meyer and Frederik Albertus Grobler.

On 19 January 1900, General Snyman sent a cavalry contingent of 250 burghers to reinforce the frontier at Colenso in Natal.

=== British retreat at Lobatse ===
On 6 March, British forces advanced to Lobatse, which they occupied. They repaired the telegraph lines and began operating the communication lines on 7 March. The British forces made preparations to advance southwards. Lieutenant-Colonel William Bodle advanced to Pitsani Potlogo and the railway was repaired to that point. On 15 March, a large force under General Snyman advanced rapidly from Mafeking, attacking the advance of Lieutenant-Colonel William Bodle's party, and threatened an attack on Lobatse. General Snyman's force shelled the British position at Lobatse late that evening, killing Lieutenant Arthur John Tyler, 1st West Riding Regiment, and capturing Lieutenant H. Chapman. The British forces were dislodged from their positions and forced to retreat to Crocodile Pools. Amongst the items captured by General Snyman there were seven chests of Lee-Metford ammunition.

=== Rebuffing Plumer ===
On 27 March, Colonel Herbert Plumer set out from Sefetili (Mathete) with approximately 270 mounted cavalrymen, 80 infantry and a machine-gun to Ramathlabama in a planned charge on General Snyman's position at Mafeking. Snyman sent 100 horsemen and Commandant Pieter D. Swart departed from Lobatse to intercept the British advance. Snyman joined his men with reinforcements and engaged in a brief battle, driving Plumer back to Sefetili with the British forces numbering nine killed, 30 wounded (including Plumer) and 14 men reported missing. The Boer forces numbered one man killed and two lightly wounded. General Snyman sent a message to Colonel Baden-Powell to send an ambulance to evacuate Plumer's wounded. Baden-Powell's close friend, Captain Kenneth McLaren, was among the wounded. The Boer successes about Mafeking, where General Snyman defeated Baden-Powell's garrison and Plumer's relief force both in one day, greatly heartened the pro-Boer press.

=== Aftermath of the Relief of Mafeking and Diamond Hill ===
On 26 April, the total force that besieged Mafeking numbered 700 burghers. On 14 May General De la Rey arrived at Snyman's Mafeking laager where the combined force set out to meet Colonel Bryan Mahon. General Snyman's main laager was situated at McMullen's farm to the east of Mafeking and De la Rey's laager sat on Israel's farm to the west of Mafeking near the Malopo River. The clash took place at Saanie's Pool near the Molopo River on 16 May and the fighting continued until late that night. General Liebenberg joined from the west and together the Boers succeeded in driving Mahon's troops over the river. Colonel Mahon had lost approximately 60 troops at Saanie's Pool and was anxious, if possible, to get into Mafeking without another engagement. Mahon received a signal from Major Karri Davis that he had safely passed into Mafeking. At eleven o' clock on the Wednesday night orders were quietly passed for Mahon's men to rise and move forward silently. Every precaution was taken with the head of Mahon's column entering Mafeking at 3:30 am on the morning of the 17th.

Snyman had already relocated his headquarters to the top of Abjaterskop, from where he could observe much of the territory under his command, an area stretching from Lobatse in the South to Derdepoort in the North. His objective was to stop the British forces, then congregating in Gaborone, after having landed in Beira, Mozambique on their way from India. On 20 May General Snyman's forces regrouped east of Polfontein after which Snyman commanded the Boer forces in the Pretoria district, including Bronkhorstspruit, following General Louis Botha's withdrawal eastwards.

On 11 and 12 June General Snyman participated in the Battle of Diamond Hill (Slag van Donkerhoek in Afrikaans). At this point General de la Rey had General Snyman under his command with a strong force drawn from the western Commandos. The Transvaal forces achieved a measure of success confirmed by the fact that the war would continue for two more years.

=== War council at Balmoral, 2 July 1900 ===
At a War Council held at Balmoral on 2 July 1900, attended by 42 military officers and presided over by Louis Botha, letters from Vice-President Schalk Willem Burger, and Generals Snyman, Oosthuizen and Douthwaite were read to the Council followed by a proposal from Captain Daniel J. Theron, in which it was requested that - since the civilian government had left Pretoria - a military administration should take over and the war should be continued with vigor. This proposal was rejected out of hand by a large majority of votes. Generals Snyman, S.P. Du Toit, P.J. Liebenberg and C.M. Douthwaite received letters of appreciation for their services and were honourably discharged. In addition, Generals C.E. Fourie, H.J. Schoeman, F.A. Grobler and D.J.E. Erasmus were also relieved of their commands.

=== Continued fight in West Transvaal ===
General Snyman continued to fight in West Transvaal under General De la Rey. For the next two years and the remainder of the war, General Snyman and General F.A. Grobler from the Waterberg district, moved into action against Colonel Robert Baden-Powell, Major General Horace Smith-Dorrien, Lieutenant-General Frederick Carrington and later against Field Marshal Lord Methuen.

On 5 June 1901, General Snyman crossed the Orange River into the Cape Province with a cavalry contingent of a hundred men, joining forces with Commandant Hendrik Willem Lategan from Colesberg who was stationed with his commando south-west of Venterstad in the Albert district. The raids carried out by Snyman and Lategan and other commanders were of particular importance to the Boers. By keeping up the pressure on the British forces in the Cape Province, several British columns were pinned down there, columns that would otherwise have been free to reinforce other sectors against the Boers. These raids diverted attention from General Christiaan De Wet permitting him to consolidate and reorganize his force after his failed invasion.

Towards the end of the war in May 1902, General P.J. Liebenberg continued to recruit burghers on his way south from the Magaliesberg, splitting his forces into three between Snyman, C.M. Douthwaite, and S.P. Du Toit, who tirelessly attacked the British forces from their operational bases located at Gatsrand.

Following the signing of the Treaty of Vereniging on 29 May, General De la Rey appointed General Snyman's son Evert as an officer of the Transvaal and Free State Rebel force that would go into rebellion to recover their lost independence and also asked Snyman's son to brief those men on whom he could rely on in an emergency.

== Discussion ==
General Snyman's role during the Anglo Boer War has attracted opposing views with the siege of Mafeking taking center stage in the international and British media. The incorporation of foreign contingents into the Boer army was no easy task - especially since some of these soldiers were not content to do their duty and either fight or die, but instead criticized the Boer command. An example of this was the case of Abraham Stafleu, a Dutch teacher whose wife died shortly after birthing their first child, leaving Stafleu to care for the baby by himself. At the outbreak of the war, Stafleu joined Snyman's regiment as a non-official member of the Red Cross.

Historians emphasize the fact that General Snyman had a greater task than is generally known, adding that critics who accuse him for not overwhelming the defenses of Mafeking fail to consider that General Cronje and the Transvaal Government in Pretoria maintained that a forceful attack on Mafeking would end in tragedy. Specifically, it was a well-known fact that the town was defended by dynamite mines and traps. In addition, there was a stockpile of 22 tons of dynamite located in the town of Mafeking that would prohibit any large-scale offensive.

On General Cronje's departure, he was given instructions to collect as many of the men involved in the siege of Mafeking as could be spared without preventing the continuation of the siege, and move south to reinforce the Free State burghers who were at the Battle of Belmont, to stop the northwards march of British forces at Kimberley. What Cronje had failed to do, Snyman could hardly be expected to accomplish with a considerably reduced force.

A pressing problem for Snyman's men were their own supplies. Although these arrived spasmodically from Ottoshoop, food became an ever-increasing problem as only 2500 head of cattle apparently survived the rinderpest in the district, while the pandemic also decimated cattle stocks over the border. Patrols combed the surrounding farms for stock and in one such instance the Rustenburg patrol brought in 150 slaughtered sheep belonging to Thys Snyman, General Snyman's son.

To make matters worse, President Kruger often interfered, ordering movements and assaults on Ladysmith and Mafeking, to the disgust of both General Snyman and Commandant-General Joubert. A notable example was the insistence by Lieutenant Sarel Eloff, the twenty-eight-year-old grandson of President Kruger, to storm the town. Snyman resented this interference on the part of the president through his grandson, a junior officer. Snyman refused to entertain the ill-devised plan and Eloff nevertheless stormed the town with a small group of foreign volunteers. The result was Eloff's surrender with 97 men after a loss of eight killed and 28 wounded.

Sol Plaatje complimented General Snyman, who agreed to take Sunday as a day of rest from the siege of Mafeking, so that the besieged could visit their families, do some wash, keep the Sabbath, and ''make all-round preparations for another week's bombardment''.

General Snyman maintained that prisoners must be treated according to the law. He introduced a truce for Sunday worship, and has been described as an exceedingly courteous gentleman, a staunch Government man, and one of the shrewdest and best-to-do burghers in the district. He has also been described as energetic, strict, daring, a very worthy militarist and a hero.

General Snyman represented the characteristic spirit or ethos of the ''bitter-ender'' (Bittereinder in Afrikaans) by doing his duty until the very end of the war (31 May 1902), this despite having received an honourable discharge and an official letter of appreciation on 2 July 1900.
