= Paardekraal =

Paardekraal may refer to:

- Paardekraal suburb of Rustenburg
- Paardekraal, former name of Krugersdorp
- Paardekraal Monument (built 1890) in Krugersdorp
