= Kenneth McLaren =

Kenneth McLaren DSO (sometimes given as "MacLaren"), (1860–1924) was a Major in the 13th Hussars regiment of the British Army. After his military service, he was briefly involved with his friend Robert Baden-Powell in the early promotion of the Scout Movement.

== Military service ==
Son of H. McLaren, of The Chalet, Tighnabruaich, Argyllshire, Scotland (the family home was later Dunmar at Tighnabruaich) McLaren was educated at Harrow and Sandhurst before being assigned to the 13th Hussars in 1880. He was posted to India, where he served as regimental adjutant and later aide de camp to General Baker Russell. In South Africa, he was gravely wounded during the Siege of Mafeking in March 1900 and taken prisoner by the Boers. He was created a Companion of the Distinguished Service Order (DSO) in November 1900. McLaren played polo throughout his military service and was umpire of one of the two matches in the 1908 London Olympics.

McLaren first met Baden-Powell (also a 13th Hussars officer) in 1881. Although McLaren was 20 at the time, Baden-Powell nicknamed him "the Boy", on account of his appearance. The two became fast friends, their relationship being one of the most important friendships in Baden-Powell's life.

McLaren volunteered his services and was recalled to military service in World War I, serving in France with the Casualty Records Department but retired again in 1915 due to the onset of the first symptoms of "softening of the brain" (according to Baden-Powell his friend suffered also from "melancholia").

== Boy Scouts ==
McLaren was one of the staff at Baden-Powell's Brownsea Island Scout camp in 1907. Baden-Powell convinced McLaren to be his first manager at the C. Arthur Pearson Limited office of The Scout magazine but McLaren resigned that position in March 1908.

== Personal life ==
McLaren was born on 18 October 1860 in Salford, Lancashire.

In 1898 in Marylebone, McLaren married Leila Evelyn Landon. Their daughter, Eileen Leila M., was born in 1899 in Brixworth, Northants; Baden-Powell was her godfather. He had been unable to return from India to serve as best man at McLaren's wedding. Leila McLaren died in Kensington in 1904 aged 29 of "disseminated sclerosis".

In 1910 in Driffield, Yorkshire, McLaren married his wife's former nurse, Ethel Mary Wilson. She was the daughter of a "struggling south Yorkshire farmer" and Baden-Powell, who did not consider her a "lady", advised McLaren against the marriage. Although at the time of their wedding Baden-Powell was crossing the Atlantic after a tour of North America, so could not attend, he had no intention of attending. McLaren was not invited to Baden-Powell's own very private wedding in 1912. Owing to Olave Baden-Powell's jealousy over Baden-Powell's friendships, the two men never met again.

After retiring from the Army in 1915 due to symptoms of "softening of the brain", McLaren spent the last years of his life confined at Camberwell House Asylum and at a smaller private mental hospital in Hertfordshire. MacLaren died in Camberwell in 1924; Baden-Powell did not attend his funeral but remained in contact with his goddaughter Eilean, inviting her to stay a few days each month and sending her birthday greetings. In 1942 in Cockermouth she married Walter Woodford, a boatman, they later separated and he went to ply his trade on the Norfolk coast, and had a son; her later life was "wretched" and she drank heavily, dying of cancer aged 57 in Brixworth in 1957. Her son Christopher found "nothing at all connected with his grandfather" in her possession.
