= Siege of Mafeking =

1899–1900 siege of the Second Boer War

- Part of Second Boer War
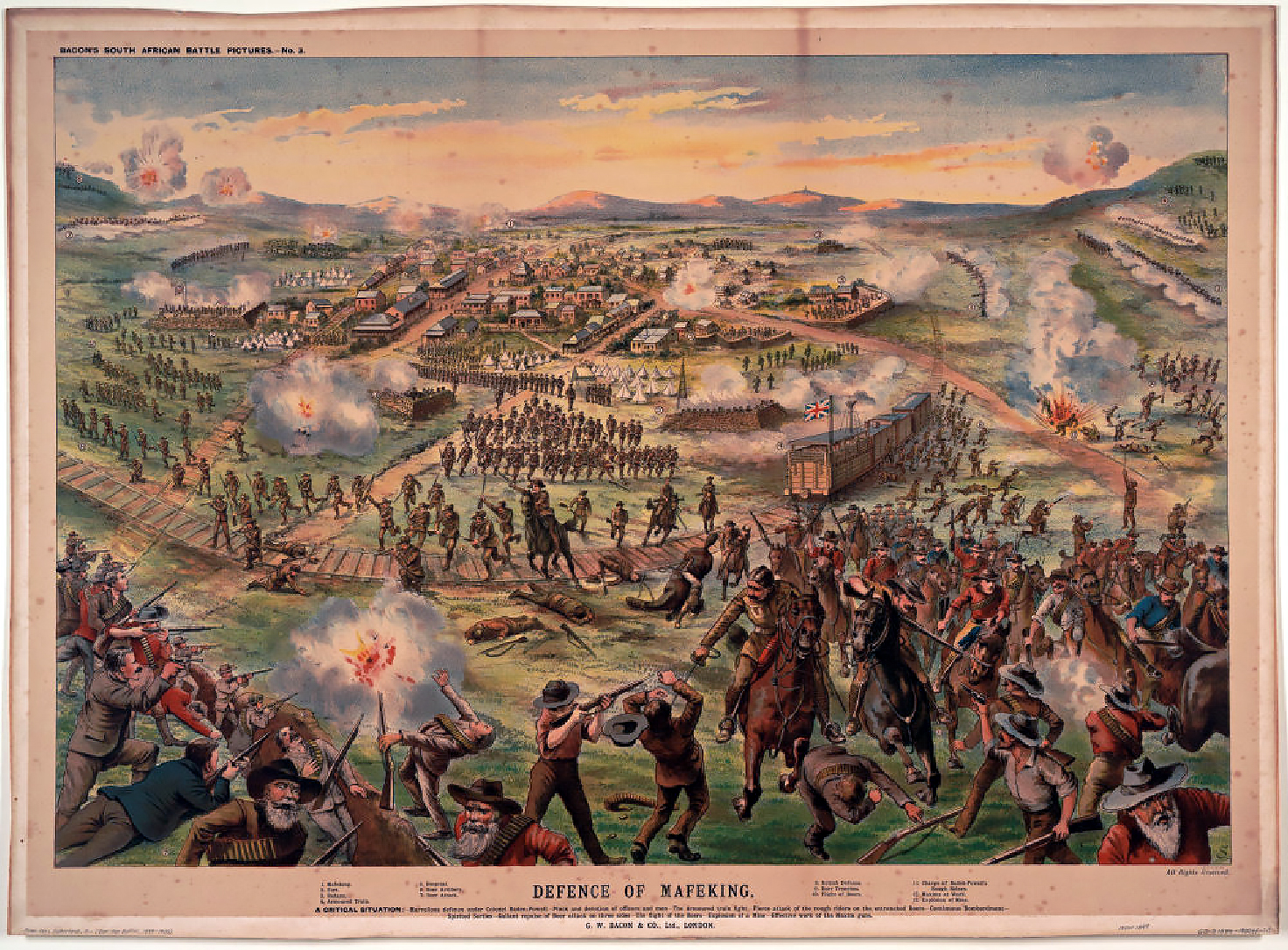
- British Troops repelling a Boer attack at Mafeking
Date	13 October 1899 – 17 May 1900 (7 months and 4 days)
Location	Mafikeng, Cape Colony (present-day South Africa)
Result	British victory: Mafeking relieved

Belligerents
British Empire: United Kingdom; Canada (Note: During the relief); Cape Colony (Note: During the relief)	South African Republic; Orange Free State

Commanders and leaders
(United Kingdom of Great Britain and Ireland) Robert Baden-Powell (United Kingdom of Great Britain and Ireland) Bryan Mahon	(South African Republic) Piet Cronjé (South African Republic) Jacobus Snyman (Orange Free State) Petrus Liebenberg

Strength
1,500	8,000

Casualties and losses
212 killed 600+ wounded	2,000

The siege of Mafeking was a 217-day siege battle for the town of Mafeking (now called Mahikeng) in South Africa during the Second Boer War from October 1899 to May 1900. The siege received considerable attention as Lord Edward Cecil, the son of the British prime minister, was in the besieged town, as also was Lady Sarah Wilson, a daughter of the Duke of Marlborough and aunt of Winston Churchill. The siege turned the British commander, Colonel Robert Baden-Powell, into a national hero. The Relief of Mafeking (the lifting of the siege), while of little military significance, was a morale boost for the struggling British.

== Prelude ==
Shortly before the outbreak of the Second Boer War in 1899, Lord Wolseley, Commander-in-Chief of the British Army, who had failed to persuade the British government to send troops to the region, instead sent Colonel Robert Baden-Powell, accompanied by a handful of officers, to the Cape Colony to raise two regiments of mounted rifles from Rhodesia. Their aims were to maintain a mobile cavalry force on the frontier with the Boer republic of the Transvaal.

Like the British government, politicians in South Africa feared that increased military activity might provoke a Boer attack, so the British officers were provided with rifles and ammunition, but no artillery, and no horses, which, in those days, generally regarded as quite important for a mobile column. The people in the town decided to obtain many of their own stores, organise their own transport and recruit in secret. Although the two regiments were raised in Rhodesia, Baden-Powell chose Mafeking to store supplies for his forces due to its location – both near the border and on the railway between Bulawayo and Kimberley – and because of its status as a local administrative centre. Also, the town had good stocks of food and other necessities. However, Mafeking was isolated, exposed and close to Boer-controlled areas. Baden-Powell, whose orders were to command a highly mobile field force of cavalry, chose to immobilise half his force to hold Mafeking against a Boer attack. Many of Baden-Powell's recruits were untrained and he was aware of the Boers' greatly superior numbers, commando tactics and the failure of the earlier Jameson Raid and decided that the best way to tie down Boer troops would be through defence rather than attack. In August 1899, Baden-Powell started recruiting (in secret, to avoid negative political effects) and many of his recruits were untrained, many had never ridden before, so were unsuited for a "mobile column". His forces that remained outside the besieged town were well trained, had their own horses, and they performed remarkably well in their intended mobile role.

The forces defending Mafeking totalled about 2,000, including the Protectorate Regiment of about 500 men, about 300 from the Bechuanaland Rifles and the Cape Police and a further 300 men from the town. The British garrison armed 300 African natives with rifles, these were nicknamed the "Black Watch" and used to guard the perimeter. Prior to the siege, Lord Edward Cecil formed the Mafeking Cadet Corps of boys aged 12 to 15 who acted as messengers and orderlies and released men to fight (later claimed to be one of the inspirations for the Boy Scouts).

== Siege ==
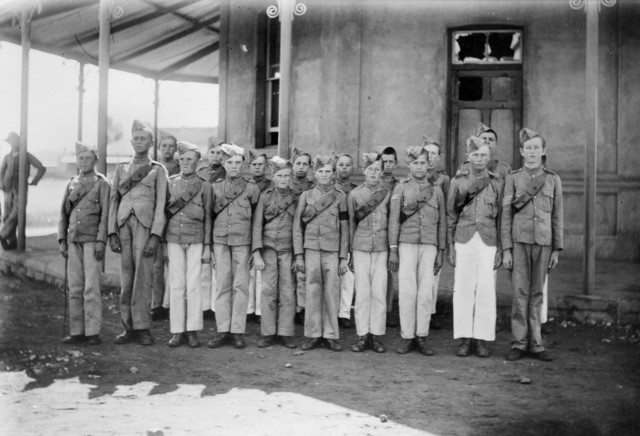
Mafeking Cadets during the siege

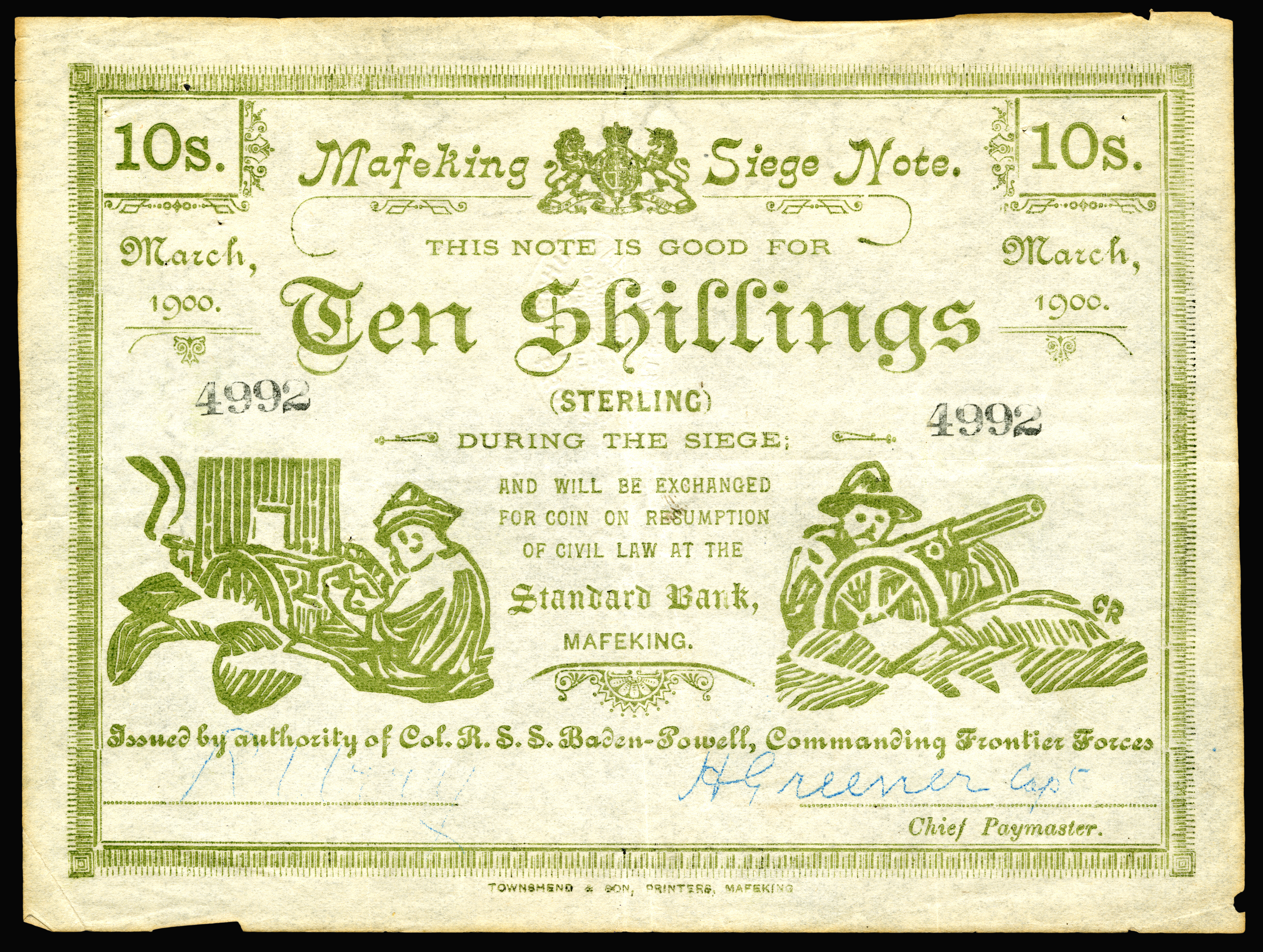
10 shillings siege money currency, issued by Baden-Powell at Mafeking

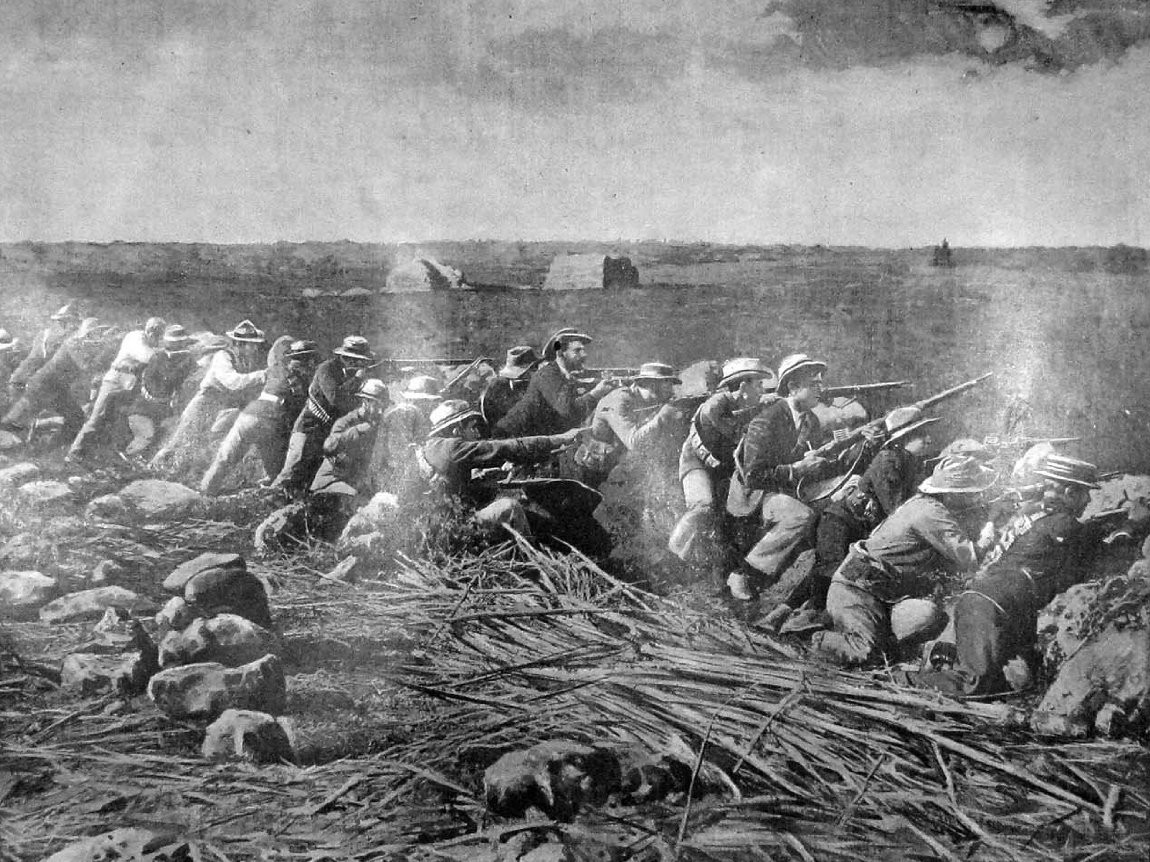
Picture from The Graphic of Boers firing from their trenches at the siege

Work to build defences around the 6-mile (10 km) perimeter of Mafeking started on 19 September 1899; the town would eventually be equipped with an extensive network of trenches and gun emplacements. President Kruger of the Boer South African Republic declared war on 12 October 1899. Under orders of General Piet Cronje the Mafeking railway and telegraph lines were cut the same day, and the town began to be besieged from 13 October. Mafeking was first shelled on 16 October after the British commanders ignored Cronje's 9 o’clock deadline to surrender.

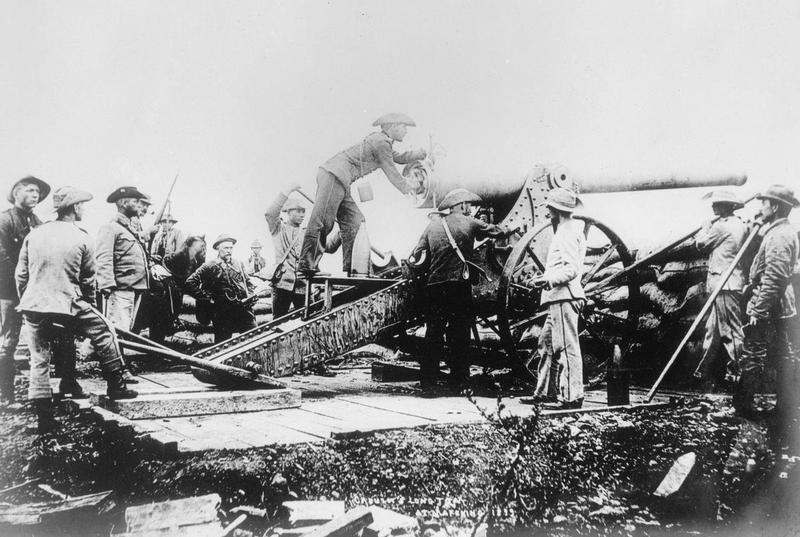
The Boer "Long Tom" in action during the siege

Although usually considerably outnumbered by Boer troops, the garrison withstood the siege for 217 days, defying the predictions of the politicians on both sides. In reality, the Boers risked little to tie up Baden-Powell's force and stores and for most of the time the number of Boers actively engaged in the siege were few. While at one time the Boer troops numbered over 8,000 and more artillery was briefly brought up, most of these were merely moving through the siege camp. The Boers were able to take control of the railway and roads just outside the town and used the siege camp as a staging post. Baden-Powell remained invested in the town despite repeated orders and, for most of the time until he ate his own horses, having the capacity to break out. But he would still have needed a base from which to operate. With few soldiers, no modern artillery and little risk, the defenders kept as many as 8,000 Boers from deploying to other war fronts in Natal and the Orange Free State. Some authors believe that this has been overattributed to cunning deceptions instituted by Baden-Powell. Fake landmines were laid around the town in view of the Boers and their spies within the town, and his soldiers were ordered to simulate avoiding barbed wire (non-existent) when moving between trenches; guns and a searchlight (improvised from an acetylene lamp and biscuit tin) were moved around the town to increase their apparent number. A howitzer was built in Mafeking's railway workshops, and even an old cannon (dated 1770, it coincidentally had "B.P. & Co." engraved on the barrel) was pressed into service. Noticing that the Boers had failed to remove any of the rails, the British commanders had an armoured train from the Mafeking railyard loaded with sharpshooters, armed with the Martini-Henry Mark IV rifle, sent up the rail line in a daring attack right into the heart of the Boer camp, followed by a return to Mafeking. However, the casualties made this Baden-Powell's only attempt at such an attack and, again, it raised questions as to why Baden-Powell did not mount a break-out. Often British soldiers had to dress as women just to undertake normal activities such as fetching water and sewing to deceive the enemy.

The morale of the civilian population was given attention, and Sunday ceasefires were negotiated so that sports, competitions and theatrical performances could be held. Notable were the cricket matches held on a Sunday. Initially, the religious sensibilities of General Jacobus Philippus Snyman (in command after Cronje departed) were offended, and he threatened to fire upon the players if they continued. Eventually Snyman relented and even invited the British to a game. Baden-Powell replied that first he had to finish the present match, in which the score was "200 days, not out"!

As in the case of the nearby siege of Kimberley, the Boers decided that the town was too heavily defended to take. On 19 November 1899, 4,000 Boers were redeployed elsewhere, although the siege remained and shelling of Mafeking continued. Aware of the approaching British relief columns, the Boers launched a final major attack early in the morning of 12 May that succeeded in breaching the perimeter defences and setting fire to some of the town, but were finally beaten back.

=== Boer attack ===
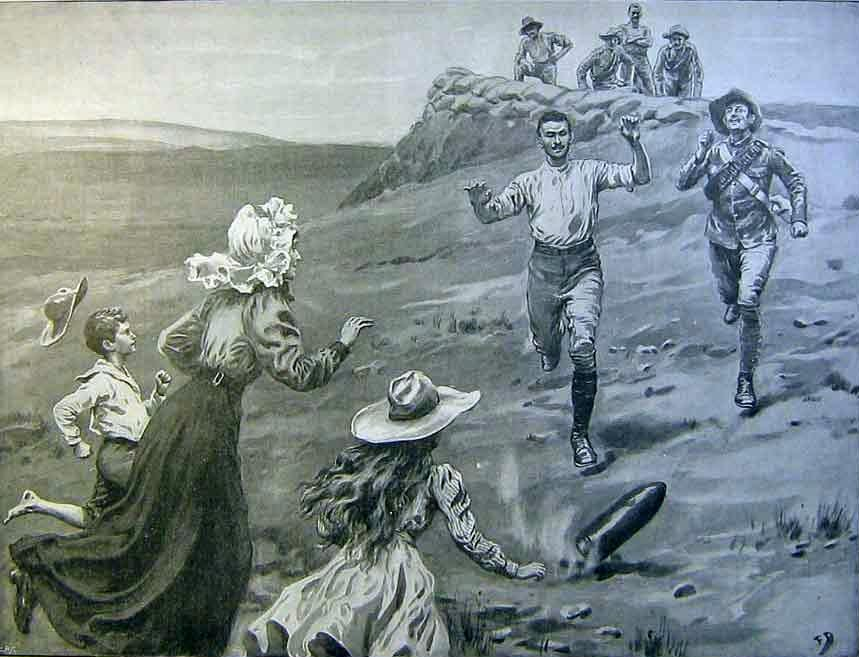
Frank Dadd: Racing after a spent shell

On 12 May, at about 4 a.m., Field Cornet S. Eloff led a force of 240 Boers in a daring assault on Mafeking. Covered by a feint attack on the east side of the town, the attackers slipped between the Hidden Hollow and Limestone forts on the western face of the defences. Guided by a British deserter, they followed a path beside the Molopo River to where it enters the stadt, the village where the native Africans lived. Eloff's party burst into the stadt unopposed and set fire to the huts in order to signal the attack's progress to Snyman. By about 5:30 a.m., the Boers seized the police barracks on the outskirts of Mafeking, killing one and capturing the garrison's second-in-command, Colonel C. O. Hore and 29 others. Eloff picked up the telephone connected with the British garrison headquarters and boasted to Baden-Powell of his success.

The fire had, however, already alerted Mafeking's garrison, which responded rapidly to the crisis. The African police (of the Barolong tribe) had wisely stayed out of the way when Eloff's party roared through the stadt. As soon as the Boers moved on, the 109 armed Barolong cut off Eloff's escape route. Snyman, "the most stolid and supine of all the Boer generals in the war", failed to support Eloff. Meanwhile, the elaborate telephone network of the town defences provided timely and accurate information. Major Alick Godley and B Squadron (Protectorate Regiment) were sent to smother the attack and along with D Squadron, some armed railway employees and others. Eloff's men were soon isolated into three groups.

With two squadrons, Godley first surrounded a group of Boers holed up in a stone kraal in the stadt. These men surrendered after a sharp fusillade. Godley drove the second group off a kopje and they mostly managed to escape. All day long, Eloff and the third group held out in the police barracks, finally capitulating in the night. The British lost 12 dead and 8 wounded, mostly Africans. Boer losses were 60 dead and wounded, plus a further 108 captured.

=== Stamps and currency ===
One curious factor that was unexpected was that the Post Office ran out of stamps, and there was a shortage of bank notes for the people to use in everyday dealings. The Postmaster suggested to Baden-Powell that he commission the local printer to print stamps, for use within the town. Baden-Powell agreed to this, but the printer, not wishing to encroach on the Royal Mail's prerogative, decided to use a picture of the Commanding Officer, Baden-Powell, instead of that of Queen Victoria. This was the first occasion where a non-royal's picture was used on a British postage stamp. Two stamps were issued,

- a one-penny, with a photograph of Cadet Sgt. Major Goodyear on a bicycle, designed by Dr W. A. Hayes, and
- a threepenny, with a photograph of Baden-Powell by Mr Ross, designed by Capt. H. Greener

"Baden-Powell is a wonderfully able scout and quick at sketches. I do not know another who could have done the work at Mafeking if the same conditions had been imposed. All the bits of knowledge he studiously gathered have been utilized in saving that community."

— Siege of Mafeking Abandoned by the Boers, Frederick Russell Burnham, the American scout, interviewed by The Times, 19 May 1900.

Similarly, to ease the problems caused by the lack of genuine banknotes, in late 1899 Baden-Powell authorised the issue of siege banknotes. Made by Townshend & Son, Printers (Mafeking) using woodcut printing, notes were backed by the Standard Bank of South Africa and issued in denominations of one-, two-, three- and 10-shilling coupons as well as £1 notes, of which 620 were printed. The intention was that, after the siege was over, these could be exchanged for genuine currency, but in practice few were; most were kept as souvenirs. The printer believed that perhaps only 20 would be cashed in, making a £600 profit for the Imperial exchequer. They currently sell for around £1500 each but are rarely sold.

Each note has the facsimile signatures of Robert Urry, the manager of the Mafeking branch of the Standard Bank of South Africa. and Captain Herbert Greener, Chief Paymaster of the British South Africa Police. Redemption of the notes ended in 1908.

=== Relief ===
The siege was finally lifted on 17 May 1900, when a flying column of some 2,000 British soldiers, including Canadians of "C" Battery, Royal Canadian Field Artillery, and many South African volunteers from Kimberley, commanded by Colonel B. T. Mahon of the army of Lord Roberts with Prince Alexander of Teck as his Aide-de-camp, relieved the town after fighting their way in.

== Aftermath ==
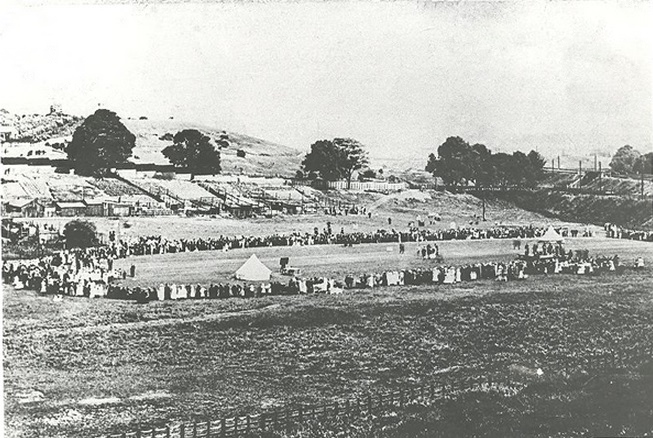
British people in a park in Stockport, celebrating the relief of Mafeking

Until reinforcements landed in February 1900, the war was going poorly for the British. The resistance to the siege was seen as one of the positive highlights in the media, and it and the eventual relief of the town excited the liveliest sympathy in Britain. There were immense celebrations in the country at the news of its relief, described humorously as 'mafficking' and creating the verb to maffick, as a back-formation from the place-name (meaning to celebrate both extravagantly and publicly). Some of these celebrations, as with those of the relief of Pretoria that followed soon after, sparked rioting in places including Paddington, Gloucester, Northampton, Peterhead, Leicester, Derby, Norwich, Edinburgh, and Banbury, prompting a motion in the House of Commons. Promoted to the youngest major-general in the army, and awarded the CB, Baden-Powell was also treated as a hero when he finally returned to Britain in 1903.

However, the remaining stores that Baden-Powell had amassed in Mafeking were so great that they were able to re-supply Mahon's force and operations in the area for some time. While a sorely needed publicity victory for the British, the British commanders believed Baden-Powell had been foolish to risk so many supplies and allow himself to be besieged and had made no effort to break out and had overstated the number of Boer forces tied up while in fact tying up considerably more British forces. For Baden-Powell, and in the British media, the siege was thought of as a victory, but for the more practical Boers it had been a strategic success. For no significant achievement, the townspeople and garrison suffered 212 killed and over 600 wounded. For the British Army commanders, it was a distraction and nuisance and, after Baden-Powell's further poor combat performance in completely abandoning the mostly Rhodesian soldiers and Australian diggers at Elands River, Baden-Powell was removed from any combat command.

Three Victoria Crosses were awarded as a result of acts of heroism during the siege, to Sergeant Horace Martineau and Trooper Horace Ramsden for acts during an attack on the Boer Game Tree Fort, and to Captain Charles FitzClarence for Game Tree and two previous actions.

== Legacy ==
In September 1904 Lord Roberts unveiled an obelisk at Mafeking bearing the names of those who fell in defence of the town.

The siege established Baden-Powell as a celebrity in Britain, and when he wrote Scouting for Boys in 1908, his fame contributed to the rapid growth of the Boy Scout Movement.

Several streets in the UK were named after Mafeking.

Mafeking memorials

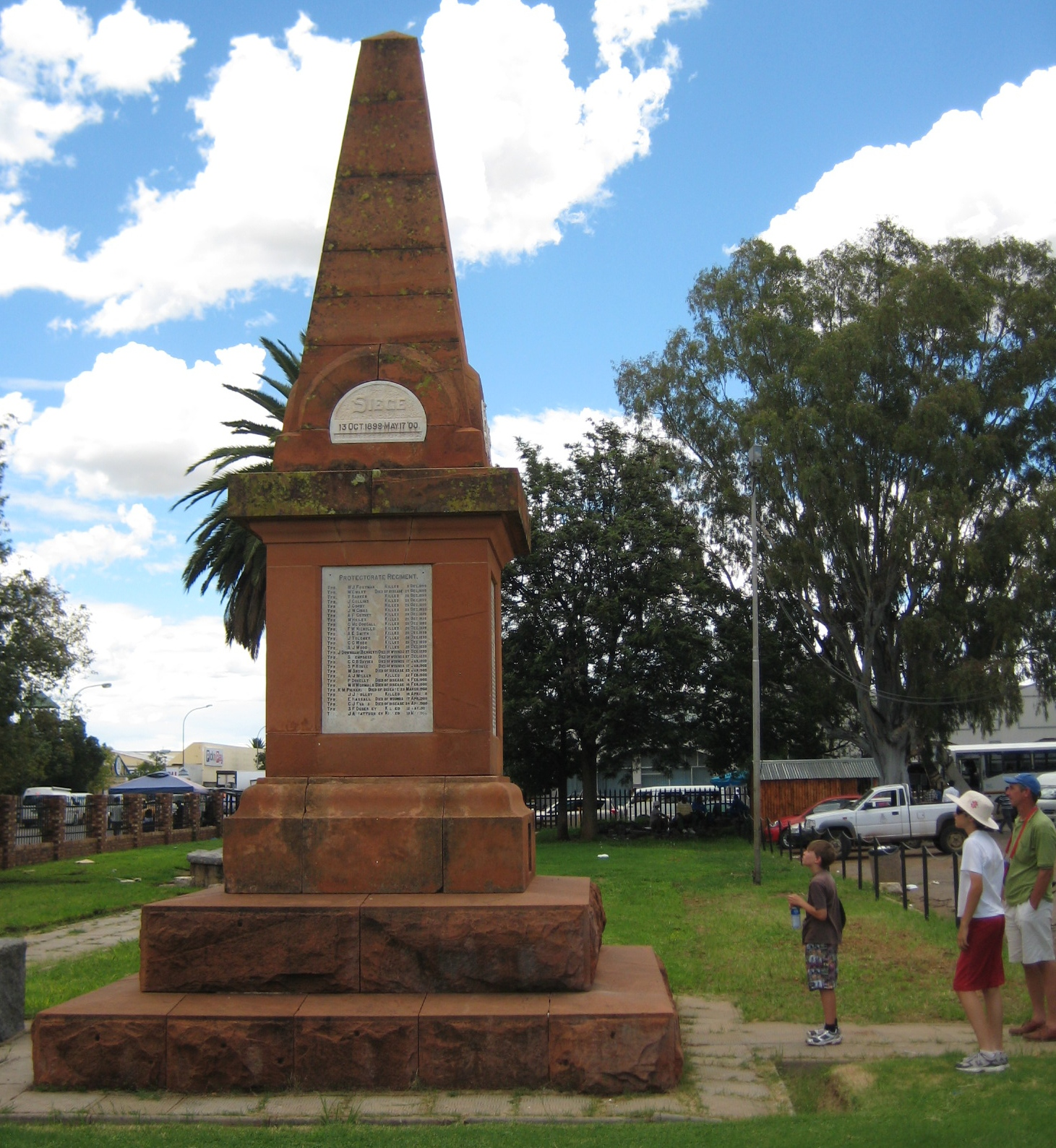
Overall view Mafeking Obelisk

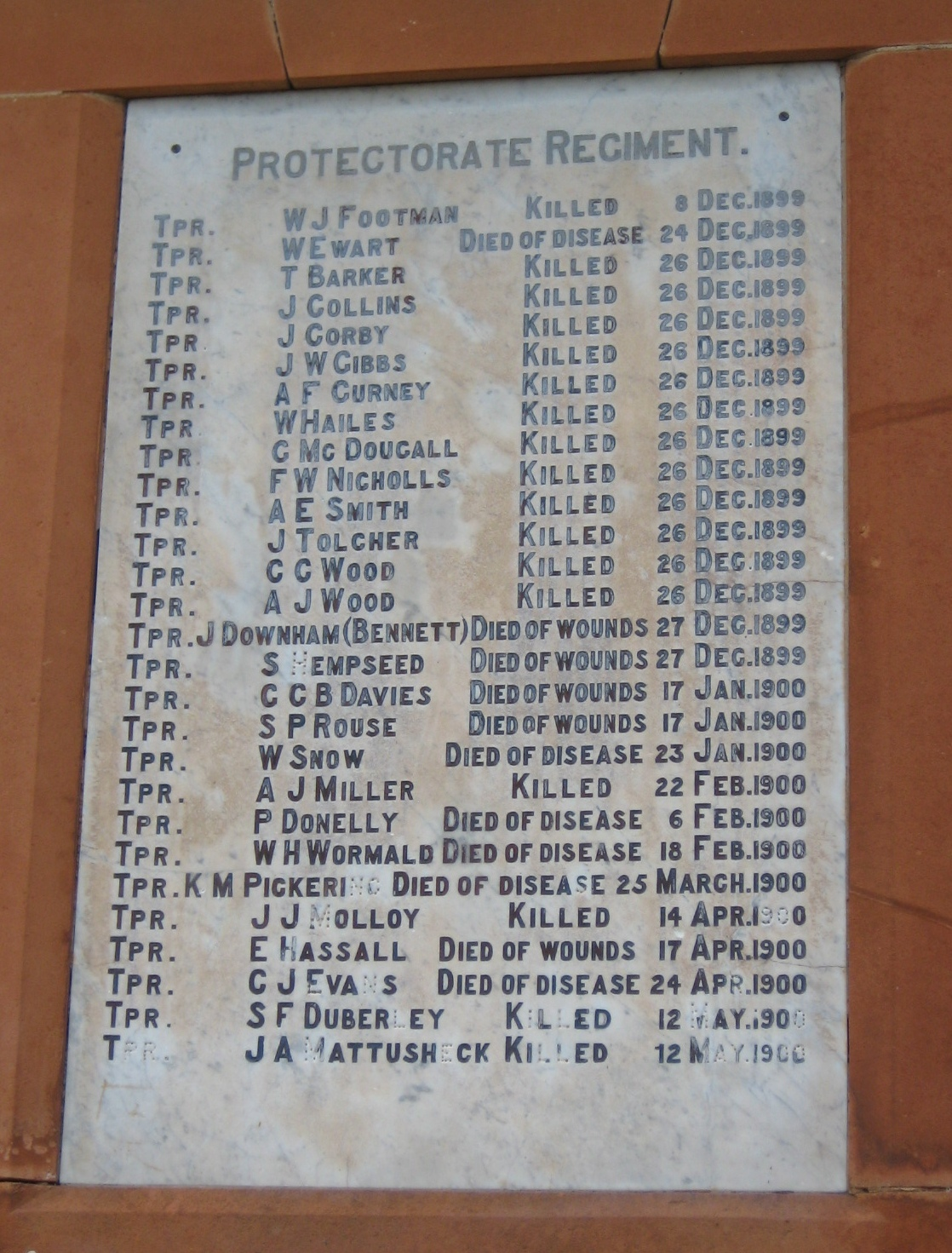
Detail panel 1 – Protectorate Regt. pt.1

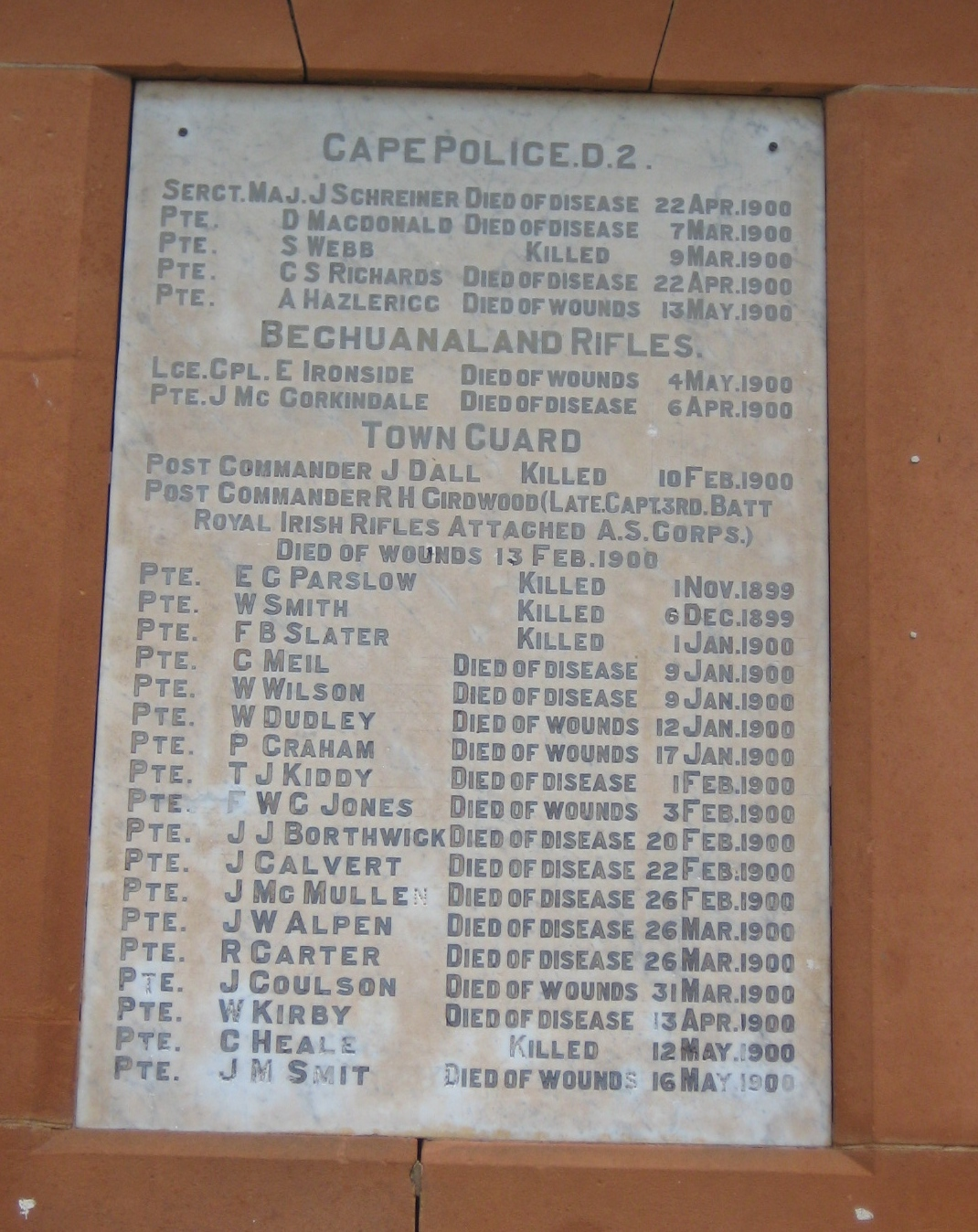
Detail panel 2 – Bechuanaland Rifles, etc.

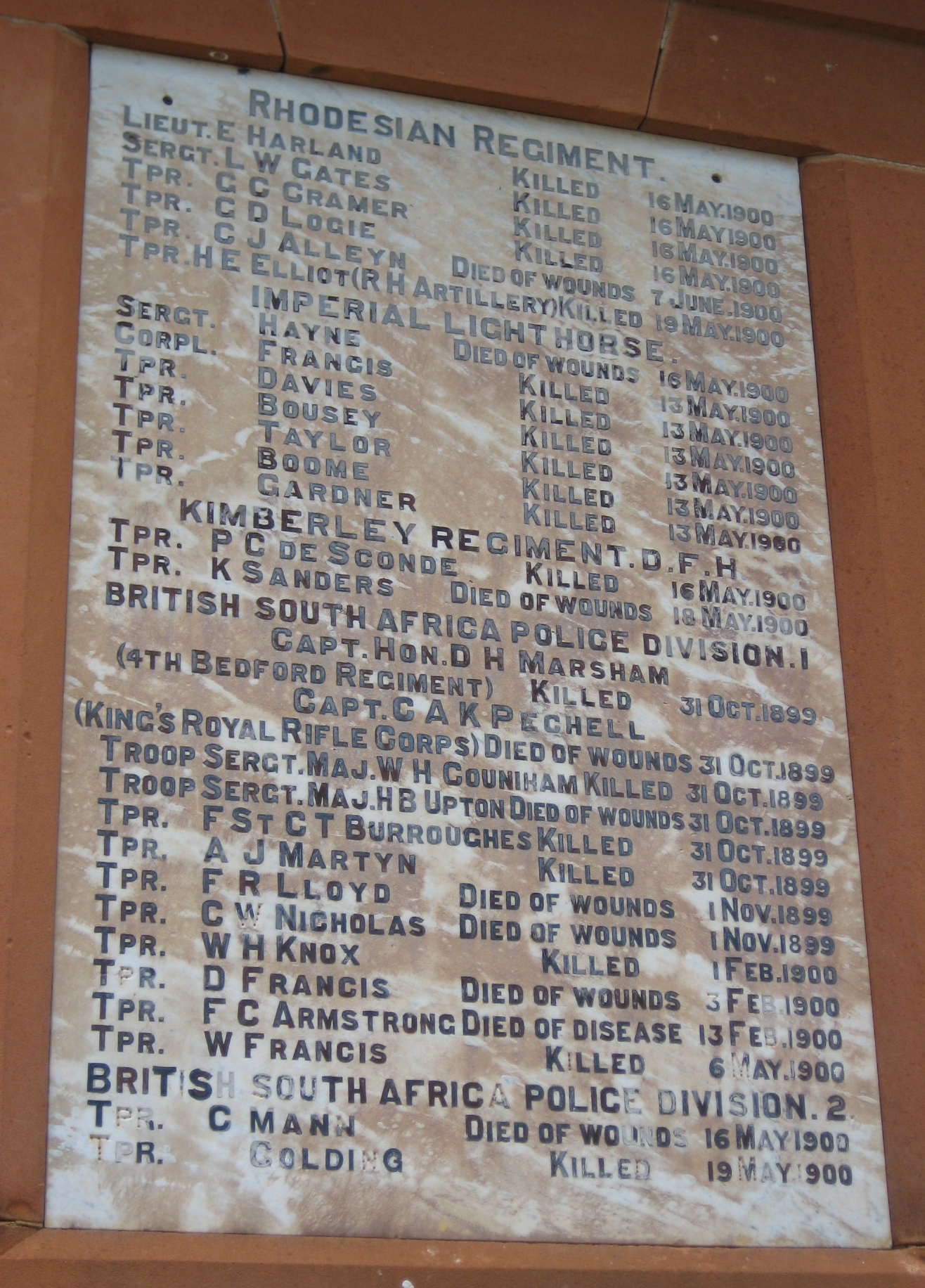
Detail panel 3 – British Sth Africa Police, etc.

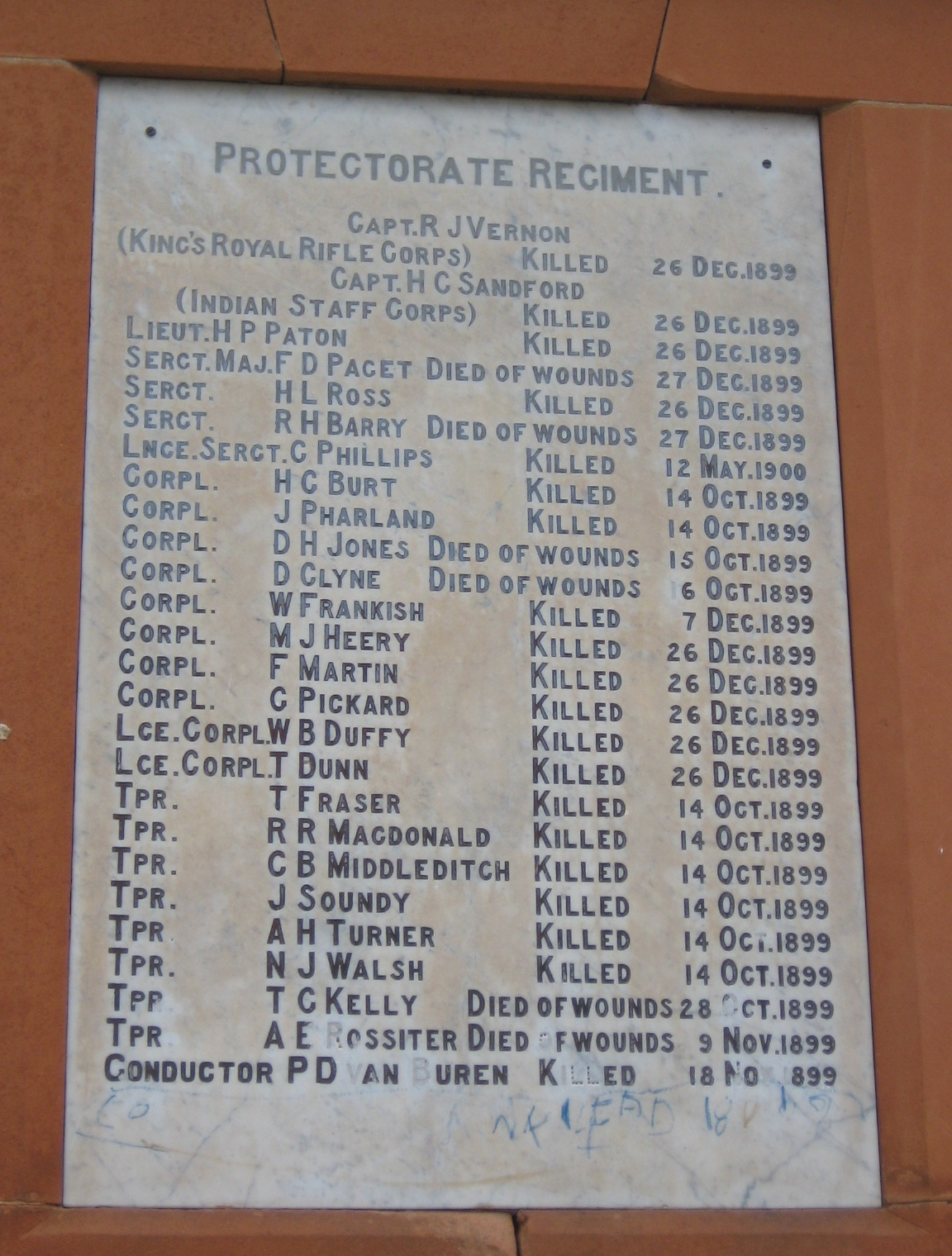
Detail panel 4 – Protectorate Regt. pt. 2

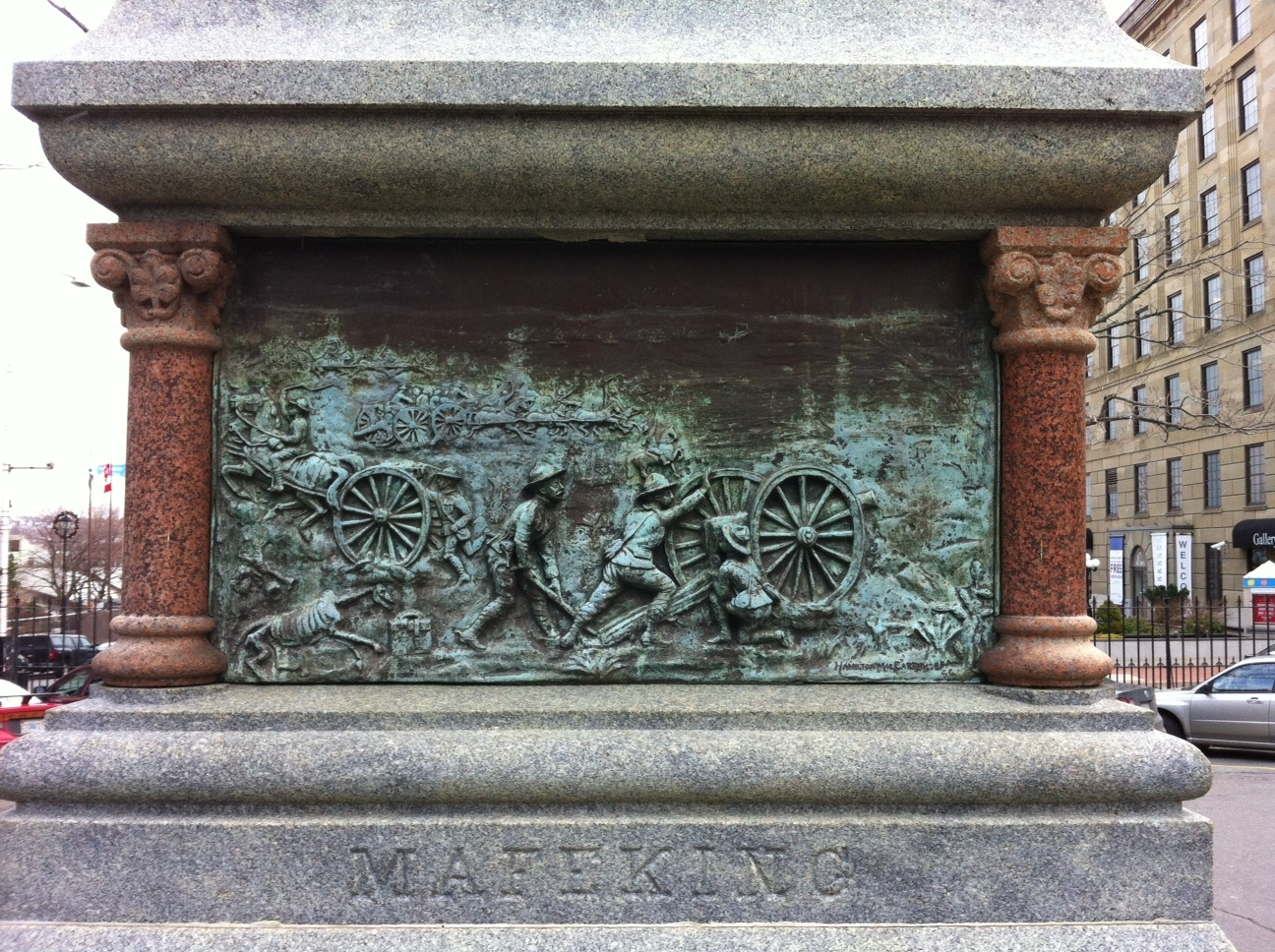
South African War Memorial (Halifax), Province House (Nova Scotia), Canada by Hamilton MacCarthy

== See also ==
- British military history
- British Empire
- History of South Africa
- Military history of South Africa
- Scouting
- Lady Sarah Wilson became the first female war correspondent, reporting from Mafeking
