= Protectorate Regiment =

British Army regiment of the Second Boer War

The Protectorate Regiment was a unit of the British Army that was raised for the Second Boer War. It was raised on 15 August 1899 in Cape Town and Mafeking and was disbanded in Cape Town during October 1900. Three members of the unit, Charles FitzClarence, Horace Martineau and Horace Ramsden were awarded the Victoria Cross for gallant acts during the war.
