= Horace Martineau =

Recipient of the Victoria Cross

Horace Martineau VC
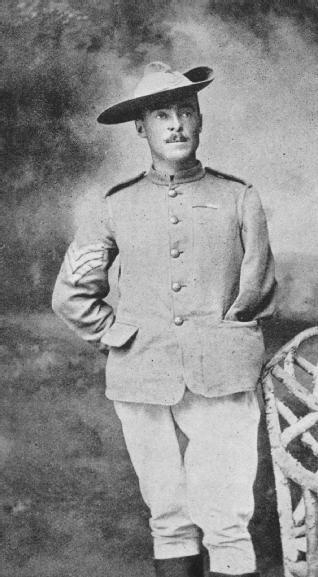
- Born: 31 October 1874; London, England
- Died: 7 April 1916 (aged 41); Dunedin, New Zealand
- Burial place: Andersons Bay Cemetery, Dunedin
- Military career
- Allegiance: United Kingdom; Cape Colony; New Zealand
- Branch: British Army; New Zealand Army
- Service years: 1891–1895, 1896–1900; 1914–1916
- Rank: Lieutenant
- Units: 11th Hussars; Cape Police; Protectorate Regiment; Otago Infantry Regiment
- Conflicts: Second Matabele War; Second Boer War; World War I
- Awards: Victoria Cross

Horace Robert Martineau VC (31 October 1874 – 7 April 1916) was a British recipient of the Victoria Cross, the highest award for gallantry in the face of the enemy that can be awarded to British and Commonwealth forces.

== Military career ==
Born and educated in London, Martineau enlisted in the 11th Hussars in 1891. He served in Natal and in India before buying his discharge and returning to South Africa in 1895. The next year he served in Colonel Sir Robert Baden-Powell's campaign against the Matebele, after which he joined the Cape Police.

=== Second Boer War ===
On the outbreak of the Second Boer War in 1899, Martineau joined the Protectorate Regiment (N.W. Cape Colony) as a sergeant. He was awarded the VC in an action near Mafeking. His citation in The London Gazette reads:

On the 26th December, 1899, during the fight at Game Tree, near Mafeking, when the order to retire had been given, Sergeant Martineau stopped and picked up Corporal Le Camp, who had been struck down about 10 yards from the Boer trenches, and half dragged, half carried, him towards a bush about 150 yards from the trenches. In doing this Sergeant Martineau was wounded in the side, but paid no attention to it, and proceeded to stanch and bandage the wounds of his comrade, whom he, afterwards, assisted to retire. The firing while they were retiring was very heavy and Sergeant Martineau was again wounded. When shot the second time he was absolutely exhausted from supporting his comrade, and sank down unable to proceed further. He received three wounds, one of which necessitated the amputation of his arm near the shoulder.

=== World War I ===
After the War Martineau took up employment with the African Boating Company in Durban, specialising in support to military forces. He joined the Durban Militia Reserve in 1903 attaining the rank of Captain before visiting New Zealand in 1914 when the First World War broke out. He immediately joined up as a territorial officer in the 14th (South Otago) Regiment, and enlisted as Lieutenant Martineau VC Battalion Transport Officer in the Otago Infantry Battalion, of the New Zealand Expeditionary Force. He subsequently served in Suez and at Gallipoli with the New Zealand Infantry Brigade, New Zealand and Australian Division of the Australian and New Zealand Army Corps (ANZAC).

After falling ill in the Gallipoli area of operations Martineau was evacuated to Egypt. After recovering he was visiting the Kursaal (public area of the town) in Alexandria on the evening of 17 September 1915, where in a cafe called the Pallotta Court he met Captain Hunt and Lieutenant King of the Royal Army Medical Corps. He became involved in an altercation with Captain Hunt which involved Martineau's use of insubordinate language. After an investigation of the charge the Commandant of Base Headquarters Alexandria, Brigadier-General McGregor, sent a letter to General Headquarters at Mudros on 21 September 1915 recommending that as Martineau was in possession of the VC "his services be dispensed with without trial and that he be sent back to New Zealand". While waiting for a verdict on his future Martineau once again fell ill and was admitted to No.2 Australian General Hospital at Ghezireh on 1 November with Colitis (inflammation of the gastrointestinal system). He was moved a week later to the New Zealand General Hospital at Pont de Kubba near Cairo and remained there until being discharged to board the Hospital Ship Maheno, which departed Suez for New Zealand on 29 November 1915. Martineau arrived back in New Zealand on New Year's Day 1916 and was granted sick leave. But the leave pass he was issued was worthless because he was no longer a member of the New Zealand Expeditionary Force. On 24 February 1916 the New Zealand Gazette issued an order under the authority of James Allen the Minister for Defence:

Lieutenant Horace Robert Martineau, V.C., attached to 14th (South Otago) Regiment is struck off the strength of the N.Z. Expeditionary Force, under the provisions of paragraph 11 (1), Expeditionary Force Act, 1915, with effect from 1st January, 1916.

As his health deteriorated Martineau remained in Dunedin instead of returning to South Africa. Serious stomach problems continued to afflict Martineau and contributed to his death just three months after returning from overseas service. He died in Dunedin Hospital on 7 April 1916 as a result of Gastritis and Haematemesis (the vomiting of blood due to prolonged erosion of the stomach lining) and was subsequently buried in Anderson's Bay Cemetery, Dunedin among other returned servicemen. As the illness was a continuation of the sickness he first contracted while on Gallipoli, Martineau was categorised as having died after discharge from the NZEF from disease contracted while on active service, and was included in the roll of honour listing New Zealand's war dead.

== Medal ==
Horace Martineau's VC and other campaign medals were sold at auction by Spink of London for £90,000 on 9 May 2002. The VC was bought for Lord Ashcroft's VC Collection and is on display at the Lord Ashcroft VC Gallery in the Imperial War Museum in London.

== See also ==
- Monuments to Courage (David Harvey, 1999)
- The Register of the Victoria Cross (This England, 1997)
- Victoria Crosses of the Anglo-Boer War (Ian Uys, 2000)
