= Charles FitzClarence =

British Army general and recipient of the Victoria Cross

Brigadier-General Charles FitzClarence VC
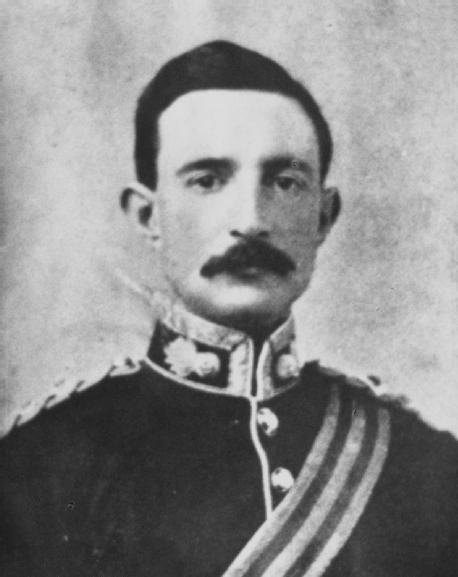
- Born: 8 May 1865; Bishopscourt, County Kildare
- Died: 12 November 1914 (aged 49); Polygon Wood, Zonnebeke, Belgium
- Burial place: Menin Gate Memorial
- Military career
- Allegiance: United Kingdom
- Branch: British Army
- Service years: 1886–1914
- Rank: Brigadier-General
- Units: Royal Fusiliers; Protectorate Regiment; Irish Guards
- Commands: 1st Battalion, Irish Guards; 1st (Guards) Brigade
- Conflicts: Second Boer War; World War I †
- Awards: Victoria Cross

Brigadier-General Charles FitzClarence, VC (8 May 1865 – 12 November 1914) was an Anglo-Irish recipient of the Victoria Cross, the highest and most prestigious award for gallantry in the face of the enemy that can be awarded to British and Commonwealth forces.

== Early life ==
Charles FitzClarence was born in County Kildare, the son of Captain the Hon. George FitzClarence (15 April 1836 – 24 March 1894) and Maria Henrietta Scott (1841 – 27 July 1912). He had a twin brother named Edward. His paternal grandfather was the 1st Earl of Munster, an illegitimate son of William, Duke of Clarence (later King William IV of the United Kingdom).

He was commissioned as a subaltern, with the rank of lieutenant, into the 3rd (Militia) Battalion of the South Staffordshire Regiment in February 1885. In November 1886 he transferred to the Royal Fusiliers, and the Regular Army. His early career with his new regiment, however, was blighted by several bouts of illness and he spent much of his time in administrative and staff roles.

He was promoted to captain, on augmentation, in April 1898. In 1899 he volunteered to serve as a special service officer at Mafeking, South Africa and was given the duty of training a squadron of the Protectorate Regiment.

=== VC action ===
FitzClarence was 34 years old, and a captain in the Royal Fusiliers (City of London Regiment), British Army, during the Second Boer War when the following deeds took place for which he was awarded the Victoria Cross (VC):

On the 14th October, 1899, Captain FitzClarence went with his squadron of the Protectorate Regiment, consisting of only partially trained men, who had never been in action, to the assistance of an armoured train which had gone out from Mafeking. The enemy were in greatly superior numbers, and the squadron was for a time surrounded, and it looked as if nothing could save them from being shot down. Captain FitzClarence, however, by his personal coolness and courage inspired the greatest confidence in his men, and, by his bold and efficient handling of them, not only succeeded in relieving the armoured train, but inflicted a heavy defeat on the Boers, who lost 50 killed and a large number wounded, his own losses being 2 killed and 15 wounded. The moral effect of this blow had a very important bearing on subsequent encounters with the Boers.

On the 27th October, 1899, Captain FitzClarence led his squadron from Mafeking across the open, and made a night attack with the bayonet on one of the enemy's trenches. A hand-to-hand fight took place in the trench, while a heavy fire was concentrated on it from the rear. The enemy was driven out with heavy loss. Captain FitzClarence was the first man into the position and accounted for four of the enemy with his sword. The British lost 6 killed and 9 wounded. Captain FitzClarence was himself slightly wounded. With reference to these two actions, Major-General Baden-Powell states that had this Officer not shown an extraordinary spirit and fearlessness the attacks would have been failures, and we should have suffered heavy loss both in men and prestige.

On the 26th December, 1899, during the action at Game Tree, near Mafeking, Captain FitzClarence again distinguished himself by his coolness and courage, and was again wounded (severely through both legs).

His ferocity in battle earned him the enduring nickname 'The Demon'. He was a brigade major with the Rhodesian Brigade from August 1900.

He served in South Africa, being promoted from supernumerary captain to captain on augmentation in January 1901, until February 1901, at which point he transferred to the newly formed Irish Guards. He passed out from the Staff College, Camberley, which he entered as a student in January 1902, in January 1903, He then served as a brigade major of the 5th Infantry Brigade from April 1903 until 1906. Having been promoted to major in May 1904, he was promoted to lieutenant colonel and then succeeded George Colborne Nugent in command of the 1st Battalion, Irish Guards in July 1909. He had a reputation as a forward thinking soldier and took an innovative, albeit demanding, approach to training. It was noted he was "both loved and feared by his battalion".

He was promoted to colonel, dated March 1913, and in July went on to command the Irish Guards and regimental district again taking over Nugent.

== The Great War ==
Promoted to the temporary rank of brigadier general in August 1914, on 27 September he replaced Brigadier-General Ivor Maxse as commander of 1st Guards' Brigade with the British Expeditionary Force (BEF). He held this command until he was killed in action on 12 November 1914.

On 4 October 1914, whilst 1st Guards' Brigade was holding trenches opposite the German line at the River Aisne, he ordered the Coldstream Guards to carry out a night time raid against a German position known as 'Fish Hook Trench'. This was the first British trench raid of the First World War. The raid was led by Second Lieutenant Merton Beckwith-Smith and was a striking local success.

In October, FitzClarence had played a significant part in the First Battle of Ypres. Captain Valentine Williams, MC, writing in Blackwood's Magazine, described the action at Gheluvelt thus: "The Coldstream and Scots Guards' battalions of FitzClarence's brigade, in trenches north of Gheluvelt, suffered terribly in a German attack, delivered in a dense mist on the morning of the 27th along the Menin road. The odds against the British were crushing, for on that day some 24,000 Germans were arrayed against about 5,000 exhausted British troops. In two days the Scots Guards lost 10 officers and 370 men killed and wounded. But the result of the day's fighting was that the British line stood firm and unbroken, while the Germans had sustained enormous losses". Sir John French, in his Despatch published on 30 November 1914, described the fighting at this time as: "Perhaps the most important and decisive attack (except that of the Prussian Guard on the 10th November) made against the 1st Corps during the whole of its arduous experiences in the neighbourhood of Ypres."

Blackwood's Magazine for August 1917 carries an article describing FitzClarence's part. It was he who gave the order for the vital counter-attack of 31 October 1914. He "rallied the troops and directed the successful onslaught". Lt Col. E. B. Hankey, involved in the attack, said of FitzClarence: " ... by shoving us in at the time and place he did, the General saved the day."

On the morning of 11 November, the Prussian Guard attacked British troops along the Menin Road. Thirteen battalions of them came on, but only in three places did the Prussian Guard break through. On the following morning FitzClarence counter-attacked. The General himself decided to show his old regiment the way, and paid for the decision with his life. FitzClarence fell dead, and neither FitzClarence himself, nor Sir John French knew how well he had served his country at Gheluvelt.

In his Despatch of 20 November 1914, Sir John French said: "Another officer whose name was particularly mentioned to me was Brigadier-General FitzClarence, VC, commanding the 1st Guards' Brigade. He was unfortunately killed in the night attack of the 11th November. His loss will be severely felt".

His most recent biographer, Spencer Jones, describes FitzClarence as exemplifying "...the best aspects of the post-Boer War [British] officer class" due to his "courage, professionalism, natural leadership, and willingness to act upon his own initiative."

He was killed in action, aged 49, at Polygon Wood, Zonnebeke, Belgium, on 12 November 1914 whilst commanding the 1st (Guards) Brigade.

He is the highest-ranking officer inscribed on the Menin Gate Memorial in Ypres, commemorating those with no known grave.

== The medal ==
His VC is in the Lord Ashcroft VC Gallery in the Imperial War Museum, London.

== Family ==
On 20 April 1898, at the Citadel Church, Cairo, he married Violet Spencer-Churchill (13 June 1864 – 22 December 1941), daughter of Lord Alfred Spencer-Churchill and a granddaughter of the sixth Duke of Marlborough. The couple had two children:

- Edward Charles FitzClarence, 6th Earl of Munster (3 October 1899 – 15 November 1983)
- Joan Harriet FitzClarence (23 December 1901 – 6 January 1971)
