= Paardekraal Monument =

South African monument

Coordinates: 26°05′37″S 27°46′44″E

- Paardekraal-monument
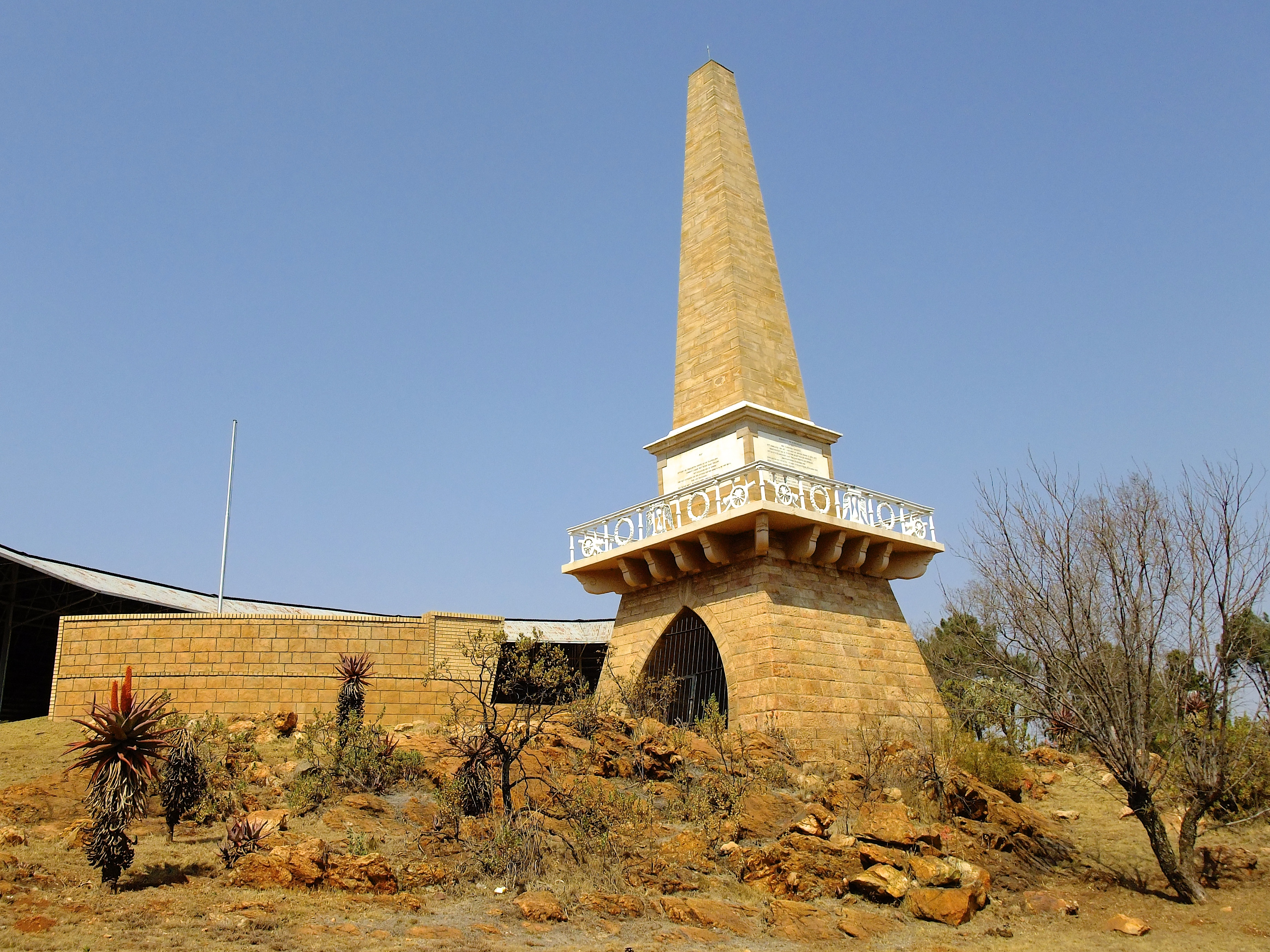
- Paardekraal Monument
- Interactive map of the Paardekraal Monument area

General information
- Status: Extant
- Type: Memorial
- Location: Paardekraal Drive, Kurgersdorp, South Africa
- Elevation: 1,715 m (5,627 ft)
- Construction started: 1890
- Opened: 16 December 1891
- Client: South African Republic

Height
- Height: 18.29 m (60.0 ft)

Design and construction
- Architect: Sytze Wierda
- Main contractor: W.Y. Veitch

The Paardekraal Monument is situated in Krugersdorp, South Africa. The monument commemorates the original site of vow made by Transvaal Boers on 13 December 1880, prior to the armed rebellion known as First Boer War, when they vowed to regain their independence from the British Empire. This earlier monument was a cairn made of thousands of stones representing the gathered burgers' vow. This official monument enclosed the original stone cairn and was built in 1890 by the South African Republic (ZAR) to commemorate their independence from Great Britain.

== Background ==
During January 1877, a small British force of mounted policemen led by Sir Theophilus Shepstone crossed into the South African Republic and based himself in its capital, Pretoria. It was the British government's intention to stamp its control over the Cape and Natal Colonies as well as the Orange Free State and the South African Republic and form a confederation of states. Another reason was the South African Republic's attempt to finance a railway to Delagoa Bay, bypassing the economic stranglehold by the British colonies in the Cape and Natal, but the ZAR was essentially bankrupt. Openly Shepstone was to gain support from the people in the ZAR to the British plan but his orders were to annex no matter what the views were. Shepstone would play on the emotions of the people, as the inhabitants were not united and there was a dislike of their president, Thomas François Burgers, especially his handling of the problems with the Pedi. Shepstone annexed the ZAR at 11 am on 12 April 1877 as a British Colony and as its administrator and its old president left the Transvaal for Holland. So ended the 1852 Sand River Convention that had originally given the Boers their independence.

Shepstone would then go on and organise a twenty-month campaign against the Pedi people which ended in their defeat in November 1879. Paul Kruger would lead two failed delegations to London in 1877 and 1878 to regain their independence. Meanwhile, in the Transvaal, the Boers' unity returned by making use of church meetings and social gatherings to rebuild themselves into a united force that could use military force in the future. Religion was the binding force based on a strong belief that God had given them their language, the land and control over the black population. The British tried to arrest leaders and ban gatherings but did not have the manpower to stop them. In 1880, three years after the annexation, the Transvaal administration now under Sir Owen Lanyon, was still trying to improve the colony's tax revenue. The Boer inhabitants were never willing to pay taxes even under their own administration. In that year, a Boer by the surname of Bezuidenhout, refused to pay a tax bill of £27 5s and had his wagon confiscated and was put up for auction to pay the bill. Piet Cronje and his armed friends interrupted the auction and removed the wagon, returning it to its owner. Lanyon, regarding it as a rebellion, again ordered arrests but had no manpower to carry it out.

A mass gathering was proposed for 8 January 1881 at Paardekraal (now Krugersdorp) for the Transvaal Boers where a decision would be made as to how they should proceed, if at all to independence, but this date was brought forward to 8 December 1880. From that date until 13 December 1880, 8,000 to 10,000 Boer men, women and children eventually gathered on sloping ground in Paardekraal. The meeting declared the restoration of the old Volksraad, and the government of the republic to be managed by three men, Paul Kruger, Piet Joubert and Marthinus Pretorius. A proclamation declaring independence was drawn-up by Eduard Bok and Dr. E. J. P. Jorissen stating the reasons for the actions in a thirty-eight clause document. It declared their independence from British rule and the resumption of the South African Republic on 13 December 1880. After reading of the oath below, 5,000 to 6,000 men acknowledged this oath by placing a stone on the hill-side that formed the original stone cairn.

In the presence of Almighty God, the searcher of all hearts, and prayerfully waiting on His gracious help and pity, we, burghers of the South African Republic, have solemnly agreed, as we do hereby agree, to make a holy covenant for us and for our children, which we confirm with a solemn oath. Fully forty years ago our fathers fled from the Cape Colony in order to become a free and independent people. Those forty years have been forty years of pain and suffering. We established Natal, the Orange Free State and the South African Republic, and three times the English government has trampled on our liberty and dragged to the ground our flag, which our fathers had baptised with their blood and tears. As by a thief in the night has our republic been stolen from us. We neither may nor can endure this. It is God's will, and is required of us by duty to our fathers and by love to our children, that we should hand over intact to our children the legacy of the fathers. For that purpose it is that we have here come together and give each other the right hand as men and brethren, solemnly promising to remain faithful to our country and our people, and with our eyes fixed on God, to cooperate until death for the restoration of the freedom of our republic. So help us Almighty God.

The first shots of the war that became known as the First Boer War began on the 16 December 1880 in Potchefstroom. The Boers had attempted to have proclamation printed in the town but were fired on by British troops. The first real conflict between British and Boer began on 20 December 1880 as the Battle of Bronkhorstspruit when Lanyon attempted to bring troops to Pretoria. The First Boer War was short, ending in March 1881 with the defeat of the British army.

The first commemoration took place at the cairn in 1881 as a Volksfees, to celebrate the South African Republic's independence, gained from the British Empire after their defeat at the Battle of Majuba Hill and a peace treaty signed in August 1881, known as the Pretoria Convention. But more importantly, a religious thanksgiving to God and for the fulfilment of the vow. The ZAR's Volksraad declared that a commemoration at the cairns would take place every five years on the 16 December.

== Monument ==
Land was donated to the government in 1886, up to 100 m from the site of the cairn, from the farm owned by a M.W. Pretorius. He had lease parts of his farm to gold prospectors who were searching for the continuation of the Main Reef of the Witwatersrand Gold Rush, which had its origins to the east in Johannesburg and did not want this sacred memorial site disturbed. In 1889, the local Landrost Human, proposed to the South African Republic that a formal monument, in the form of an obelisk, be built on the cairn site.

The monument was built in white stone, sourced from the area and would stand at a height of 60 ft. It would have an opening underneath the base of the monuments, with a grated iron opening, storing the remains of the original cairn. It would stand on the crest of a hill, similar to other Afrikaner monuments. It was designed by the architect Sytze Wierda and built by W.Y. Veitch. The monument was officially opened by Paul Kruger on 16 December 1891. During the occupation of the Transvaal by the British forces during the Second Boer War, original cairn stones in the gated chamber were looted by British soldiers and thrown into the Vaal River. The monument became a heritage listed site on 17 April 1936.

== Gallery ==
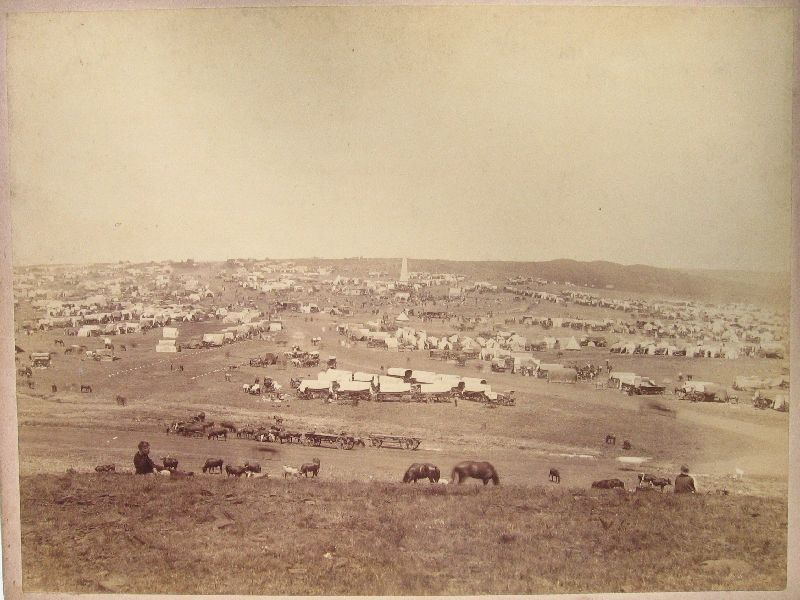
Gathering at the Monmument

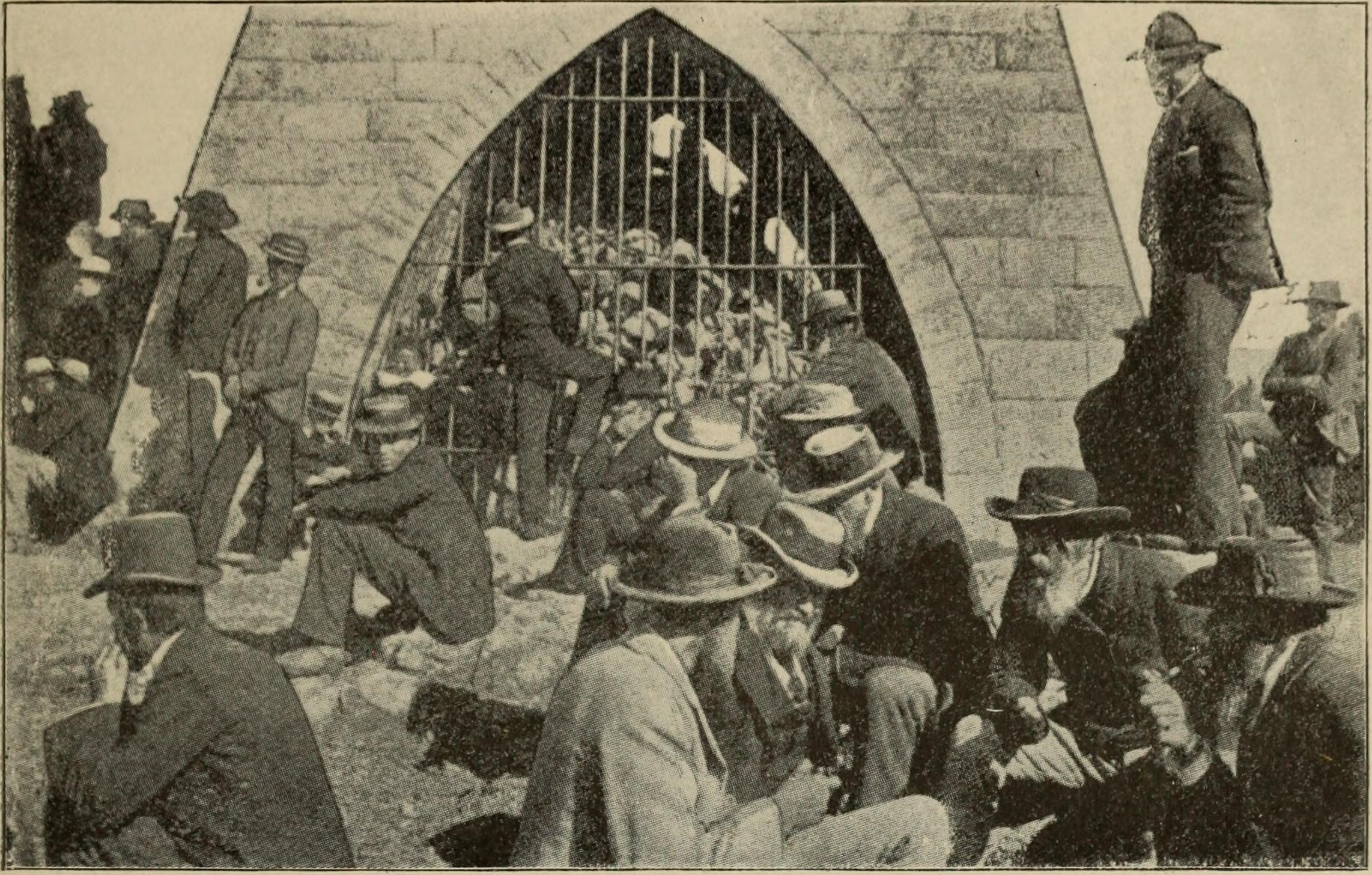
Gated base with original cairn stones

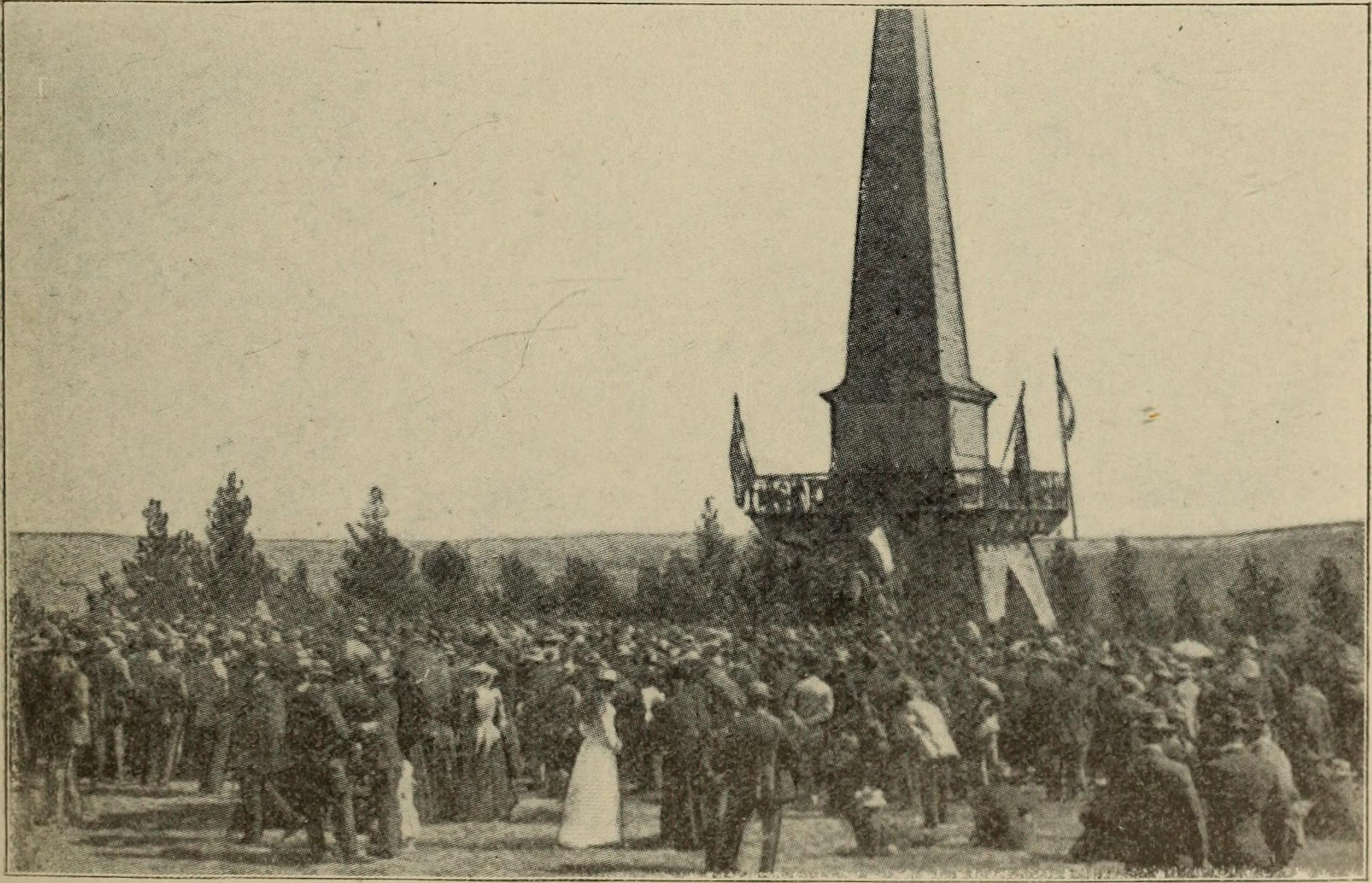
Gathering in 1899
