= Leliefontein =

Leliefontein may refer to:

- Leliefontein, Northern Cape
- Battle of Leliefontein, which took place south of Belfast, Mpumalanga, South Africa
- Leliefontein massacre, in the Northern Cape, South Africa
