= 1965 Durban rail accident =

1965 South African train disaster

1965 Durban rail disaster

Details
- Date: 4 October 1965
- Location: Effingham Road, around 16 kilometres from Durban, South Africa
- Country: South Africa
- Owner: South African Railways

Statistics
- Trains: 1
- Passengers: c. 1500
- Crew: at least 2
- Deaths: 87 black passengers; lynched white signalman
- Injured: 130-200
- During the aftermath protest (against apartheid) emerged

On 4 October 1965, during the Apartheid in South Africa, a passenger train of the South African Railways with up to 1500 black commuters onboard derailed, killing 87 of them.

As ‘revenge’ the passengers lynched a signalman and beat up another railwayman. Thousands of local black people came together in a protest march towards the disaster scene. It was estimated 100,000 attended the funeral of the 87 black workers.

It was the deadliest railway accident in South Africa.

== Background ==
The disaster occurred in South Africa, during the Apartheid system of institutionalised racial segregation that existed in South Africa where black people were suppressed. It was generally known that transportation of black African on trains was poor. They were transported in old wooden trains with far too many people per car.

== The accident ==
On 4 October 1965 a crowded passenger train with 11 jam-packed coaches of the South African Railways 5:28 with 1200-1500 black commuters on board were transported from port city Durban station back to their township KwaMashu, South Africa. At Effingham Road, around 16 kilometres from Durban, the last three wagons derailed and overturned. Both the conductor and driver stated that they heard a grinding sound and the train overturned. An eyewitness stated he saw “the electric unit at the tail end topple over. With it came the train's last passenger compartment, bouncing like a toy over the jagged fill of the roadbed”. During the next 1.5 minutes three more coaches jumped one-by-one off the track.

== Aftermath ==
=== Rescue operation and victims ===
Victims were scattered over 300 meters along the railway line. Another hundreds of passengers were trapped between the debris. Police, nurses, doctors and first-aiders were called over the radio to go to the disaster site. Over forty ambulances were involved in the rescue operation and brought the injured people to Durban. Rescue teams searched for survivors. 81 passengers were directly killed, while some sources wrongly stating 150 casualties. The death toll rose to 84 and days later to 87 passengers after injured people died in hospital. There were 130-200 injured passengers. The disaster was at the time the deadliest rail disaster of South Africa.

=== Lynching and protest ===
One of the survivors shouted after the accident “It's the Europeans who planned this murder of our brothers”. The white 25-years old signalman Walter Wilfred “Wally” Hartslief ran from the nearby train station to the disaster scene to help. When he arrived at the scene, minutes after the disaster, an angry crowd of around 100 people held him accountable for the disaster and lynched him. Another railwayman was also beaten up. He was seriously injured, was hospitalized but survived. Walter Wilfred Hartslief was 25 years old and was married. 2000 black Africans gathered for a protest march to the disaster scene. Because of that the Durban police sent additional reinforcements.

==== Court case ====
In August 1966 the Durban court convicted three people for the murder on Hartslief. The president considered it proven that the three were part of the group of approximately 100 people who had attacked Harstlief, under the assumption that he was the driver of the train. Four were acquitted due to lack of evidence.

=== Funeral ===
On 9 October 1965 the 87 black victims were buried at KwaMashu. The number of people at the funeral was expected by the authorities of Natal to be 100,000. After the lynching and protest march, the police of Durban was present to avoid disturbances.

Hartslief was also buried. His grave stone is still visible.

== See also ==
- Durban riots
- 1973 Durban strikes
