= List of massacres in South Africa =

The following is a list of massacres that have occurred in South Africa (numbers may be approximate).

== List ==
| Name | Date | Location | Casualties | Notes |
|---|---|---|---|---|
| Battle of Salt River | 1 March 1510 | Cape of Good Hope | 64 Portuguese seamen | The Battle of Salt River was a small military engagement between the crew of a Portuguese fleet led by Francisco de Almeida and the indigenous Goringhaiqua Khoikhoi, a military encounter between Europeans and indigenous people in what would later become South Africa. The battle resulted in a massacre of Portuguese forces and a victory for the Khoikhoi. |
| The Mfecane / Difaqane | 1818–1828 | Highveld and Natal south of the Tugela | 1,000,000–2,500,000 black Africans | The mfecane / difaqane was a period of mass migration and warfare caused by the political changes that occurred during the reign of King Shaka. The word "mfecane" was invented by Eric A. Walker in 1928 and the theory is increasingly disputed by scholars. |
| The Janse van Rensburg Trek massacre | 1836 | Inhambane (Djinjispruit, Limpoporiver, Mozambique) | 49 Voortrekkers | Ordered by Manukosi, a chieftain. Johannes Jacobus (Lang Hans) Janse van Rensburg, leader of one of the early Voortrekker treks and his entire trek, except two children saved by a Zulu warrior, were killed by an impi of Manukosi. Included in the party was Nicholaas Balthasar Prinsloo, who was a Slagtersnek rebel, his wife, Petronella Maria Krugel/Kruger and their family. |
| Piet Retief Delegation massacre | 1838-02-06 | Hloma mabuto, uMgungundlovu, Natal also known as kwaMatiwane Hill | 100 Boers and servants | Ordered by Dingane, a Zulu chieftain. The place, at kwaMatiwane Hill, was a site where Dingane had thousands of other enemies executed. Voortrekker leader Piet Retief was killed last. The treaty handing over a tract of land to the Voortrekkers signed between Dingane and Piet Retief two days before the massacre was later found on Retief's remains. A copy of the original still exists. The treaty led to the establishment of the Natalia Republic in 1838 which stretched from the Tugela River to present-day Port St. Johns. |
| Weenen massacre | 1838-02-17 | Doringkop, Bloukrans River, Moordspruit, Rensburgspruit and other sites around present-day Weenen, KwaZulu-Natal | 532 (282 Boer men, women and children, and 250 Khoikhoi and Basuto) | Amongst those killed were Joachim Johannes Prinsloo, (Acquitted Slagtersnek rebel) and his wife Martha Louisa Prinsloo. The Piet Retief Massacre and the Weenen Massacre was the motivation for the Voortrekkers to confront the Zulus in battle on 16 December 1838 when 470 Voortrekkers fought against an estimated 15,000 to 21,000 Zulus; which the Voortrekkers won. The battle is known as the Battle of Blood River. |
| Derdepoort massacre | 1899-11-25 | Derdepoort, North-West, Transvaal | 2 Boer women were killed, and 17 women and children taken captive | On 25 November 1899 some of the Bechuanaland Kgatla, under Lentshwe and in alliance with the British under Colonel G. L. Holdsworth, attacked a Boer laager on the Bechuanaland border of the Transvaal. Two women were killed, and 17 women and children taken captive. |
| Leliefontein massacre | 1902-01-31 | Northern Cape, South Africa | 35 | 35 Khoikhoi executed by Boer forces under Manie Maritz as reprisal for an attack on his troops by pro-British locals. |
| Bulhoek massacre | 1921-05-24 | Ntabelanga, Queenstown, Eastern Cape | 163 | Enoch Mgijima led the gathering to defend their land against a Union of South Africa police force led by Colonel Johan Davey and General Koos van der Venter. |
| Rand Rebellion | 1922-03-08 to 1922-03-18 | Johannesburg, Transvaal | 153 | The rebellion started as a strike by white mineworkers on 28 December 1921 and shortly thereafter, it became an open rebellion against the state. Subsequently, the workers, who had armed themselves, took over the cities of Benoni and Brakpan, and the Johannesburg suburbs of Fordsburg and Jeppe. Several communists and syndicalists, the latter including the strike leaders Percy Fisher and Harry Spendiff, were killed as the rebellion was quelled by state forces. The rebellion was eventually crushed by "considerable military firepower and at the cost of over 200 lives". |
| Durban Riot | 1949-01-13 to 1949-01-14 | Durban | 142 | The Durban riot was an anti-Indian riot predominantly by Zulus targeting Indians in Durban, South Africa in January 1949. The riot resulted in the massacre of mostly poor Indians. In total 142 people died in the riot and another 1,087 people were injured. It also led to the destruction of 58 shops, 247 dwellings and one factory. |
| Mayibuye Uprising | 1952-11-08 | Galeshewe, Kimberley | 13 | 78 wounded. The Mayibuye Uprising was a sequence of protests and demonstrations, led by the ANC, South African Indian Congress and the African People's Organisation that took place around No.2 Location Galeshewe, in Kimberley, on 7–8 November 1952. |
| Sharpeville massacre | 1960-03-21 | Sharpeville | 69 | South African police shot down black protesters. 180 wounded |
| Soweto uprising | 1976-06-16 | Soweto | 176-700+ | Police shot at young black students who were protesting against the use of Afrikaans in schools. |
| Church Street bombing | 1983-05-20 | Outside Nedbank Plein, Church Street West, Pretoria, Transvaal at 16:28 | 19 | 217 wounded. The attack was carried out by a special task force of the ANC's Umkhonto we Sizwe led by Aboobaker Ismail. These units were approved by Oliver Tambo, ANC president, in 1979. At the time of the attack they reported to Joe Slovo, head of personnel. Tambo approved and gave permission for the operation. |
| Egerton railway station bus boycott massacre | 4 August 1983 | Ciskei, Mdantsane | 11 | |
| Durban car bomb | 1984-04-03 | Durban. Close to the offices of the South African Indian Council. | 5 | 27 wounded. |
| Vaal uprising | 3 September 1984 -June 1986 | Vaal Triangle | 1,600 | Popular revolt in black townships |
| Langa massacre | 1985-03-21 | Uitenhage, Eastern Cape | 35 killed | The South African Police shot at a crowd of funeral-goers stopped by them on Maduna Road in Uitenhage, on the anniversary of the Sharpeville Massacre. The first shot was at a 15-year-old boy on a bicycle who joined the crowd from a side street and lifted his hand in a Black Power salute |
| Pebco Three murders | 1985-05-08 | Port Elizabeth | 3 | Abduction and murder of three black South African anti-apartheid activists by members of the South African security police. |
| Landmines planted on farm roads | 1985 to 1987 | On farm roads across South Africa. | 23–25 | At least 150 landmines were planted by Umkhonto we Sizwe. |
| Cradock Four | 27 June 1985 | town of Cradock, Eastern Cape | 4 | Abduction and murder of four anti-Apartheid activists by South African security police |
| Duncan Village Massacre | 1985-08-11 | Duncan Village, East London, Eastern Cape | 19 killed | 138 wounded |
| Trojan Horse Incident | 1985-10-15 | Belgravia Road, Athlone, Cape Town | 3 killed | Three youths are killed and several others were injured. when South African security force members, hiding in the back of an unmarked truck, ambush and open fire on a stone-throwing crowd in the township of Athlone, Cape Town. The incident is captured by an international television crew and broadcast across the world. |
| Queenstown Massacre | 1985-11-17 | Queenstown, Eastern Cape | 14 killed | 22 wounded |
| Amanzimtoti bombing | 1985-12-23 | Amanzimtoti | 5 civilians, including 3 children | Forty were injured when MK cadre Andrew Sibusiso Zondo detonated an explosive in a rubbish bin at a shopping centre. In a submission to the Truth and Reconciliation Commission (TRC), the ANC stated that Zondo's act, though "understandable" as a response to a recent South African Defence Force raid in Lesotho, was not in line with ANC policy. Zondo was subsequently executed. |
| Gugulethu Seven murders | 1986-03-03 | Gugulethu | 7 | Seven black men are killed in a confrontation with police in Gugulethu |
| Lowveld massacre | 1986-03-11 | Kabokweni | 4 killed and a few disappeared never to be found. | The Lowveld massacre was an incident that occurred on 11 March 1986 at Kabokweni, in the then KaNgwane bantustan (now part of Mpumalanga province) when security forces opened fire on thousands of young people who had gathered outside the magistrate's court to protest during the trial of their fellow students. |
| Magoo's Bar bomb. Durban beach-front bombing | 1986-06-14 | Durban | 3 killed | 69 wounded. An uMkhonto we Sizwe (MK) cell, led by Robert McBride, planted a bomb in a car outside the popular "Why Not Magoo's Bar", with the belief that the place was frequented by security branch police. |
| 1986 massacre | 1986-08-26 | White City | 20-25 killed, over 60 injured | The South African Information Bureau claimed that police opened fire on two occasions, one after a grenade had been tossed at police and wounded four policemen. Residents said that the fighting started when local officials sought to evict tenants who had been refusing to pay their rents for two months as part of a mass boycott. |
| Johannesburg Magistrate's Court bombing | 1987-05-20 | Johannesburg, Transvaal | 3 killed, 4 injured | Limpet mine attack, then car bomb attack half an hour later. |
| Oshakati bomb blast | 1988-02-19 | Oshakati, Ovamboland, South West Africa (now Oshana Region, Namibia) | 27 | Car bombing of the Barclays bank. SWAPO, the main Namibian liberation organization, and the South African police were both blamed by each other, 70 wounded |
| Comair Flight 206 bombing | 1 March 1988 | Germiston, near Johannesburg International Airport | 17 | Comair Flight 206, an Embraer 110 Bandeirante, crashed in Johannesburg, killing all 17 occupants. One source suggests that this incident was caused by an explosive device, carried by a passenger employed as a mineworker who had recently taken out a substantial insurance policy |
| Strijdom Square massacre | 1988-11-5 | Pretoria, Transvaal | 8 killed, 16 injured | Barend Strydom, acting alone, went on a shooting spree in the Pretoria city center. He specifically targeted black persons. He was disarmed by a black member of the public whilst reloading. |
| Trust Feed massacre | 1988-12-3 | Trust Feed, Natal | 11 | Captain Brian Mitchell ordered South African Police officers to shoot and kill a group of people, thought to be United Democratic Front supporters, attending a funeral vigil. The victims were in fact Inkatha supporters. |
| Motherwell car bomb | 1989-12-14 | Motherwell, Eastern Cape | 4 | Killing with car bomb of four police officers |
| Boipatong massacre | 1992-06-17 | Boipatong | 45 | The attack on township residents was carried out by armed men from the steelworks residence KwaMadala Hostel, which was located roughly 1 km from the township. Forty-five people died and several other people were maimed. The attackers were supporters of the Inkatha Freedom Party (IFP), a rival party of the African National Congress (ANC). |
| Bisho massacre | 1992-09-07 | Bisho, Ciskei | 29 | Twenty-eight African National Congress supporters and one soldier were shot dead by the Ciskei Defence Force during a protest march when they attempted to enter Bisho (now renamed to Bhisho) to demand the reincorporation of Ciskei into South Africa during the final years of apartheid. |
| Saint James Church massacre | 1993-07-25 | Kenilworth, Cape Town | 11 | The Saint James Church massacre was a massacre that was perpetrated by four terrorists of the Azanian People's Liberation Army (APLA). Eleven members of the congregation were killed and an additional 58 members were wounded. |
| Heidelberg Tavern massacre | 1993-12-30 | Observatory, Cape Town | 4 | During the years of apartheid, Observatory was one of the few de facto 'grey' suburbs where all races lived together. On the evening of 30 December 1993, three men entered a popular student venue on Station Road, called the Heidelberg Tavern and opened fire, killing four people and injuring five. The three APLA operatives—Humphrey Luyanda Gqomfa, Vuyisile Brian Madasi and Zola Prince Mabala—were convicted in November 1994 for what became known as the Heidelberg Massacre. |
| Queenstown Prison fire | 21 March 1994 | Queenstown, Eastern Cape Province | 21 | Twenty-one prisoners are killed in a cell fire at the Queenstown Prison after they set fire to their cells. |
| Shell House massacre | 1994-03-28 | Johannesburg | 19–53 | ANC security guards opened fire, killing nineteen people. Twenty thousand Inkatha Freedom Party (IFP) supporters marched to Shell House in protest against the 1994 elections that the IFP was intending to boycott. |
| Bree Street taxi rank bombing | 1994-04-24 | Johannesburg | 21 killed, over 100 injured | A car bomb was placed at a busy public transport hub in the Johannesburg city centre by members of the AWB |
| Germiston taxi rank bombing | 1994-04-25 | Germiston | 10 killed, 8 injured | A pipe bomb was placed inside a trailer and driven to the taxi rank in Germiston and was detonated at around 10am in the morning by members of the AWB |
| 1996 Shoprite bombing | 24 December 1996 | Shoprite, Worcester | 4 | white-supremacist terrorist attack |
| Planet Hollywood bombing | 1998-08-25 | V&A Waterfront, Cape Town | 2 | 26 Wounded |
| Sizzlers massacre | 2003-01-20 | Sea Point, Cape Town | 9, 1 injured | The victims were murdered at a gay massage parlour on Graham Road by Adam Roy Woest and Trevor Basil Theys. |
| Mutebu family murder | 23 May 2005 | Middelburg, Mpumalanga | 4 | Johannes van Rooyen and Dumisani Makhubela a pair of serial killers kills 4 members of the Mutebu family because they falsely believed the family had won the lottery. |
| 2008 Skierlik shooting | 2008-01-14 | Skierlik, near Swartruggens, North West | 4 | The teenage Afrikaner Johan Nel opened fire in Skierlik, a township near Swartruggens, killing 4 black people and injuring 8 in a racially motivated attack. |
| May 2008 South Africa riots | 2008-05-12 | Gauteng, Durban, Mpumalanga | 62 | Attacks on foreign nationals |
| Marikana massacre | 2012-08-16 | Lonmin Mine, Marikana | 34-47 | The Marikana massacre was the single most lethal use of force by South African security forces against civilians since 1960. The shootings have been described as a massacre in the South African media and have been compared to the Sharpeville massacre in 1960. Controversy emerged after it was discovered that most of the victims were shot in the back, and many victims were shot far from police lines. |
| Life Esidimeni deaths | 2015 - 2016 | Gauteng | 144 to date; 62 still not accounted for. Eight still missing as of 11 March 2020. | 1,300 psychiatric patients were relocated from Life Esidimeni centres to mainly unlicensed NGOs by order of the Gauteng Department of Health. The inquest concluded in November 2023. This tragic incident marks "one of South Africa's most significant human rights violations." Many of the victims died of "neglect, starvation and dehydration.". "The Life Esidimeni inquest has concluded that former Gauteng MEC for health Qedani Mahlangu and the former head of Gauteng’s mental health services, Makgabo Manamela, were responsible for the deaths of some of the patients" |
| Van Breda murders | 27 January 2015 | Stellenbosch, Western Cape | 3 | Henri Christo van Breda murdered his parents and brother and severely wounded his sister. |
| 2015 South African xenophobic riots | 11 April 2015 | Durban and Johannesburg | 7 | Several South Africans attacked foreigners in a xenophobic attack in Durban, which extended to some parts of Johannesburg |
| 2019 Johannesburg riots | 1–8 September 2019 | Johannesburg | 12 | About 12 people were killed in the xenophobic riots against foreigners |
| Gugulethu massacre | 2020-11-2 | Gugulethu, Cape Town | 8 killed. Seven of the nine victims died on scene (3 women and 4 men) whilst an eight victim died later in hospital. | Eight people were killed at a house. The shooting was reported to be related to a gang conflict between the Gupta and Boko Haram street gangs or drug-related. |
| Mount Ayliff Christmas Day Massacre | 25 December 2020 | Mount Ayliff, Eastern Cape | 7-9 | A dispute over minibus taxi routes between competing taxi routes was reported to have led to the shooting on 25 December 2020. The following day six suspects were arrested. It took place in the village of Mount Ayliff in the Eastern Cape province of South Africa and resulted in the death of between seven and nine people. At least six people were reported injured in the attack. It was reported that most of the dead were from the nearby village of Nokhatshile. The South African National Defense Force was called in to assist the police in the search for suspects as they had escaped into the surrounding area following the incident. The following day six suspects, injured in the incident, were arrested. Seven suspects appeared before the Mount Ayliff Magistrates Court on charges relating to the incident on 28 December 2020. |
| 2021 South African unrest | 9 - 18 July 2021 | KwaZulu-Natal and Gauteng Provinces | 354 | "The 2021 South African unrest, also known as the July 2021 riots,[23] the Zuma unrest[24] or Zuma riots,[25] was a wave of civil unrest that occurred in South Africa's KwaZulu-Natal and Gauteng provinces from 9 to 18 July 2021, sparked by the imprisonment of former President Jacob Zuma for contempt of court.[21]: 52 Resulting protests against the incarceration triggered wider rioting and looting"[27][28] The unrest began in the province of KwaZulu-Natal on the evening of 9 July,[29] and spread to the province of Gauteng on the evening of 11 July,[30][31] and was the worst violence that South Africa had experienced since the end of Apartheid.[32] Zuma was taken into custody after declining to testify at the Zondo Commission, an inquiry into allegations of corruption during his term as president from 2009 to 2018.[33] The Constitutional Court reserved judgment on Zuma's application to rescind his sentence on 12 July 2021.[34][35][36] The South African government reported that 354 people had died in the riots.[21] As of 12 August 2022, 5,500 people had been arrested, in connection with the unrest.[22]" |
| 2022 Soweto shooting | 2022-07-9 | Soweto | 16 people were killed and 7 injured. | A group of men armed with rifles and a pistol arrived and opened fire on patrons in the tavern. The perpetrators fled the scene and were not apprehended. |
| 2022 Pietermaritzburg shooting | 2022-07-9 | Pietermaritzburg | 4 people were killed and 8 injured. | Two men entered the Sweetwaters tavern and opened fire, before fleeing in a car. Two days later police arrested four suspects. |
| 2023 Gqeberha mass shooting | 29 January 2023 | KwaZakhele, Gqeberha, Eastern Cape | 8 | On 29 January 2023 a mass shooting happened at a private home in the KwaZakhele township of Gqeberha. The two gunmen opened fire on the guests who were attending a birthday party before fleeing the scene, resulting in the death of eight people. Initially, seven people were declared dead at the scene with an additional four people injured. One of the four injured people later died of their injuries in a hospital. The South African Police Service stated that the motive for the attack was unknown. |
| 2024 Lusikisiki shootings | Friday night, 28 September 2024 | Ngobozana Village, Lusikisiki, Eastern Cape | 18 people shot and killed and 5 injured | Unidentified gunmen carried out two mass shootings at a lawn outside two homesteads in the early hours of the morning and shot and killed 17 victims. A critically injured victim died later in hospital. 5 victims survived the attack, including a 2 month old baby. The attackers are still at large. The majority of the victims are women. |
| 2024 Godini shooting | 6 October 2024 | Godini village, Qumbu, Eastern Cape | 6 dead and 4 injured | Eight unidentified gunmen armed with rifles and handguns opened fire on a group of Community Policing Forum community patrollers, killing six people and injuring four others. |
| 2026 Philippi massacre | Saturday, 17 January 2026 | Mthawelanga Street, in the Better Life section, Marikana informal settlement, Philippi East, Cape Town, Western Cape | 7 (some report say 8) people shot and killed | Unidentified gunmen carried out the attack. The victims are men believed to be between the ages of 20 and 30. The victims sustained multiple gunshot wounds and some of the bodies were partially burned when the structure was deliberately set alight. |
| 2026 Jumpers shooting | Tuesday night, 9 June 2026 | Jumpers Informal Settlement in the Cleveland suburb of Johannesburg | 12 people shot and killed | |

== See also ==
- Racism in South Africa
- Political assassinations in post-apartheid South Africa
- Internal resistance to apartheid
- Herstigte Nasionale Party
