= Nathan Erasmus =

South African judge (born 9 July 1961)

The Honourable Nathan Erasmus

Judge of the High Court
- Division: Western Cape
- Incumbent
- Assumed office 29 January 2001
- Appointed by: Thabo Mbeki

Personal details
- Born: Nathan Charles Erasmus; 9 July 1961 (age 65)
- Education: University of the Western Cape

Nathan Charles Erasmus (born 9 July 1961) is a South African judge in the Western Cape Division of the High Court. He has served as presiding officer over some of South Africa's most infamous cases such as the murder trial of gangster Rashied Staggie and the human trafficking and kidnapping trial related to Joshlin Smith.

== Early life and education ==
Nathan Charles Erasmus was born on 9 July 1961 in Kraaifontein, Cape Town, South Africa. He matriculated from Elswood Senior Secondary School in 1978. He studied law at the University of the Western Cape and earned his B Juris degree in 1983. In 1984 he began work as prosecutor and a magistrate in the Department of Justice. He earned his LLB degree in 1989. In 1991 he was admitted as an advocate, joining the Cape Bar in 1994 after a pupillage under Justice Siraj Desai. On 29 January 2001 he was appointed a judge in the Western Cape Division of the High Court.

== Career ==
Since his appointment as a judge of the High Court, he has presided over a number of high-profile cases.

- Mansoer Leggett Pagad Hitman Conviction (2001)
- Sizzlers massacre Trial (2004)
- Heinrich van Rooyen Double Murder Case (2005 – 2008)
- Rashied Staggie Murder Trial (2007)
- Erasmus Commission (2008)
- Nafiz Modak Trial (2021–present)
- Zandile Mafe arson case (2022–2023)
- Joshlin Smith Trial (S v Appollis JR & Others) (2024–2025)

== Personal life ==
Erasmus is married to Charlene Erasmus (nee Baatjes) and has two children. He enjoys cycling and golf.
