= Derdepoort massacre =

Massacre in the Second Boer War

- Part of the Second Boer War
- Location: 24°38′33″S 26°24′13″E; Derdepoort, South African Republic
- Date: 25 November 1899
- Deaths: 2 women
- Injuries: 17 women and children were captured
- Perpetrator: Bechuanaland Kgatla of Chief Lentshwe

The Derdepoort massacre occurred on 25 November 1899 at Derdepoort, situated on the South African Republic's border with the British Bechuanaland Protectorate. Some of the Bechuanaland Kgatla, under their chief Lentshwe and in alliance with the British under Colonel G. L. Holdsworth, attacked a Boer laager (wagon fort). Two women were killed, and 17 women and children taken captive.

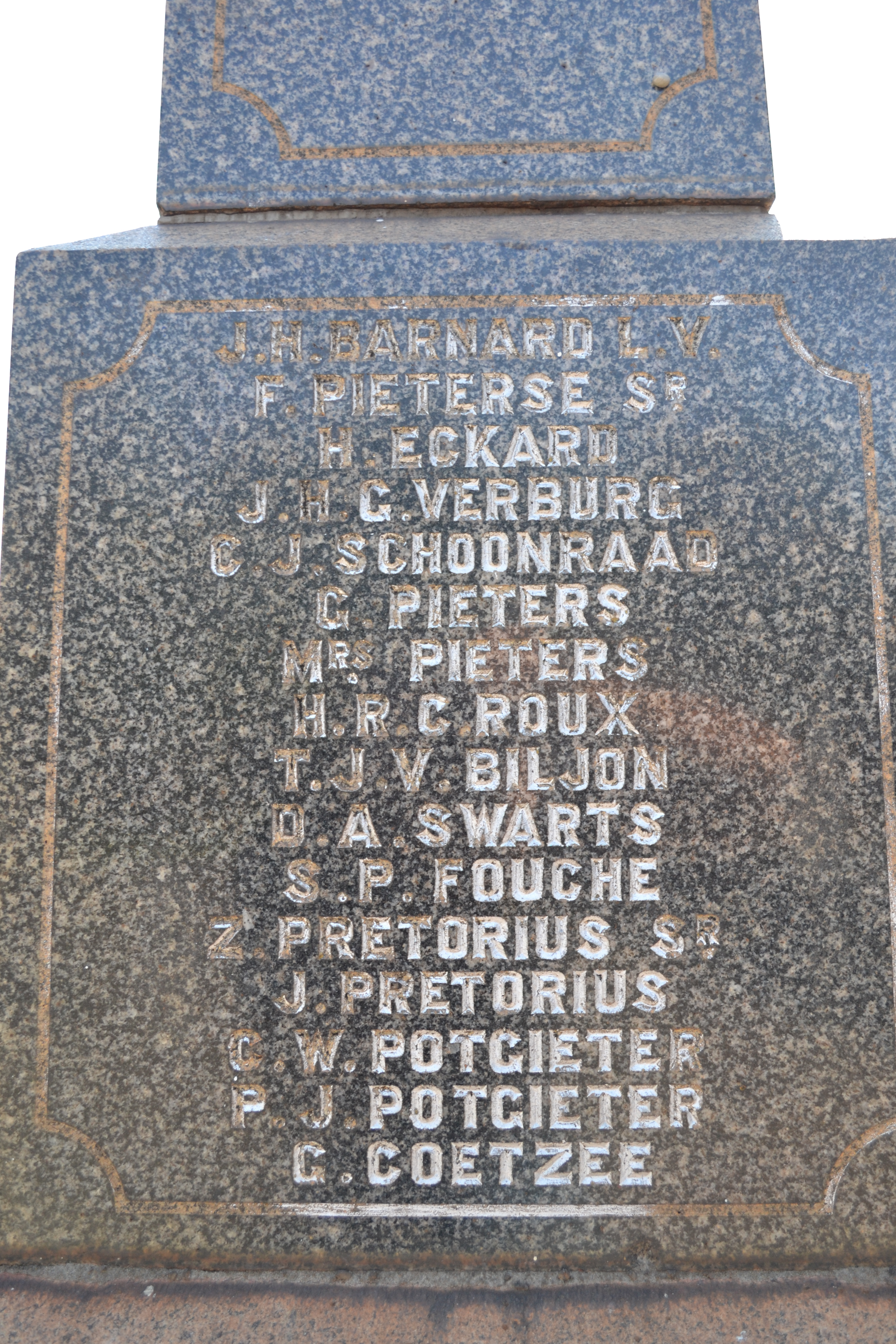
Names (32) recorded on the Derdepoort Memorial in Rustenburg

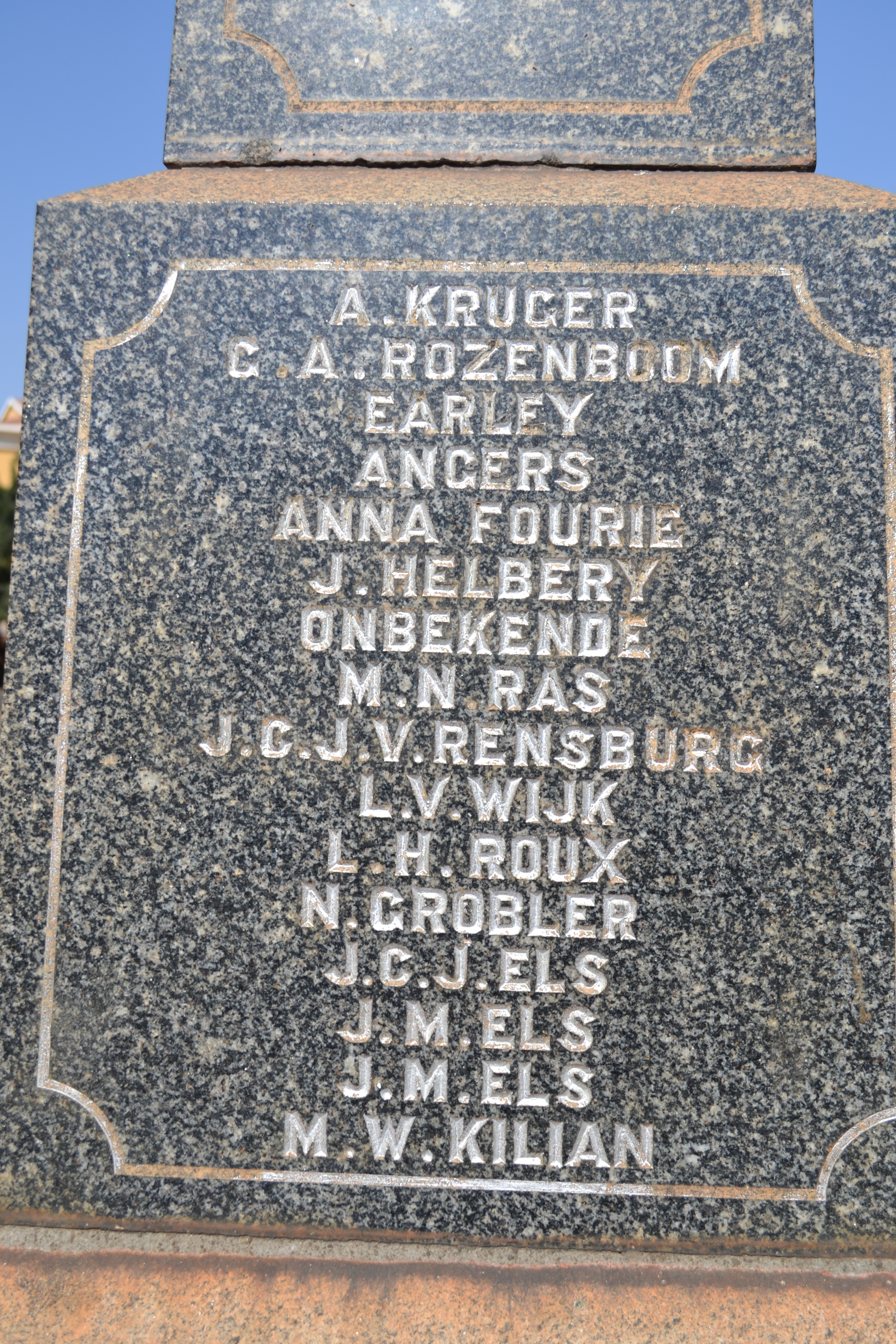
ditto

== See also ==
- List of massacres in South Africa
