= Drakenstein Correctional Centre =

Prison in South Africa

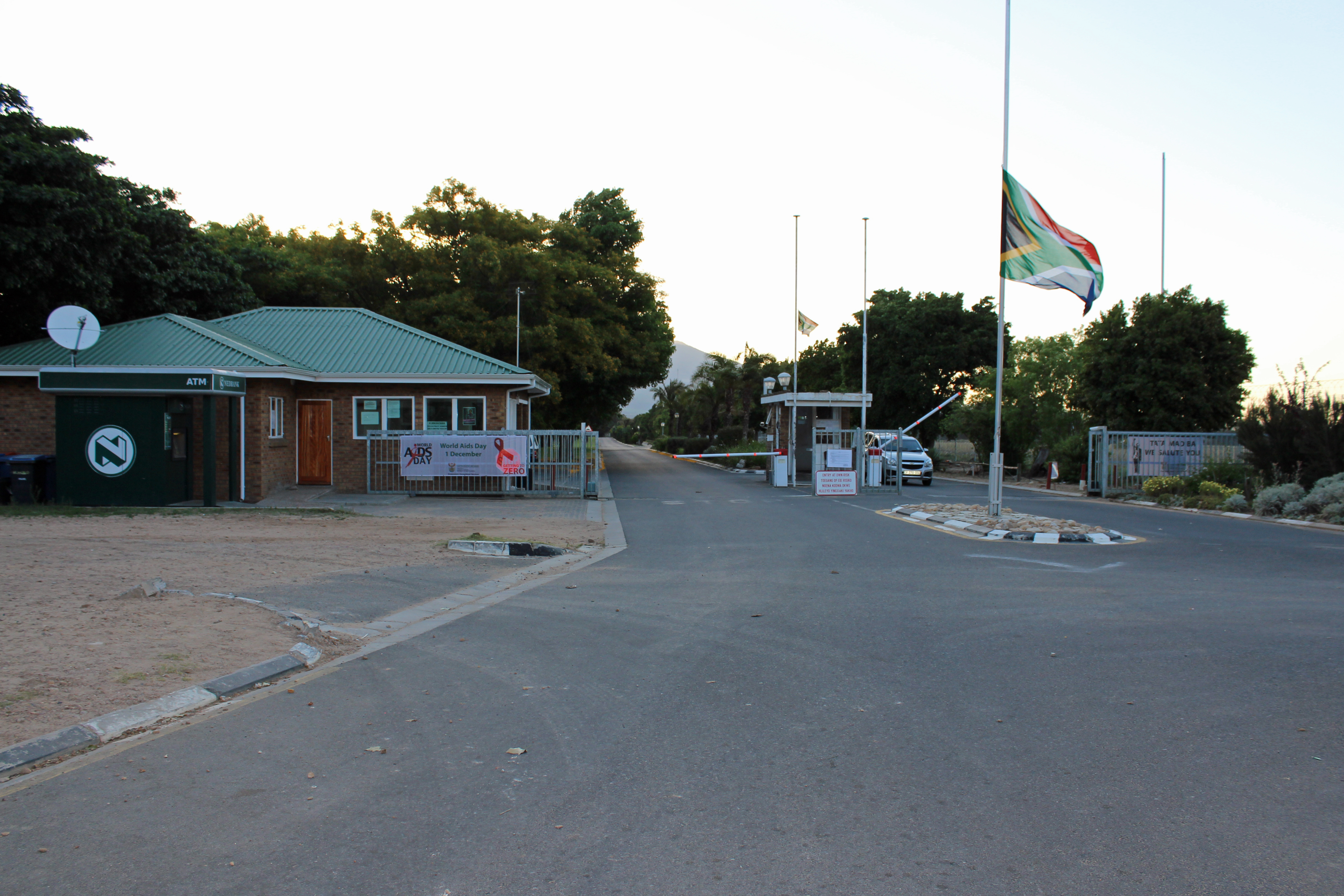
- Interactive map of Drakenstein Correctional Centre
- Location: Drakenstein Local Municipality, Western Cape, South Africa; 33°50′37″S 19°0′58″E
- Status: Operational
- Security class: Low security
- Managed by: Department of Correctional Services

Drakenstein Correctional Centre (formerly Victor Verster Prison) is a low-security prison between Paarl and Franschhoek, on the R301 road 5 km from the R45 Huguenot Road, in the valley of the Dwars River in the Western Cape of South Africa. Nelson Mandela spent the last part of his imprisonment for campaigning against apartheid in the prison.

In 1982 Mandela was transferred from the maximum security prison on Robben Island, a small island in Table Bay, to Pollsmoor Prison in Tokai, Cape Town. From there, he was moved to the then Victor Verster Prison on 9 December 1988, where he lived in a private house inside the prison compound. Victor Verster, a farm prison, was often used as a stepping stone for releasing lower-risk political prisoners. Mandela served another 14 months at Victor Verster Prison until his release on 11 February 1990.

The private house where Mandela lived has been declared a South African National Heritage Site, and a statue of Mandela stands just outside the prison gates.

Henri van Breda, who was found guilty in May 2018 of killing his parents and older brother and the attempted murder of his younger sister, is currently serving three life sentences in this facility.
