= Erasmus Commission (2008) =

Commission to investigate claims of misuse of public funds

The Erasmus Commission was an investigative commission set up by former ANC Western Cape Premier Ebrahim Rasool to investigate claims that the Democratic Alliance, led by Cape Town Mayor Helen Zille, had improperly used public funds to engage in espionage against the DA's opponents. It was headed by Judge Nathan Erasmus. It was stopped when the Cape High Court declared it to be unconstitutional.
