= Sizzlers massacre =

2003 violence against the queer community in Cape Town, South Africa

- Sea Point (South Africa)
- Location: 33°54′51″S 18°23′23″E; 7 Graham Street, Sea Point, Cape Town
- Date: 20 January 2003
- Weapons: Guns, knives
- Deaths: 9
- Injuries: 1
- Victims: Warren Visser; Aubrey Otgaar; Sergio de Castro; Stephanus Fouche; Johan Meyer; Gregory Berghau; Travis Reade; Timothy Boyd; Marius Meyer
- Perpetrators: Adam Roy Woest; Trevor Basil Theys

The Sizzlers massacre took place in Sea Point, Cape Town, South Africa, on 20 January 2003. Nine people were murdered and one person was severely injured in a hate crime against the queer community.

The victims were shot and killed at a gay massage parlour named Sizzlers at 7 Graham Road. Adam Roy Woest and Trevor Basil Theys were convicted for the crime. Woest stated that the initial reason for targeting the massage parlour was to rob it and steal money that Woest and Theys believed was held onsite. Judge Nathan Erasmus described it as the "worst massacre that Cape Town and the country has ever seen."

Woest and Theys were both found guilty of 9 counts of murder and one count of attempted murder, and sentenced to life in prison.

== See also ==
- List of massacres in South Africa
