= Van Breda murders =

Mass murder in South Africa

Coordinates: 33°58′32.3″S 18°49′47.6″E

- Location: Stellenbosch, South Africa
- Date: 27 January 2015; 11 years ago
- Attack type: Familicide, mass murder
- Deaths: 3
- Injuries: 2 (including the perpetrator)
- Perpetrator: Henri Christo van Breda
- Convictions: Murder, attempted murder, obstruction of justice

The Van Breda murders were the killings of three family members and serious injury of another on 27 January 2015 at a golf estate in Stellenbosch, Western Cape, South Africa. After a year and a half of investigations by the South African Police Service, the family's youngest son, Henri Christo van Breda (born 1 November 1994), surrendered to police in June 2016 and was released on bail the next day.

Henri was found guilty of murder, attempted murder, and obstruction of justice on 21 May 2018 by the Western Cape High Court. He was sentenced to life imprisonment for each of the three murders; 15 years for attempted murder; and 12 months for obstruction. The sentences are to run concurrently.

== Murders ==
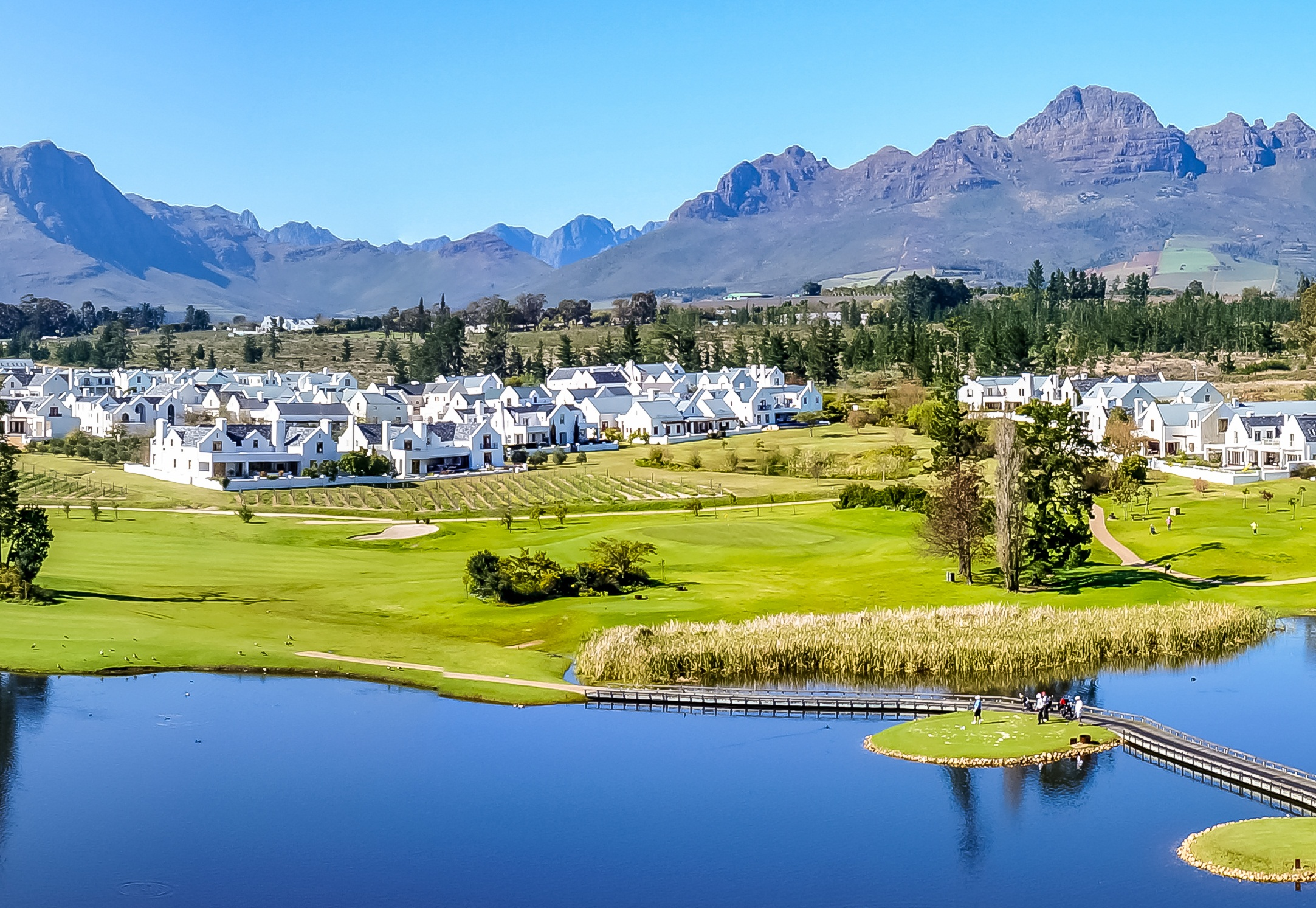
De Zalze Winelands Golf Estate

On 27 January 2015, Martin van Breda, 54, the managing director of the Australian branch of Engel & Völkers, his wife, Teresa, 55, and their eldest son, Rudi, 22, were found dead in their home, victims of an axe attack. Their daughter, Marli, 16, was in a critical condition having sustained serious head injuries. The family's youngest son, Henri, 20, was slightly injured in the incident with only minor lacerations to show.

According to court papers, Henri called his girlfriend at 4:42 a.m., which went unanswered, and then searched the Internet for local emergency numbers. Almost three hours later, he made a call to emergency services, exclaiming, "My ... my family and me were attacked ... by a guy with an axe." The audio recording of this conversation with emergency operators was made available by local broadcaster eNCA a few days after the attack.

== Investigation ==
Police arrived on scene, where emergency services declared Van Breda's parents and brother dead. Marli, who suffered severe head trauma in the attack, was rushed to an intensive care unit. Over the course of a few months, extensive surgery and further medical treatment saved Marli's life; she was later diagnosed with retrograde amnesia and has no recollection of what took place on the evening of the attack.

An axe and a knife, both identified as coming from the Van Breda residence, were recovered at the scene. It was determined that no forced entry was apparent. According to police, Henri was dressed in a pair of sleep shorts and white socks covered in blood, the DNA of which was a match for his parents and brother. The court papers read, "It is believed that after the commission of the crimes, the accused tampered with the crime scene, inflicted injuries to his person and supplied false information to the police in order to mislead police as to the true identity of the perpetrator."

== Aftermath, rearrest, and trial ==
Marli spent months undergoing intensive physiotherapy and eventually returned to school, but was kept separated from her older brother, with both parties residing with family members. Henri continued to plead innocent while local news outlets reported that he had a "tik addiction". According to the Sunday Times, police investigated a number of possible motives, such as Henri's allowance possibly having been cut off by his parents. The Times tracked down a man who claimed to have been Henri's drug dealer and reportedly identified him from a photograph, saying that he had been a regular customer. Henri allegedly spent time at an upmarket drug rehabilitation centre in Cape Town.

After a year and a half of investigations, police called Henri's lawyer to inform her of her client's imminent arrest unless he handed himself over to police, which he did on 13 June 2016. According to reports, Marli's legal representative and curator said, "The news is understandably very distressing to Marli. The family want justice to take its course.” On 14 June, Henri appeared in the Stellenbosch Magistrate Court to face three charges of murder and one of attempted murder and defeating the ends of justice. Bail was set at R100,000 and Henri was released under the conditions that he report to his local police station regularly and not leave the Western Cape.

A pre-trial hearing was held at the Western Cape High Court in September 2016 and the case was postponed until November as state prosecutor Susan Galloway requested more time to obtain outstanding computer and DNA evidence. Henri and his girlfriend, Danielle Janse Van Rensburg, were arrested on 6 September 2016 by Table View police for the possession of cannabis and were granted bail of R1000 and R200 respectively. The case of drug possession was heard on 12 October at the Cape Town Magistrate Court and was postponed due to outstanding documentation.

On 4 April 2017, the state's trial against Henri van Breda started in the Western Cape High Court with him entering a not guilty plea. During testimony describing his recollection of the events, Henri claimed he and the family were attacked by "an axe-wielding black man, wearing dark clothes, gloves and a balaclava-type mask". One month before the trial started, presiding Judge Siraj Desai ruled in favour of an application by media group Media24 to broadcast the trial. However, due to appeals by both the National Prosecuting Authority and the defence, the order was put on hold until the matter was resolved.

=== Verdict ===
On 21 May 2018, the court delivered its verdict through Desai, finding Henri guilty on three counts of murder, one count of attempted murder and defeating the ends of justice. He was immediately taken into custody instead of temporary release until sentencing, in the interest of society, to be transferred to Pollsmoor Prison's hospital section. He was under treatment for epilepsy and depression following the murders.

=== Sentence ===
On 7 June 2018, Henri van Breda was sentenced to three life terms in prison by Desai in the Western Cape High Court for the murders of his mother, father and brother; fifteen years for attempted murder on his sister and a further twelve months for obstruction of justice. On 8 June 2018 he was transferred from Pollsmoor Prison to the Drakenstein Correctional Centre, where he will serve his sentence.

=== Appeal ===
On 7 November 2018, the Supreme Court of Appeal dismissed Henri's application for leave to appeal his conviction and sentence.

== See also ==
- Familicide
- List of massacres in South Africa
- Racial hoax
