= Egerton railway station bus boycott massacre =

1983 massacre in South Africa

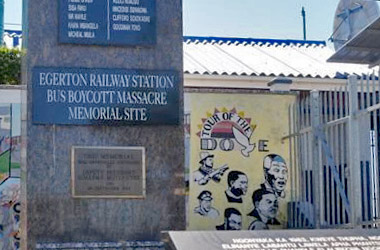
- Egerton railway station bus boycott massacre memorial
- Location: 32°55′10.31″S 27°43′32.81″E; Ciskei, Mdantsane, South Africa
- Date: 4 August 1983
- Weapon: Guns
- Deaths: 11
- Injuries: 36
- Perpetrator: Ciskei police

On 18 July 1983, Mdantsane and East London communities embarked on a bus boycott to protest an unannounced five cent increase in bus fares. The residents abandoned the partly Ciskei government-owned Ciskei Transport Corporation (CTC) buses for taxis and trains. On 4 August 1983, the Ciskei police tried to prevent residents from taking the train at Egerton train station in Mdantsane. After hesitating, the crowd advanced a few paces. However, as the police drew their guns, the people stopped. Without warning, the police fired into the crowd killing 11 and injuring 36 commuters, leading to what is now known as the Egerton railway station bus boycott massacre, the Mdantsane bus boycott massacre, the Egerton massacre, and similar terms.

== Background ==
The Egerton massacre occurred in the then Ciskei township of Mdantsane 20 kilometres (12 miles) outside East London. An attitude survey run by the white apartheid South African government conducted in Mdantsane in July 1981 found that 70% of all the working class respondents identified transport as their most serious problem. 80% of Mdantsane's workers used buses to go to work while 15% used the trains and 5% went to work by car. The bus company, which catered for commuters travelling between East London and Mdantsane, was Ciskei Transport Corporation (CTC). The company was co-owned by the Ciskei State and the Economic Development Corporation. In 1980, the South African Allied Workers Union (SAAWU) held meetings around Mdantsane to hear workers' grievances around transport services.

SAAWU drew up four demands from the workers in Mdantsane:

- 1) The provision of bus shelters
- 2) The provision of tickets that could only be invalidated by the ticket clippers
- 3) Students and pensioners should pay half price
- 4) Cushions should be put on the cold wooden benches.

These demands were ignored by the Ciskei Transport Corporation. This increased tension between the bus company and commuters.

== Bus boycott ==
On 13 July 1983, the Ciskei Transport Corporation introduced an 11% (50 cent) bus fare increase on the route between East London and Mdantsane. The issue had been discussed amongst the organised workers and members of the political organisations in the preceding weeks. A meeting with 1000 people was held in a church hall in Duncan Village on 10 July 1983. A committee of ten workers known as the "Committee of Ten" was elected to represent the community's interests to the CTC. The Committee of Ten tried to meet CTC management on Monday 11 July. The CTC refused on the grounds that they had already talked to community leaders two months before the increases were announced. A second mass meeting was held on 12 July in Duncan Village. About 3000 people attended. The CTC responses were unanimously rejected and a decision was taken to boycott the buses. On 18 July, the bus boycott began. The commuters initially walked to work in large groups, from Mdantsane across the Ciskei border to East London, a distance of about twenty kilometres. On its second day, the boycott attracted over 80% of the bus commuters. The number of police soon increased as reinforcements were brought in, and they became more brutal. This made walking in large numbers on the open road too dangerous. People began to use the trains. The railway, which formed Ciskei's border with the rest of South Africa, was run by the South African Transport Services and located on the outskirts of Mdantsane. The train fares were marginally lower than the bus fares and provided a space for commuters to discuss issues affecting the community. The train fares increased on 1 August 1983 but the commuters continued to use trains.

The bus boycott received a negative response from the Ciskei government. Security forces and vigilantes set up roadblocks in Mdantsane, and there were reports of commuters being hauled out of taxis and ordered onto buses. On 22 July 1983, five people were shot and wounded by Ciskei security forces at the Fort Jackson railway station. On 30 July, a man was attacked and killed by vigilantes while walking near the Mdantsane stadium, which was used by vigilantes as a base. On 3 August, a state of emergency was declared in Mdantsane and a night curfew imposed. Meetings of more than four people were banned and people were prohibited from walking in groups larger than four.

== The massacre ==
The Ciskei government police and soldiers formed an armed human blockade at the Fort Jackson, Mount Ruth and Ergeton stations to prevent commuters from catching the train on 4 August 1983. The commuters moved a few paces forward. The police drew their guns and the people stopped. Without warning the police fired into the crowd. 11 people died and 36 were injured. The soldiers prevented people from going into the hospital's casualty ward to find the dead. The Ciskei government intensified its security measures, arresting 700 people in a week. By the end of August 1983, over 1000 people were in jail.

== Aftermath ==
The massacre led to banning of the South African Allied Workers Union. Eleven out of twelve schools in Mdantsane were closed in protest against the massacre. On 24 September 2013, former South African deputy president Kgalema Motlanthe unveiled the upgraded Egerton Bus Boycott Massacre Memorial Site. The boycott lasted until 15 March 1985, when it was called off at a mass meeting held by the Committee of Ten.

== See also ==
- List of massacres in South Africa
- Marikana massacre
- Sharpeville massacre
- Bisho massacre
