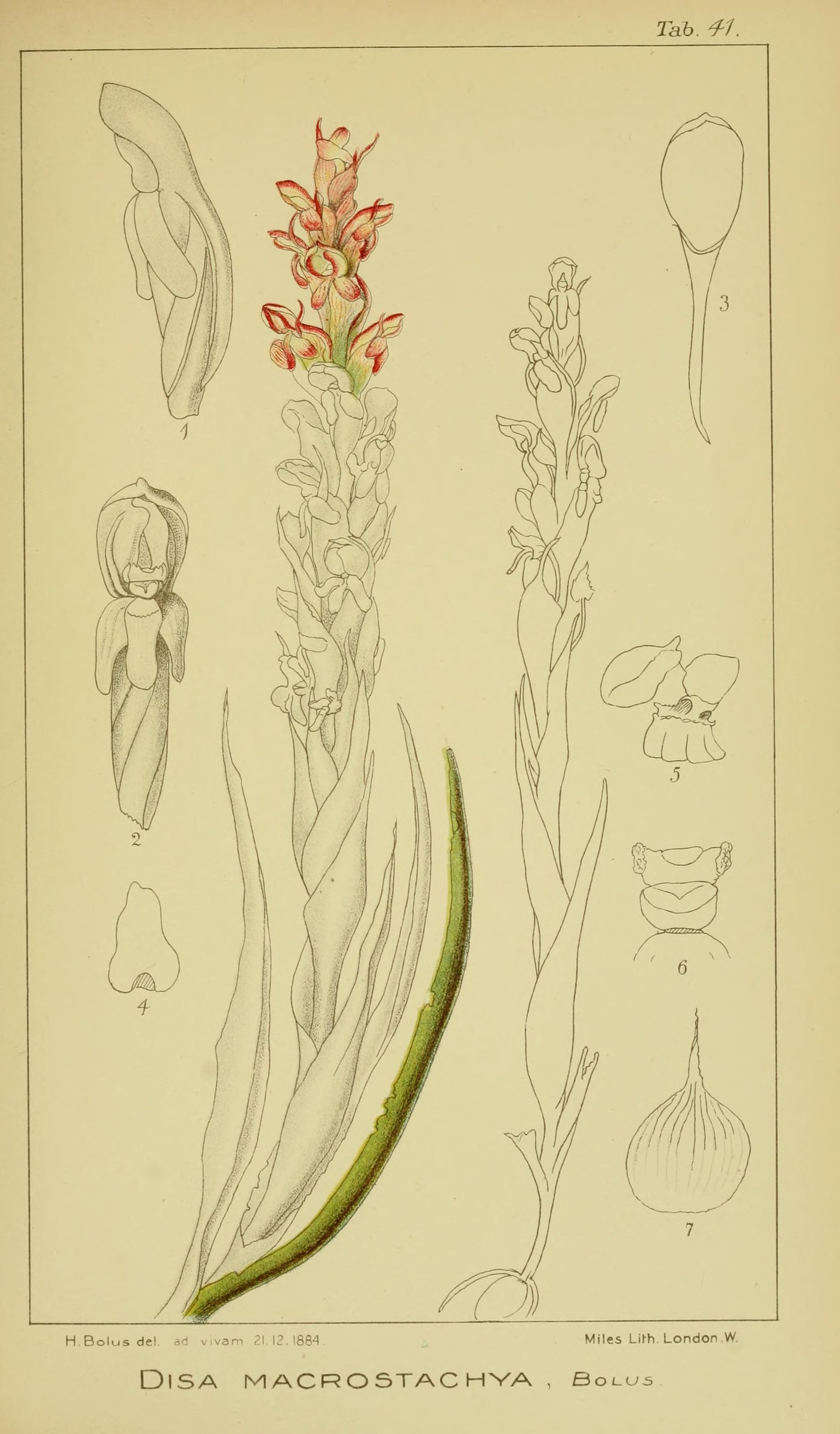

Scientific classification
- Kingdom: Plantae
- Clade: Tracheophytes
- Clade: Angiosperms
- Clade: Monocots
- Order: Asparagales
- Family: Orchidaceae
- Subfamily: Orchidoideae
- Genus: Disa
- Species: D. macrostachya

Binomial name
- Disa macrostachya (Lindl.) Bolus

Synonyms
- Monadenia macrostachya Lindl.

= Disa macrostachya =

Species of flowering plant

Disa macrostachya is a perennial plant and geophyte belonging to the genus Disa and is part of the fynbos. The species is endemic to the Northern Cape and occurs in the Namaqualand on the Kamiesberge on the northern slopes. The plant has an area of occurrence of 11 km2. There are three subpopulations of which two consist of approximately 50 plants and the third of 100 plants. The plant is threatened by overgrazing and trampling.
