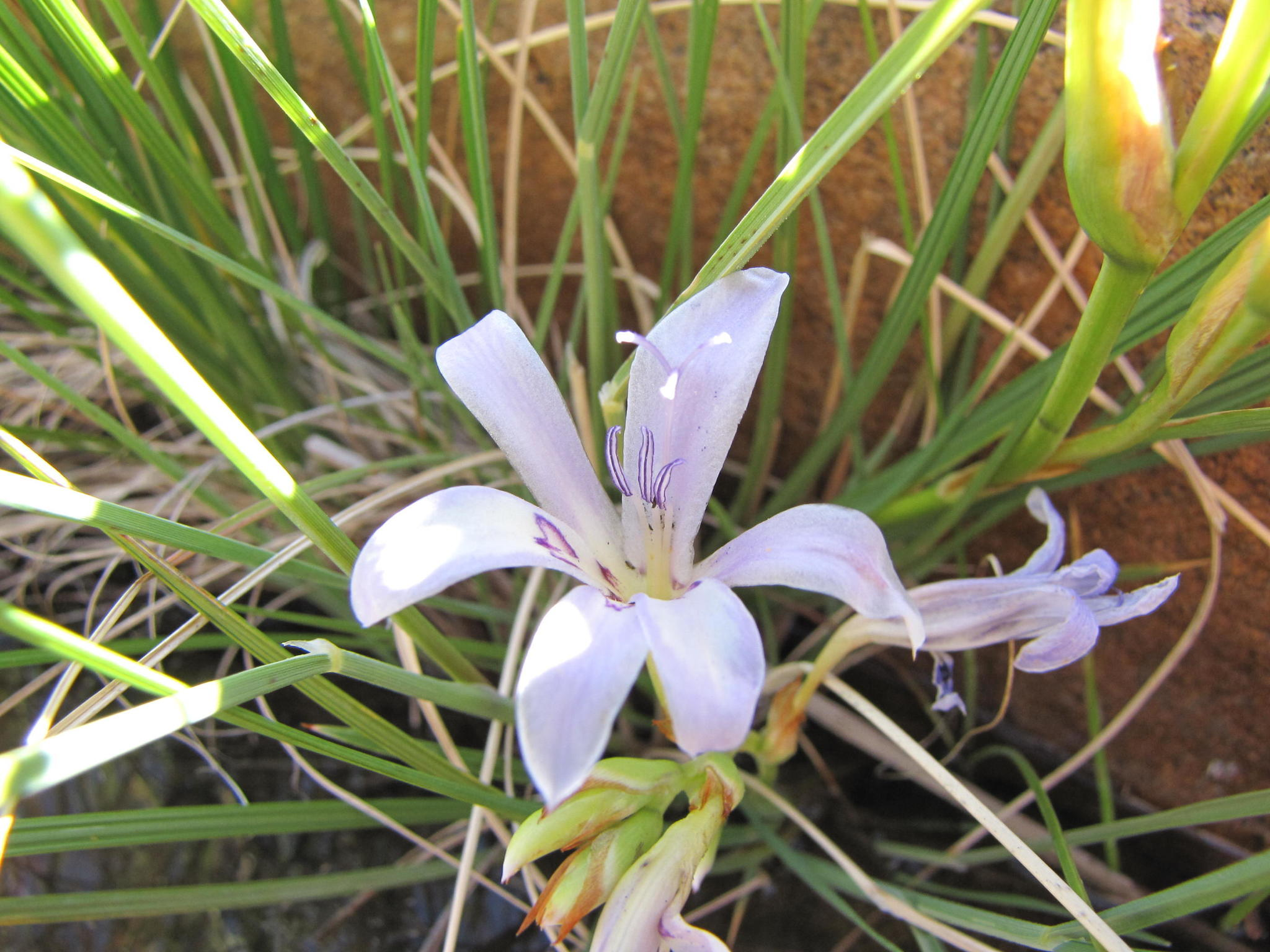

Scientific classification
- Kingdom: Plantae
- Clade: Tracheophytes
- Clade: Angiosperms
- Clade: Monocots
- Order: Asparagales
- Family: Iridaceae
- Genus: Babiana
- Species: B. rivulicola

Binomial name
- Babiana rivulicola Goldblatt & J.C.Manning

= Babiana rivulicola =

Species of flowering plant

Babiana rivulicola is a species of geophytic, perennial flowering plant in the family Iridaceae. The species is endemic to the Northern Cape and occurs on the Kamiesberge where it is part of the succulent Karoo vegetation. Here it has an area of occurrence of 5 km^{2} and is considered rare.
