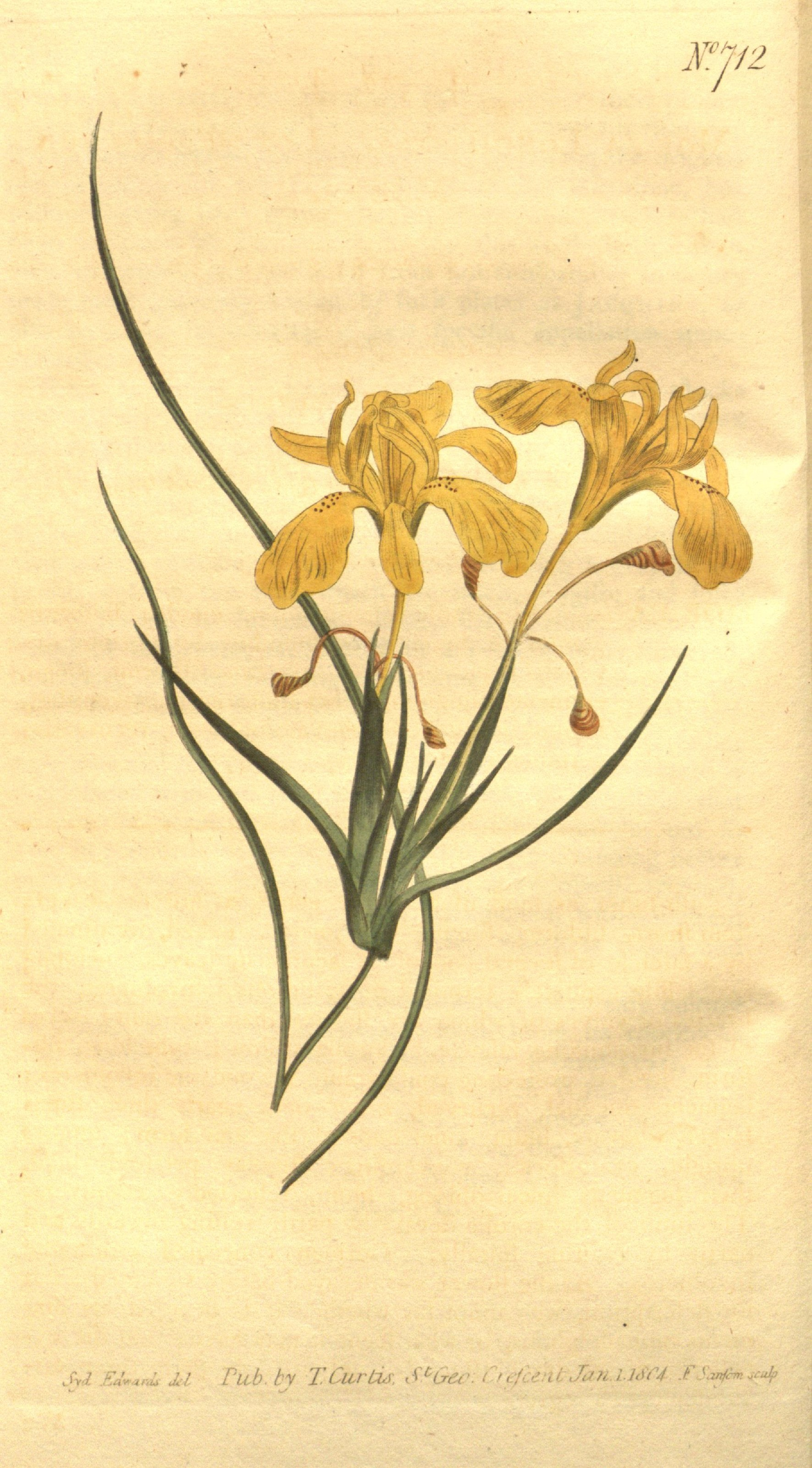

Scientific classification
- Kingdom: Plantae
- Clade: Tracheophytes
- Clade: Angiosperms
- Clade: Monocots
- Order: Asparagales
- Family: Iridaceae
- Genus: Moraea
- Species: M. longiflora

Binomial name
- Moraea longiflora Ker Gawl.

Synonyms
- Gynandriris longiflora (Ker Gawl.) R.C.Foster; Helixyra flava Salisb.; Helixyra longiflora (Ker Gawl.) N.E.Br.

= Moraea longiflora =

Species of flowering plant

Moraea longiflora is a plant and geophyte belonging to the genus Moraea and is part of the Namaqualand renosterveld. The species is endemic to the Northern Cape and occurs on the Kamiesberge. It has an area of occurrence of less than 80 km^{2}. There are two subpopulations and the total number of plants is less than 1000 plants. The plant is threatened by overgrazing.
