= Manie Maritz =

South African general (1876–1940)

Salomon Gerhardus Maritz
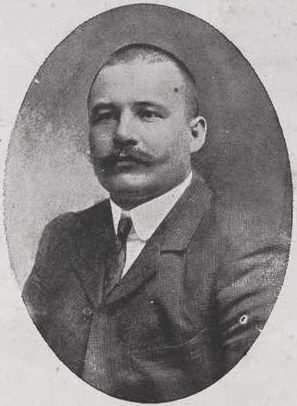
- Born: 26 July 1876; Kimberley, Cape Colony
- Died: 20 December 1940 (aged 64); Pretoria, Union of South Africa
- Spouse: Emma Frances Nel (m. 1908)
- Military career
- Allegiance: South African Republic
- Nickname: Manie Maritz
- Conflicts: Jameson Raid; Second Boer War; Herero Wars; World War I: Maritz rebellion

Manie Maritz (26 July 1876 – 20 December 1940), also known as Gerrit Maritz, was a Boer officer during the Second Boer War. He was also a participant in the Herero and Nama genocide and later a leading participant in the pro-German Maritz rebellion in 1914. In the 1930s, Maritz became an outspoken Nazi sympathizer and supporter of Nazi Germany.

== Early years ==
Maritz was born in Kimberley, Northern Cape, then in the British colony of the Cape of Good Hope, and as such, was a British subject. He was christened Salomon Gerhardus Maritz. When he turned 19 he went to Johannesburg and was employed as a cab driver by his uncle. During the Jameson Raid he volunteered as a guard of the Johannesburg fort. This entitled him to become a citizen of the Zuid-Afrikaansche Republiek (ZAR). This, in turn, permitted him to join the Zuid-Afrikaansche Republiek Politie (ZARP), the police force in Johannesburg.

== Second Boer War ==
Maritz joined the Boksburg Commando and proceeded to the Natal front. Later he joined Daniel Theron's reconnaissance corps and then participated in the invasion of the Cape Colony. He eventually landed up in the desert-like terrain of the North-western Cape. Maritz claims that Jan Smuts appointed him as a veggeneraal ('fighting-general'). At that time Deneys Reitz was on the staff of General Jan Smuts. Reitz writes that Maritz was only a "leader of various rebel bands". If Smuts had appointed Maritz as a fighting general, Reitz would have known about it.

Near the end of the war Maritz ordered the killing of 35 Coloured (Khoikhoi) in what became known as the Leliefontein massacre. The massacre was a retaliation for an attack against Maritz and his party, when he went to interview European missionaries in Leilefontein. Gideon Scheepers and Breaker Morant were court-martialled and shot for similar crimes. When peace was made, the burghers of the erstwhile republics were obliged to lay down their arms and sign an oath of allegiance to the British monarch. Instead, Maritz slipped over the border to German South West Africa. In his autobiography, he did not explain why he did so.

== Inter war years ==
Maritz went to Europe and then to Madagascar, where he served as an land purchase agent of the eccentric French millionaire Jacques Lebaudy, who intended to acquire a personal fiefdom in Africa. During his time in Madagascar he also helped Deneys Reitz tame oxen for a transportation enterprise. He subsequently returned via Europe to South Africa, where he farmed horses in the Cape and is believed to have helped the Germans during the Herero and Nama genocide. When Maritz returned, he went to the Transvaal, but was arrested for entering the colony, not having signed the oath of allegiance. He departed for the Cape. When the Free State received responsible government, he went there and later joined the police in the Transvaal.

== First World War ==
In 1913, Maritz was offered a commission in the Active Citizen Force of the Union Defence Force. He accepted and, after attending a training course, he was appointed to command the military area abutting German South-West Africa. In August 1914, he was promoted to Lieutenant-Colonel. There is evidence that he started colluding with the Germans at a very early stage. As early as the (southern hemisphere) autumn of 1913 he had contact with the German governor in the neighbouring country.

On 23 September 1914 Maritz was ordered to advance in the direction of the German border, to support the Union's invasion in the vicinity of Sandfontein, where a portion of Lieutenant-Colonel Lukin's force was stranded. He refused to do so. Then he was ordered to relinquish command to another officer and return to Pretoria, but again refused to do so. On 9 October he eventually decided to rebel. The next day he occupied the town of Keimoes. Then on 22 October he was wounded in a skirmish with government troops and he was taken to German South-West Africa.

Some people have named the rebellion after him.

== Later life ==
When Maritz returned to South Africa in 1923 he was arrested and charged with high treason. He was convicted and sentenced to three years' imprisonment. When General Hertzog's National Party won the 1924 election, they released him after he had served only three months. During the 1930s, Maritz became a Nazi sympathiser and was known as an outspoken proponent of the Third Reich. In 1939 he published his autobiography called My Lewe en Strewe (My life and aspiration). Britz points out that the book was written many years after the events, lacks objectivity and has a strong emotional flavour. The anti-Semitic statements in his book resulted in his prosecution for fomenting racial hatred. He was found guilty and fined £75.

== Death ==
Maritz died in a car crash in Pretoria on 19 December 1940, at the age of 64. He was buried in the Pretoria West Cemetery.

== In popular culture ==
The character General Manie Roosa, in James Rollins and Grant Blackwood's novel The Kill Switch (2014), is "very loosely based on the real-life Boer leader Manie Maritz.

Maritz is referred to many times in John Buchan's Greenmantle (1916) in which the heroes, who are British spies, masquerade as veterans of Maritz's rebellion in order to infiltrate among German strategists.
