= Durban riots =

1949 anti-Indian riot in Durban, South Africa

The Durban riots were an anti-Indian riot that took place between 13 and 15 January 1949, primarily by black South Africans targeting Indian South Africans in Durban, South Africa. It was the second deadliest massacre during apartheid.

== Thursday riots ==
On the evening of Thursday, 13 January 1949 ethnic Indians in the centre of the Indian business area of Durban were assaulted by black Africans. The riots began at Victoria street in the heartland of Indian commercial centre. The assailants began to attack individual Indians, stoning vehicles driven by Indians and looting Indian stores while chanting "Usuthu!". The violence was initially limited to destruction of property and looting which subdued after a few hours of rioting. An account by a police detective present at the riots states that there was an organised element to the riots within the Zulu community and "The talk was that the time had come to rid the country of the Indians."

== Friday riots ==
On Friday, African leaders from Cato Manor organised rioters from workers' hostels and from social networks such as the ingoma dancing troupes and boxing clubs. Taking advantage of the slow police intervention, the assailants attacked the Indian business area with an assortment of improvised weapons, attacking both property and people. Numerous reports suggest that European whites cheered the African assailants and joined in looting Indian stores. Donald L. Horowitz notes in his book The Deadly Ethnic Riot: "A number of European women urged the Natives [Africans] on to 'hit the coolies [Indians derogative]'. Thereafter they went dancing up the street with the Natives. The pictorial record shows Europeans actively inciting the Natives, or evincing all the signs of enjoyment at their excesses."

By early evening the government troops blockaded the Indian district in central Durban after which the focus of assaults shifted to the suburban areas of Cato Manor, Clairwood, and the Jacobs area, where numerous acts of murder, arson, rape, and attacks and looting took place.

Rampaging African crowds burnt houses, stores, raped Indian women and girls and killed Indians of all ages and sexes. An article in the Indian Opinion recounted the devastation:

"Huddled under the flames of one of the burning shops were four Indian women and a dozen weeping children. The male owner was in a grotesque attitude on the front path, knifed in several places and dying. A younger [Indian] son staggered in the road with his head split open. This was one of the hundreds of pathetic sites that were witnessed in Cato and other districts of Durban."

Friday night saw the peak of the violence when Africans hurled paraffin tins into Indian owned buildings and entire Indian families were burned to ashes alive.

== Saturday riots ==
By Saturday, the military and police were mostly able to establish order although limited violence occurred in Pietermaritzburg a few days later.

== Aftermath ==
The riots resulted in the massacre of mostly Indian people in which 142 people died and 1087 people were injured. 300 buildings were destroyed and 2000 structures were damaged. It also created 40,000 Indian refugees, followed by a wave of suicides among Indians, as a result of the disintegration of their families, economic failure, stress, humiliation and racist discrimination.

== See also ==
- List of massacres in South Africa
- 2021 South African unrest
