= Leliefontein massacre =

Attack during the Second Boer War in South Africa

- Part of the Second Boer War
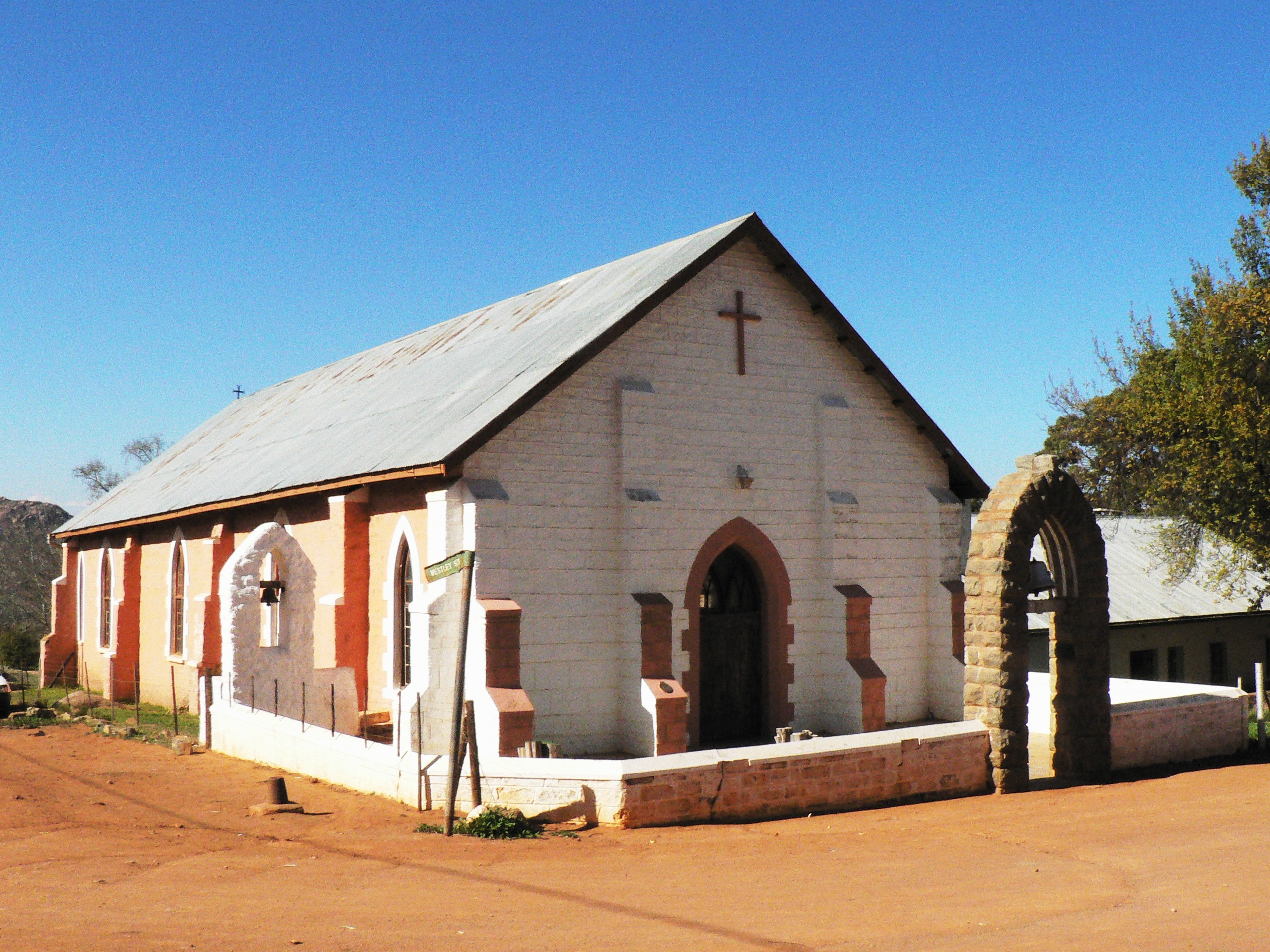
- Methodist Mission Church, Leliefontein (erected in 1855, it was the third church built at the mission station)
- Location: 30°18′55″S 18°5′1″E; Leliefontein missionary station, Northern Cape, South Africa
- Date: 31 January 1902
- Target: Khoikhoi
- Deaths: 35
- Perpetrator: Boer forces under General Manie Maritz
- Defender: Khoikhoi

The Leliefontein massacre occurred on 31 January 1902 during the South African War at the Leliefontein Methodist mission station in the Northern Cape, South Africa.

== Leliefontein ==
Leliefontein is a small community in the Kamiesberg range of Namaqualand, near Garies in the Northern Cape. It is probably named after the many white lilies found in the area.

Leliefontein was originally the kraal of a Nama chief named Wildschut by Europeans. By October 1771, the land had been granted to Hermanus Engelbrecht, a white colonial farmer, but Governor Joachim van Plettenberg ordered Engelbrecht to vacate the land in 1772 after he was informed that the Nama already occupied the land. Missionary work began under the London Missionary Society in 1809, but an attack by competing settlers caused the station to be abandoned in 1811. In 1816, Chief Wildschut asked for another station to be established. This request was fulfilled by the Wesleyan Methodist Reverend Barnabas Shaw of the Wesleyan Missionary Society. Leliefontein was the first Methodist mission in South Africa. Several church buildings were built thereafter.

== Attack ==
Boer leader Manie Maritz killed 35 indigenous inhabitants of the settlement, in retaliation for attacking his party when he went to interview the European missionaries in the town. Maritz served under General Jan Smuts. The attack took place over two days. On the first day Maritz and his men rode into Leliefontein, detained the chief missionary, and handed out proclamations threatening death to residents and the missionaries as a punishment for being British sympathisers in the Second Boer War.

The Khoikhoi Nama, who were residents of Leliefontein along with the missionaries, were angered by the threats and a scuffle ensued. The residents of Leliefontein inflicted serious casualties on the Boers on the first day, when they killed 30 Boers and lost only seven Nama in the fight.

Maritz summoned reinforcements and invaded Leliefontein the following day leading to a battle in which 43 Nama people were killed and an estimated 100 wounded. The residents of Leliefontein were massacred while taking shelter in the mission church. Leliefontein was one of the first massacres of the 20th century in South Africa. The Leliefontein mission had livestock and it also produced corn and vegetables. The outpost was completely destroyed by Maritz's troops and indiscriminate violence was meted out to the residents.

The refugees left by the massacre were hunted down by Boer forces and killed. Others were captured and forced to work as slave labourers cooking and cleaning for the troops. Maritz was never punished for his actions at Leliefontein. The Leliefontein Methodist Church and Parsonage is a national heritage site to commemorate the losses of the massacre.

== Reactions ==
On 31 January 1902, a Boer guerrilla commander Deneys Reitz, part of General Jan Smuts force, arrived in Leliefontein en route to Springbok.

Deneys Reitz described the scene as follows:

"We found the place sacked and gutted and among the rocks beyond the buried houses lay 20 or 30 dead Hottentots, still clutching their antiquated muzzleloaders. This was Maritz’s handiwork. He had ridden into the station with a few men to interview the European missionaries, when he was set upon by armed Hottentots, he and his escorts narrowly escaping with their lives. To avenge the insult, he returned the next morning with a stronger force and wiped out the settlement, which seemed to many of us a ruthless and unjustifiable act. General Smuts said nothing but I saw him walk past the boulders where the dead lay, and on his return he was moody and curt."

Maritz took issue with Reitz's interpretation of the situation:

“According to Reitz, General Smuts would have rather approved if he had seen our own bodies there. I can assure them that we had to fight hard for our lives that day in front of the church, and if the Hotnots had got the upper hand, they would have treated us cruelly.”

== See also ==
- List of massacres in South Africa
