= 1899 =

1899 in various calendars
- Gregorian calendar: 1899; MDCCCXCIX
- Ab urbe condita: 2652
- Armenian calendar: 1348; ԹՎ ՌՅԽԸ
- Assyrian calendar: 6649
- Baháʼí calendar: 55–56
- Balinese saka calendar: 1820–1821
- Bengali calendar: 1305–1306
- Berber calendar: 2849
- British Regnal year: 62 Vict. 1 – 63 Vict. 1
- Buddhist calendar: 2443
- Burmese calendar: 1261
- Byzantine calendar: 7407–7408
- Chinese calendar: 戊戌年 (Earth Dog); 4596 or 4389 — to — 己亥年 (Earth Pig); 4597 or 4390
- Coptic calendar: 1615–1616
- Discordian calendar: 3065
- Ethiopian calendar: 1891–1892
- Hebrew calendar: 5659–5660
- Hindu calendars
- Vikram Samvat: 1955–1956
- Shaka Samvat: 1820–1821
- Kali Yuga: 4999–5000
- Holocene calendar: 11899
- Igbo calendar: 899–900
- Iranian calendar: 1277–1278
- Islamic calendar: 1316–1317
- Japanese calendar: Meiji 32 (明治３２年)
- Javanese calendar: 1828–1829
- Julian calendar: Gregorian minus 12 days
- Korean calendar: 4232
- Minguo calendar: 13 before ROC 民前13年
- Nanakshahi calendar: 431
- Thai solar calendar: 2441–2442
- Tibetan calendar: ས་ཕོ་ཁྱི་ལོ་ (male Earth-Dog); 2025 or 1644 or 872 — to — ས་མོ་ཕག་ལོ་ (female Earth-Boar); 2026 or 1645 or 873

1899 (MDCCCXCIX) was a common year starting on Sunday of the Gregorian calendar and a common year starting on Friday of the Julian calendar, the 1899th year of the Common Era (CE) and Anno Domini (AD) designations, the 899th year of the 2nd millennium, the 99th year of the 19th century, and the 10th and last year of the 1890s decade. As of the start of 1899, the Gregorian calendar was 12 days ahead of the Julian calendar, which remained in localized use until 1923.

== Events ==
=== January ===
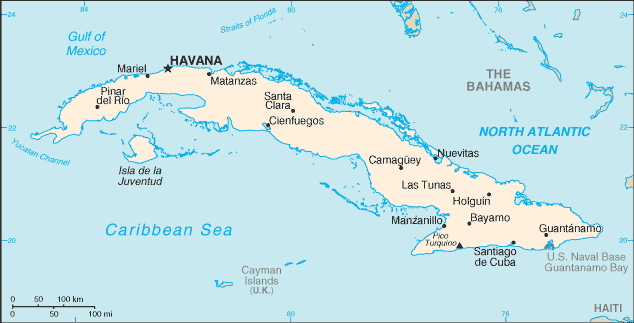
January 1: Cuba free.

- January 1
  - Spanish rule formally ends in Cuba with the cession of Spanish sovereignty to the U.S., concluding 400 years of the Spanish Empire in the Americas.
  - In Samoa, followers of Mataafa, claimant to the rule of the island's subjects, burn the town of Upolu in an ambush of followers of other claimants, Malietoa Tanus and Tamasese, who are evacuated by the British warship HMS Porpoise.
  - Theodore Roosevelt is inaugurated as Governor of New York at the age of 39.
- January 3 – A treaty of alliance is signed between Russia and Afghanistan.
- January 5 –
  - A fierce battle is fought between American troops and Filipino defenders at the town of Pililla on the island of Luzon.
  - The collision of a British steamer and a French steamer kills 12 people on the English Channel.
- January 6 – Baron Curzon takes office as the Governor-General of British India.
- January 7 – Emilio Aguinaldo, leader of the Philippine insurrection against the U.S. occupation, issues a proclamation calls on Filipinos to continue the fight for liberty. President McKinley dispatches USS Princeton and USS Yorktown to Manila.
- January 8 – The Association football club SK Rapid Wien is founded in Vienna.
- January 9 –
  - After a successful revolt against the Ottoman Empire by the inhabitants of the island of Crete, the area, which joins Greece, gets its first constitution.
  - A crash between two trains on the Lehigh Valley Railroad kills 16 people and injures 20 in the U.S. state of New Jersey.
- January 10 – The Tau Kappa Epsilon fraternity is founded, at Illinois Wesleyan University in Bloomington, Illinois.
- January 12 – The French government passes a vote of confidence in the Chamber of Deputies, 423 to 124.
- January 13 – The Canadian Northern Railway is established.
- January 14
  - The White Star Line's transatlantic ocean liner RMS Oceanic is launched from the Belfast shipyards in Ireland. At 17,272 gross register tons and 704 ft (215 m), she is the largest ship afloat at this time.
  - The British four-masted sailing ship Andelana capsizes during a storm in Commencement Bay off the coast of the U.S. state of Washington, with the loss of all 17 of her crew.
  - U.S. Navy Captain Richard P. Leary becomes the military governor of Guam.
- January 15 – The General Federated Union, representing 100,000 laborers in the U.S. state of New York, is formed from a merger of the Central Labor Union and the Central Labor Federation.
- January 17 – The United States takes possession of Wake Island in the Pacific Ocean.
- January 19 – The Anglo-Egyptian Sudan is formed as part of a convention between the British and Egyptian governments. The Sudan colony will be disbanded in 1956.
- January 21

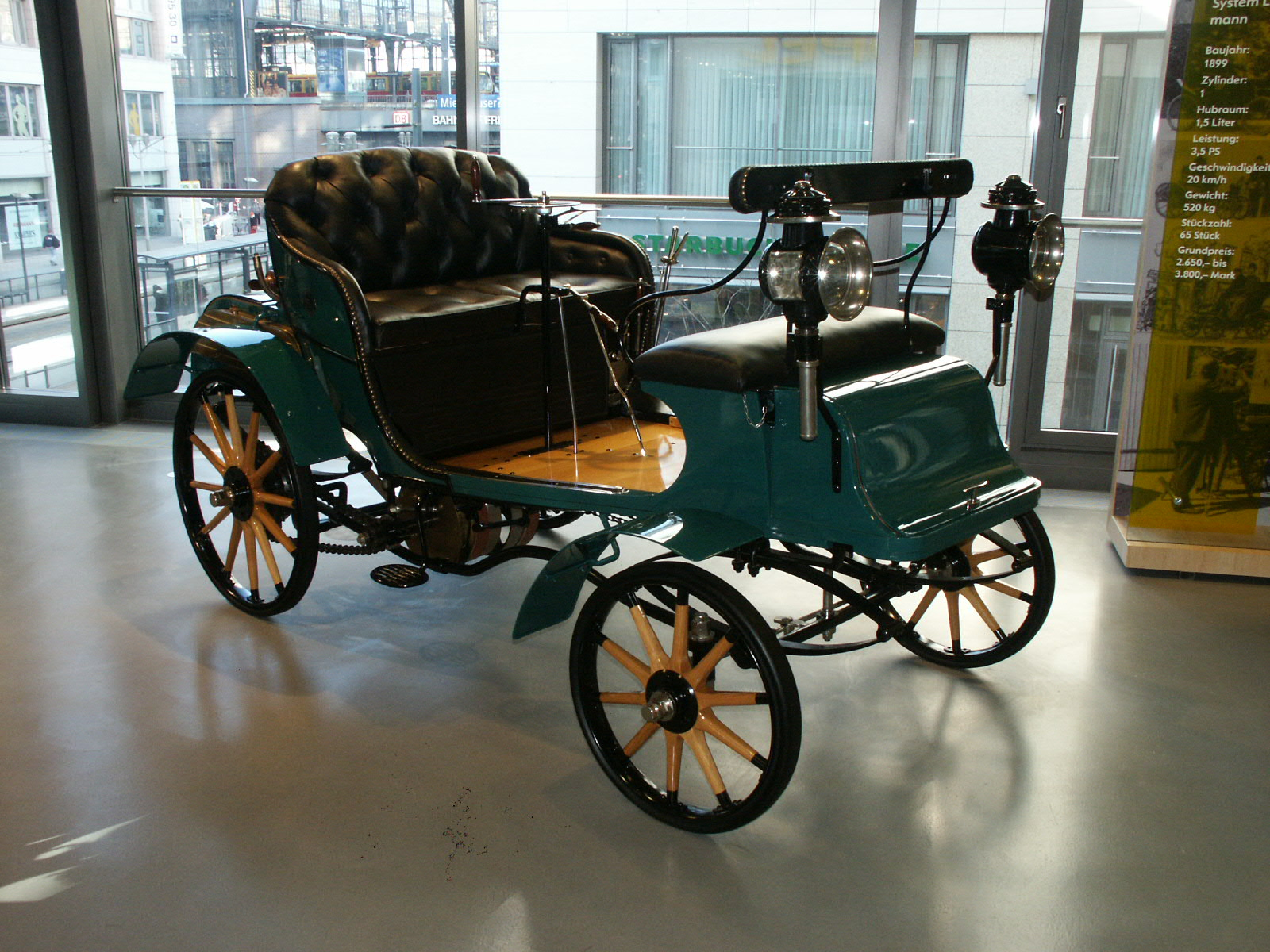
January 21: Opel car.

  - Opel Motors opens for business in Germany.
  - The Malolos Constitution is ratified by the Revolutionary Government of the Philippines.
  - Lord Kitchener is appointed as the British Governor of the Anglo-Egyptian Sudan.
- January 22 – The leaders of six Australian colonies meet in Melbourne, to discuss the Federation of Australia as a whole.
- January 23
  - Emilio Aguinaldo is sworn in as President of the First Philippine Republic, a declaration of independence against the U.S. military government of the Philippines.
  - Mubarak Al-Sabah, the emir of Kuwait, signs the Anglo-Kuwaiti Agreement of 1899, a secret treaty with the British Empire to accept protectorate status for the Middle Eastern sheikdom in return for British protection of Kuwaiti territory.
  - The New York Stock Exchange has the largest day of business in its history, with 1,527,644 shares of stock changing hands.
  - Because of illness, King Oscar of Sweden and Norway entrusts the government to Crown Prince Gustav.
  - The British Southern Cross Expedition crosses the Antarctic Circle.
- January 24 – The Philadelphia College of Osteopathic Medicine is founded.
- January 26 – German inventor Karl Ferdinand Braun, who will later share the 1909 Nobel Prize in Physics with Guglielmo Marconi, receives a British patent for his wireless radio invention "Telegraphy without directly connected wire".
- January 27 –
  - Camille Jenatzy of France becomes the first man to drive an automobile more than 80 kilometers per hour, when he reaches a speed of 80.35 kph in his CGA Dogcart racecar. Jenatzy's speed is more than 20% faster than the previous record.
  - The Tsar Nicholas II of the Russian Empire decrees that all high officials in the Russian-administered Grand Duchy of Finland shall be required to be fluent in the Russian language.
- January 28 –
  - The League of Peja, organized by Haxhi Zeka to lobby for a Kosovar Albanian state within the Ottoman Empire, attracts 450 delegates to its first convention, held at the city of Peja.
  - Konstantin Stoilov, Prime Minister of Bulgaria and his cabinet ministers resign in a disagreement over self-government for Macedonia.
  - The premiers of the various states of Australia, along with the premier of Tasmania, meet in a conference at Melbourne to discuss the question of a federation of the states.
- January 29 – A gas explosion kills 14 people in the Spanish city of Cartagena.
- January 30 –
  - A steamer arrives at Barcelona in Spain after having started out with 1,300 Spanish soldiers who had withdrawn from Cuba. Of the group, 350 are seriously ill and 56 died during the trip.
  - Speaker Howard E. Wright of the California State Assembly resigns the speakership after surviving a motion of expulsion by the members. Only 10 had been in favor of expelling Wright because of charges of bribery, and 60 opposed.
- January 31 –
  - Dimitar Grekov forms a new government in Bulgaria.
  - The French Senate passes the trade agreement with Italy by a vote of 248 to 40.

=== February ===
- February 1
  - Ranavalona III, who had been the Queen of Madagascar until being deposed on February 28, 1897, is sent into exile by French colonial authorities, along with the rest of the royal family.
  - The Suntory whisky distiller and worldwide alcoholic and soft drink brand of Japan is established by Shinjiro Torii in Osaka as a store selling imported wines.
- February 2 –
  - The participants in the Australian Premiers' Conference agree that Australia's capital (Canberra) should be located between Sydney and Melbourne.
  - The Tsar of Russia donates $500,000 for the relief of famine suffered by peasants in the Empire.
- February 4 – The Philippine–American War begins as hostilities break out in Manila.
- February 5 – The first major battle of the Philippine–American War concludes with the capture by the U.S. of the San Juan River Bridge that connects Manila and San Juan.
- February 6 –
  - By a vote of 57 to 27, a peace treaty between the United States and Spain is ratified by the United States Senate to end the Spanish–American War.
  - An investigation by the U.S. government determines that more than 10,000 cans of meat that had been purchased for use by troops in Cuba had been rancid.
- February 7 – Following conviction at court-martial for "conduct unbecoming an officer and a gentleman" arising from his accusations against Major General Nelson A. Miles, U.S. Commissioner General Charles P. Eagan is suspended from duty for six years by President McKinley.
- February 8 – The Congressional commission for investigation of conduct of the Spanish–American War sends its report to the President.
- February 10 – U.S. Army troops, supported by bombardment from the warships Charleston and Monadnock, defeat Filipino forces in the Battle of Caloocan and get control of the Manila to Dagupan railway.
- February 11 – In the Philippines, the city of Iloilo is captured by troops led by U.S. Army Brigadier General Marcus P. Miller.
- February 12 –
  - The cornerstone for the Aswan Dam is set down in Egypt.
  - In the U.S., a fire kills 17 women at a cottage at the South Dakota State Insane Asylum in Yankton, South Dakota.
  - An avalanche kills 12 Italian workers in the U.S. at Silver Plume, Colorado.
- February 13 –
  - Cipriano Castro starts the Restorative Liberal Revolution by leading 60 people from exile to cross the Colombia–Venezuela border to defeat Ignacio Andrade's government.
  - A blizzard strikes the east coast of the U.S., shutting down all train service in New York City, Philadelphia, Baltimore and Washington, D.C.
  - An earthquake strikes in the U.S. and is felt in Tennessee, North Carolina, Virginia and Ohio, but causes no casualties.
- February 14 – The U.S. Senate votes, 26 to 22, against the permanent annexation of the Philippine Islands as U.S. territory.
- February 15 – The February Manifesto is issued by the Emperor of Russia, decreeing that a veto by the Diet of Finland may be overruled in legislative matters concerning the interest of all Russia, including autonomous Finland.
- February 16
  - Félix Faure, the President of France since 1895, dies of a stroke in his office while engaged in sexual activity with his mistress, Marguerite Steinheil.
  - Knattspyrnufélag Reykjavíkur, the first Association football club in Iceland, is established in Reykjavík.
- February 17 – The research vessel SS Southern Cross, on an Antarctic expedition led by Carsten Borchgrevink, arrives at Cape Adare and begins unloading 90 sledge dogs – the first ever on the continent – and two Norwegian Sámi crewmen, who become the first humans to spend the night in Antarctica. Over the next 12 days, the rest of the 31-man crew builds a temporary settlement.
- February 18 – The National Assembly of France elects a new president to serve the remainder of the late President Faure's term. Senate president Émile Loubet wins the vote against prime minister Jules Méline.
- February 19 – In Venezuela, the former Minister of War, Major General Ramón Guerra, angry with the reforms of President Ignacio Andrade, proclaims the state of Guárico as an independent territory. Andrade orders General Augusto Lutowsky to crush the rebellion. Guerra flees to Colombia but later comes back as Minister of War.
- February 20 –
  - Discussions among members of a joint Anglo-American commission, set up by U.S. President William McKinley and Canadian Prime Minister Wilfrid Laurier to resolve the Alaska boundary dispute, end abruptly after it is clear that the U.S. will not make any concessions. In response, Laurier makes clear that there will be no further concessions with the U.S. in trade.
  - The Russian Imperial government removes the privileges of the parliament of Finland.
- February 21
  - The British freighter SS Jumna is last seen passing Rathlin Island off Northern Ireland. Bound from Scotland to deliver a shipment of coal to Uruguay with minimal crew, it never arrives and is never seen again.
  - Under threat of bombardment by the British Royal Navy, Sultan of Oman revokes his concession to the French Navy for a coaling station.
  - The Vicksburg National Military Park is established in Mississippi to preserve the battlefield of the Battle of Vicksburg.
- February 23 – Because of distrubances at the funeral of the late President Faure, parliament members Paul Déroulède, Lucien Millevoye and Marcel Habert are arrested.
- February 25 – In an accident at Grove Hill, Harrow, London, England, Edwin Sewell becomes the world's first driver of a petrol-driven vehicle to be killed; his passenger, Major James Richer, dies of injuries three days later.
- February 26 – Kálmán Széll replaces Dezső Bánffy as Prime Minister of Hungary.
- February 27 – Japanese immigration to South America, primarily Peru, begins as the ship Sakura Maru departs from Yokohama with 790 men employed by the Morioka-shokai Sugar Company. The group arrives in Callao on April 3.
- February 28 – General Juan Reyes, leader of the Nicaraguan insurgency, surrenders at Bluefields to the commanders of USS Marietta and HMS Intrepid.

=== March ===
- March 1 – Juan Lindolfo Cuestas resumes office as President of Uruguay after stepping down for 24 days to allow Senate President José Batlle y Ordóñez to serve as acting president.
- March 2 – Mount Rainier National Park is established in the U.S. state of Washington.
- March 3 – Guglielmo Marconi conducts radio beacon experiments on Salisbury Plain and notices that radio waves are being reflected back to the transmitter by objects they encounter, one of the early steps in the development of radar.
- March 4 –
  - Cyclone Mahina strikes Bathurst Bay, Queensland. A 12-meter-high wave reaches up to 5 km inland, leaving over 400 dead (one of the deadliest natural disasters in Australia's history).
  - Francisco Silvela forms a new cabinet as Prime Minister of Spain, replacing the government of Práxedes Mateo Sagasta.

March 6: Aspirin.

- March 6 – In Berlin, Felix Hoffmann patents Aspirin and Bayer registers its name as a trademark.
- March 8 – The Frankfurter Fußball-Club Victoria von 1899 (predecessor of Eintracht Frankfurt) is founded.
- March 9 – The Senate of the state of Utah adjourns its attempts to elect a new U.S. Senator, after having voted 149 times without a candidate reaching the necessary majority. The term of Frank J. Cannon expired on March 3. Although Alfred W. McCone had come within two votes of getting the necessary 32 required for a majority, his support failed when state representative Albert A. Law claimed the McCone had offered him a bribe to change his vote.
- March 10 – At the Battle of Balantang, the U.S. Army sustains 400 casualties in an attack by Philippine troops.
- March 11
  - The world's first wireless distress signal is sent by wireless telegraphy (in Morse code) to the East Goodwin light vessel when German cargo-carrying barquentine Elbe runs aground in fog in the English Channel.
  - Waldemar Jungner files the patent application for the first alkaline battery and receives a Swedish patent.
- March 13 – Germany, Great Britain and the United States reach an agreement on their jurisdiction in Samoa, following a conference in Washington DC.
- March 14 –
  - After a civil war breaks out in Samoa between Malietoa Tanumafili I (recognized by Germany, the U.K. and the U.S.) and rebels who recognize Mata'afa Iosefo as the island's king, the USS Philadelphia takes control of the capital at Apia.
  - Germany's Parliament votes, 209 to 141, to reject a proposal to increase the size of the nation's army.
- March 15 – The cabinet of Spain's Prime Minister Silvestri approves the ratification of the treaty to end the Spanish–American War. The Queen Regent of Spain signs the treaty two days later.
- March 16 – In the U.S. at Palmetto, Georgia, a lynch mob kills four African-American suspects who had been arrested on suspicion of arson.
- March 17 – A fire kills 86 people at the Windsor Hotel in New York City.
- March 18 – Phoebe, the ninth-known moon of the planet Saturn is discovered by U.S. astronomer William Pickering from analysis of photographic plates made by a Peruvian observatory, the first discovery of a satellite photographically.
- March 19
  - One of the first labor unions for government employees is formed with the organization in Denmark of the Copenhagen Municipal Workers' Union
  - The Battle of Taguig takes place in the Philippines as the USS Laguna de Bay bombards the Katipunan stronghold.
  - A tornado outbreak in the southern U.S. kills multiple people.
- March 20 – At Sing Sing prison in Ossining, New York, Martha M. Place becomes the first woman to be executed in an electric chair.
- March 21 –
  - The Eden Theatre in La Ciotat, a commune in France near Marseille, lays a claim to being the first cinema as brothers Auguste Lumière and Louis Lumière present their short film, L'Arrivée d'un train en gare de La Ciotat ("The Arrival of a Train at La Ciotat Station") to 250 surprised spectators.
  - The French Court of Cassation orders the submission of the file on the Dreyfus case.
  - A report documented that bubonic plague reached Medina and another report noted that at least 21 cases of the plague.
- March 22 – Malietoa Tanus is crowned as King of Samoa.
- March 23 – Samoan villages held by Chief Mataafa are bombarded by USS Philadelphia and HMS Porpoise and HMS Royalist following the attack on Samoan natives in Apia.
- March 24 – The U.S. Ambassador to Argentina, acting as arbitrator of a boundary dispute between Argentina and Chile, awards the disputed territory to Chile.
- March 26 – In the first major action in the Malolos Campaign in the Philippine–American War, 90 Filipino soldiers are killed in the Battle of the Meycauayan bridge.
- March 27
  - Guglielmo Marconi successfully transmits a radio signal across the English Channel.
  - In the Battle of Marilao River, Filipino forces under the personal command of Emilio Aguinaldo fail to prevent troops of the United States Army crossing the river.
- March 30 – The British steamer Stella sinks in the English Channel with the loss of 80 people after wrecking against Les Casquets.
- March 31
  - The United Kingdom announces that it has completed the purchase of rights to occupy the Kingdom of Tonga.
  - In the Philippine–American War, Malolos, capital of the First Philippine Republic, is captured by American forces.

=== April ===
- April 1 – The Second Battle of Vailele takes place in Samoa as rebels loyal to King Mata'afa Iosefo force the retreat of American and British troops loyal to Prince Tanumafili.
- April 4 –
  - Cuba's General Assembly votes to disband the Cuban army and to dissolve to accept U.S. sovereignty.
  - The British Antarctic Expedition reports discovery of new land in the Weddell Sea at a latitude of 71 36" S.
- April 5 – A team of prospectors sets out from Northern Rhodesia to explore the minerals of central Africa for the British company Tanganyika Concessions (TCL). Discovering that the most valuable copper deposits are in the Congo Free State, TCL makes an unsuccessful attempt to purchase full rights from King Leopold of Belgium.
- April 6 – Services are held at Arlington National Cemetery for the burial of 336 American soldiers who died in Cuba and Puerto Rico.
- April 7 –
  - The Shootout at Wilson Ranch, the last major gunfight of the Wild West era in the U.S., takes place in Tombstone, Arizona. Brothers William Halderman and Thomas Halderman, kill two lawmen. They will be hanged on November 16, 1900.
  - Marconi's wireless system is successfully tested across the English Channel during a thunderstorm.
- April 8 – A flood caused by the collapse of an ice gorge in the Yellowstone River drowns 12 people near Glendive, Montana.
- April 9
  - In Uganda, King Chwa II Kabalega of the Bunyoro kingdom, a leader of the fight against British colonial occupation, is taken prisoner after being shot in a battle near Hoima. Kabalega is exiled to the Seychelles and remains there until 1923.
  - The Greek ship Maria sinks after a collision sith the British steamer Kingswell in the Mediterranean and 45 people drown.
  - The Battle of Santa Cruz begins in the Philippines between U.S. Army troops and nationalists of the First Philippine Republic. After a two-day battle, 93 Filipino fighters and one American soldier are dead.
- April 10 – Seven people are shot and killed in a gun battle at the Springside Mine at Pana, Illinois, between striking white union coal miners and African-Americans hired as strikebreakers.
- April 11 – U.S. President William McKinley declares the Spanish–American War to be at an end as the Treaty of Paris between the U.S. and Spain goes into effect. Puerto Rico, the Philippines and Guam are ceded to the U.S. and Cuba becomes an American protectorate.
- April 12 –
  - Bolivia's President Severo Fernández is overthrown in a military coup d'état led by General José Manuel Pando.
  - Georgios Theotokis becomes the new Prime Minister of Greece, succeeding Alexandros Zaimis.
- April 13 – The British freighter City of York departs from San Francisco with a crew of 27 and a cargo of timber bound for Fremantle, but never reaches its destination, wrecking on the reefs at Rottnest Island.
- April 14 – British Army troops in Hong Kong attack the Walled City of Kowloon, based on intelligence that Chinese Imperial Army troops have been stationed behind the walls to subvert Britain's 1898 lease.
- April 16 –
  - Britain formally claims possession of the "New Territories" as an extension of its lease of Hong Kong to cover the area south of the Sham Chun River and 230 islands in Kowloon Bay.
  - General elections are held in Spain for the members of the Spanish parliament, the Cortes.
- April 17 – The first elections for the 10-member Legislative Council of the British colony of Southern Rhodesia (now Zimbabwe), limited to European candidates and voters.
- April 18 – The 15-member crew of USS Yorkdown are ambushed at Baler in the Philippines and captured by Filipino insurgents while trying to rescue a besieged Spanish garrison.
- April 19 – France adds the Kingdom of Laos, a protectorate since 1893, to the existing colony of French Indochina.
- April 20 – Catulle Mendès' controversial ballet Le Cygne premieres at the Opéra-Comique in Paris, but is considered by critics to be too sexually explicit.
- April 21 – The nova V606 Aquilae is first observed from Earth as seen within the constellation Aquila.
- April 22 – In aid of the Royal Niger Company, the British Army begins an invasion of Esanland, in Nigeria, to halt the resistance of the Esan chiefs to European rule. After Benin's King Ologbosere is overcome, the British attack the kingdom at Ekpoma.
- April 23 – The steamship General Whitney sinks off the coast of St. Augustine, Florida. While everyone on board escapes in lifeboats, one of the boats capsizes, drowning the captain and 16 other crew.
- April 24 – The Scottish ship Loch Sloy is wrecked off the coast of Australia's Kangaroo Island, drowning 32 people on board.

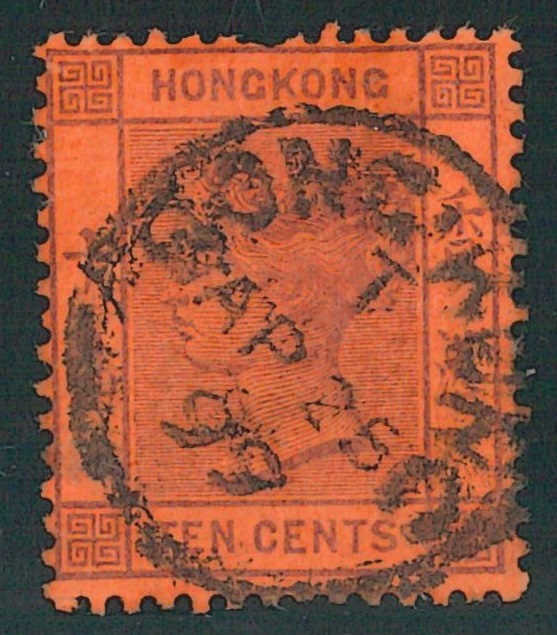
A datestamp created in Victoria, Hong Kong on 25 April 1899

- April 26 – Jean Sibelius conducts the world première of his Symphony No. 1 in Helsinki.
- April 27 –
  - The Samoan chieftain Maataafa declares an armistice but Germany declines to agree to it.
  - A tornado in the U.S. kills numerous people in Kirksville and Newtown, Missouri.
- April 28 – The United Kingdom and the Russian Empire sign the Anglo-Russian Agreement formalizing their spheres of influence in China, essentially agreeing that Britain will not seek railway concessions north of the Great Wall of China, and Russia will avoid doing the same in the Yangtze River valley in southern China.
- April 29 –
  - Camille Jenatzy of Belgium becomes the first person to drive faster than 100 kilometers per hour, powering his electric racecar at 105.88 kilometres per hour (65.79 mph) at a track at Achères.
  - In the U.S., several hundred miners capture a railroad train at Coeur d'Alene, Idaho, arm themselves with guns and dynamite, and advance on the town of Wardner, Idaho, destroying property of mining ccompanies that employ non-unon labor.

=== May ===
- May 1 –
  - Britain's Prime Minister announces in the House of Commons that the government has not been able to reach an agreement with Cecil Rhodes on plans for a Cape Town to Cairo railroad across Africa.
  - The natural gas companies of New York City cut prices by 60% from $1.25 to 50 cents per 1,000 cubic feet.
- May 2 – The Kingdom of Siam (modern-day Thailand) cedes its province of Luang Prabang (now Laos) to France.
- May 3 –
  - Coeur d'Alene, Idaho labor confrontation of 1899: U.S. troops arrive at Wardner, Idaho, and arrest hundreds of suspected rioters.
  - The Ferencvárosi TC Association football club is founded in Budapest.
- May 4 – German inventor John Matthias Stroh applies for the patent for his new invention, the "Stroh violin". A British patent is granted on March 24, 1900.
- May 8 – In the French West African colony of Niger, Paul Voulet massacres the Hausa inhabitants of the village of Birni-N'Konni in retaliation for the continued resistance of Queen Sarraounia.
- May 9 – The sultanate of Morocco settles the claims of the U.S. against it, and the cruiser USS Chicago departs from Tangier.
- May 10 – Finnish farmworker Karl Emil Malmelin kills seven people with an axe at the Simola croft in the village of Klaukkala.
- May 11 –Pope Leo XIII declares that 1900 will be a jubilee year.
- May 13
  - A train wreck near Reading, Pennsylvania kills 28 people and injures 50.
  - The Esporte Clube Vitória football club is founded in Salvador, Brazil.
- May 14 –
  - All of the remaining Spanish soldiers in ports of the Philippines are withdrawn.
  - The three time world champion Club Nacional de Football is founded in Montevideo, Uruguay.
- May 16 – British troops in the leased Chinese territory of Hong Kong take control of the city of Kowloon.
- May 17 – Britain's Queen Victoria lays the foundation stone for the Victoria and Albert Museum.
- May 18 – The First Hague Peace Conference, initiated by Emperor Nicholas II of Russia, is opened in The Hague by Willem de Beaufort, Minister of Foreign Affairs of the Netherlands.
- May 20 – The American Physical Society is founded at a meeting at Columbia University.
- May 24 – Jules Massenet's Cendrillon, the first opera based on the fairy tale of Cinderella, premieres in Paris at the Opéra-Comique in Paris.
- May 27
  - Rangers F.C., one of the most successful teams in the Scottish Football League, is incorporated.
  - Maurice Ravel conducts the first public performance of his Shéhérazade, ouverture de féerie in Paris.
- May 31
  - The Harriman Alaska Expedition is launched.
  - The Bloemfontein Conference commences between Paul Kruger and Sir Alfred Milner in the Orange Free State, but ends in failure after six days.

=== June ===
- June 2 – American outlaws Robert L. Parker (Butch Cassidy) and Harry A. Longabaugh ("The Sundance Kid") commit their first armed robbery as "The Wild Bunch", stopping a Union Pacific train near Wilcox, Wyoming, with accomplices Harvey Logan and Elzy Lay, and steal more than $30,000 worth of cargo.
- June 3
  - Dreyfus affair: France's Court of Cassation orders a reopening of the 1894 conviction for treason of French Army Captain Alfred Dreyfus after evidence of a wrongful conviction is made public, and directs that Dreyfus be returned to France after five years of imprisonment on Devil's Island.
  - The United States and Spain resume diplomatic relations, as U.S. President McKinley receives the Duke of Arcos as the new Minister for Spain.
- June 5 – Lieutenant General Antonio Luna, Commander of the Philippine Republican Army, is assassinated along with his chief aide, Colonel Paco Román, after being lured to Cabanatuan by President Emilio Aguinaldo.
- June 9 – American boxer James J. Jeffries wins the world heavyweight boxing championship when he knocks out Cornish-born Bob Fitzsimmons at Coney Island, New York.
- June 10 – Under the terms of the Samoa Tripartite Convention, Germany, the United Kingdom and the United States form a colonial government to administer a protectorate over the islands of Samoa. The government lasts less than nine months, and Germany annexes the western part of Samoa on March 1, 1900, leaving the U.S. to control what becomes American Samoa.
- June 11 – Pope Leo XIII issues a declaration of the consecration of the entire human race to the Sacred Heart of Jesus. The consecration follows the issuance of his papal encyclical Annum sacrum, declaring 1900 to be a Holy Year and directing all Roman Catholic churches in the world to implement the Prayer of Consecration to the Sacred Heart during the period of June 9 to June 11, 1899.
- June 12 – The New Richmond tornado completely destroys the town of New Richmond, Wisconsin, killing 117 and injuring more than 200.
- June 13 – The village of Herman, Nebraska, with a population of 319, is destroyed by a tornado and 40 people are killed.
- June 15
  - Sweden's Department of Foreign Affairs hosts a conference for delegates from Germany, Denmark, Norway, the UK, the Netherlands, Russia and Sweden to make agreements on fishing in the Arctic Ocean, the Baltic Sea and the North Sea.
  - The French expedition to liberate Chad, arrives at Kouno, where the commander, Henri Bretonnet, meets with the Gaourang II, the Muslim Sultan of Bagirmi.
  - Cycle & Carriage, now one of the largest investment companies in Singapore, is founded, initially to sell bicycles and motor vehicles.
- June 17 – David Hilbert creates the modern concept of geometry, with the publication of his book Grundlagen der Geometrie, released at Göttingen.
- June 18 – The Federación Libre de Trabajadores is created in Puerto Rico as a resistance movement against the United States.
- June 19
  - The Anglo-Egyptian Sudan is created, to be a territory to be administered jointly by Egypt and the United Kingdom, through an Egyptian governor-general appointed with consent of the UK, although in practice it becomes administered as part of the British Empire.
  - Edward Elgar's Enigma Variations are premiered in London.
- June 21 – "Treaty 8", the most comprehensive of the eleven Numbered Treaties, is signed between the British Crown on behalf of Canada, with various Cree groups of the First Nations, ceding 320,000 square miles (830,000 km^{2}) of land in the northern parts of Alberta, Saskatchewan, and British Columbia, as well as a portion of the Northwest Territories, to the Canadian government.
- June 24 – Spain cedes its last Pacific Ocean colonies, the Caroline Islands (later part of the Federated States of Micronesia, the Ladrone islands of Ladrone (later part of the Mariana Islands), and Palau, to Germany.
- June 26 – Joseph Chamberlain sets into motion the Second Boer War after receiving an appeal from the British Cape Colony in South Africa to help British subjects oppressed in the Transvaal Republic.
- June 27
  - A patent for a form of paperclip is applied for by Norwegian inventor Johan Vaaler but it is never put into production.
  - A. E. J. Collins, a 13-year-old schoolboy, makes the highest-ever recorded individual score in cricket, 628 not out. His record will stand for 117 years.
- June 28 – In Nigeria, British authorities publicly hang King Ologbosere Irabor outside of the courthouse at Benin City, after he was convicted of ordering the massacre of a party dispatched by the British consul.
- June 30 – 'Mile-a-Minute Murphy' earns his nickname after he becomes the first man to ride a bicycle for one-mile (1.6 km) in under a minute, on Long Island. Murphy pedals his bike one mile in 57.8 seconds for an average speed of 62.28 miles per hour.

=== July ===
- July 1
  - The International Council of Nurses is founded in London.
  - The German domestic appliance company Miele is founded.
- July 3 – Swiss-born American boxer Frank Erne wins the world lightweight championship by defeating champion George "Kid" Lavigne in Buffalo, New York.
- July 4 – The most famous skeleton of a dinosaur ever found intact, a diplodocus, is discovered at the Sheep Creek Quarry near Medicine Bow, Wyoming. The expedition team, financed by Andrew Carnegie for the Carnegie Museum of Natural History and led by William Harlow Reed, bestows the name "Dippy" on the Diplodocus carnegii. It becomes well known after Carnegie has plaster cast replicas made for donation to museums all over the world.
- July 5 – The 1895 Trade and Navigation agreement between the Japanese and Russian empires goes into effect, with each country was given "a full freedom of ship and cargo entrance to all places, ports, and rivers on the other country's territory."
- July 7 – The Great Lakes Towing Company is incorporated by John D. Rockefeller and William G. Mather to acquire more than 150 tugboats to control shipping in four of the North American Great Lakes and quickly builds a monopoly on Great Lakes traffic.
- July 8 – The Lorelei Fountain is unveiled in The Bronx in New York City.
- July 10 – British colonial authorities in the Anglo-Egyptian Sudan give control of the Red Sea port of Suakin to Sudan, after having agreed that Egypt would have the right to administer commerce there.
- July 11 – In Turin, Giovanni Agnelli and eight investors form the Italian automobile manufacturer F.I.A.T., producers of the Fiat motor vehicles.
- July 12 – The British freight ship City of York sinks after striking reefs at Rottnest Island, due to a misunderstanding of signal flare fired from the island's lighthouse. The ship, which was nearing the end of a voyage from San Francisco to Fremantle, Western Australia, evacuates its men in two lifeboats, but one of the boats overturns and 11 men, including the captain, drown.
- July 13 – A tornado kills 13 people in the U.S. village of Herman, Nebraska.
- July 14 – The first Republic of Acre is declared by former Spanish journalist Luis Gálvez Rodríguez de Arias in the Amazon jungle in South America, and lasts for nine months.
- July 17
  - NEC Corporation is organized as the first Japanese joint venture with foreign capital.
  - In the Battle of Togbao in Chad, the French Bretonnet–Braun mission is destroyed by the warlord Rabih az-Zubayr.
  - The Anglo-Japanese Treaty of Commerce and Navigation takes effect, ending extraterritoriality and the unequal status of Japan in foreign commerce.
- July 18 – The patent for the first sofa bed is taken out by African-American inventor Leonard C. Bailey. He receives a U.S. patent on June 2, 1900.
- July 20 – Park Row Building in New York City is completed. It is the world's tallest building until 1908.
- July 24 – In the first trade treaty signed by the U.S. after the passage of the Dingley Act, France and the United States sign an agreement for a 20% reduction of France's existing tariffs on 635 items, in return for the U.S. reduction between 5% and 20% of duty fees on 126 items.
- July 26 – The President of the Dominican Republic, dictator Ulises Heureaux, is assassinated during a visit to the city of Moca.
- July 29 – The first international Peace Conference ends, with the signing of the First Hague Convention.
- July 30 – The Harriman Alaska Expedition ends.
- July 31 – Duke of York Island, off Antarctica, is discovered by the Southern Cross Expedition.

=== August ===
- August 3 – The John Marshall Law School is founded in Chicago.
- August 4 – Japan rescinds its policy of extraterritoriality privileges to western nations that had operated consular courts to try cases against western nationals under western law.
- August 5 – Automotive mechanic Henry Ford incorporates the Detroit Automobile Company. While the company failed, it establishes Detroit, Michigan, as the site for U.S. car manufacturing and provided a model for the Ford Motor Company.
- August 6 – Near Stratford, Connecticut, 36 people are killed when a trolley falls off of a trestle and lands upside down in a pond 40 feet below.
- August 7
  - Dreyfus affair: The retrial of French Army Captain Alfred Dreyfus before a court-martial opens.
  - Governance of the island of Guam, under the administration of the United States Department of the Navy, begins.
- August 8 – The San Ciriaco hurricane strikes Puerto Rico and leaves 250,000 people homeless. The official death toll is later listed as 3,369 people.
- August 10 – Marshall "Major" Taylor wins the world 1-mile (1.6 km) professional cycling championship in Montreal, securing his place as the first African American world champion in any sport.
- August 12 – South African Republic General Jan Smuts makes a final initiative to avert the outbreak of what will become the Second Boer War, meeting in Pretoria with the British chargé d'affaires, Conyngham Greene.
- August 13 – The battle for the Philippine city of Angeles begins. The U.S. captures the area, the future site of Clark Air Force Base, by August 16.
- August 17 – Emperor Gojong of Korea issues the 9-article International Declaration declaring that, as "the great emperor of Korea", he has "infinite military authority" as well as absolute power to enact laws.
- August 18 – Llest Colliery explosion at Pontyrhyl in the South Wales coalfield of the U.K. kills 19 miners.
- August 20 – The Kiram–Bates Treaty is signed in the Philippines, with U.S. forces recognizing the autonomy of local governments in the Sulu Archipelago (within the Mindanao island group) in return for the Sultan's assistance in suppressing attacks on U.S. forces.
- August 23 – The first ship-to-shore test of a wireless radio transmission is made from the U.S. lightship LV 70, with the sending of Morse code signals to a receiving station near San Francisco.
- August 28 – At least 512 people are killed when a debris hill from the Sumitomo Besshi copper mine at Niihama, Shikoku, Japan, collapses.
- August 30 – After taking over the second-largest city in the Dominican Republic, Santiago de los Caballeros, revolutionists proclaim Horacio Vásquez as the nation's president in rebel-controlled territory. At the same time in the capital at Santo Domingo, president Wenceslao Figuereo steps down after only five weeks in office.
- August 31 – The Olympique de Marseille association football club is founded in France.

=== September ===
- September 5 – General Horacio Vasquez, leader of a revolution against the Dominican Republic's President Wenceslao Figuereo, arrives at the capital, Santo Domingo and forms a provisional government.
- September 9 – Dreyfus affair: In the retrial of his court-martial, Alfred Dreyfus is again found guilty of treason and sentenced to serve the remaining 10 years of his prison sentence on Devils Island, notwithstanding that the real culprit has previously admitted to his actions.
- September 11 – Northern Arizona University is founded in Flagstaff, as Northern Arizona Normal School.
- September 13
  - Halford Mackinder, Cesar Ollier and Josef Brocherel make the first ascent of Batian, the highest peak of Mount Kenya.
  - The French Army invades the Sultanate of Zinder in Niger and kills the ruler, Amadou Kouran Daga.
- September 14 – General Cipriano Castro defeats the Venezuelan Army at the battle of Tocuyito and prepares to march to Caracas to overthrow President Ignacio Andrade.
- September 15 – Preparing for an attack on Britain's Cape Colony from the neighboring Transvaal Republic, Robert Baden-Powell arrives at the border town of Mafeking and begins recruiting volunteers and stockpiling munitions to prepare for an attack and siege.
- September 19
  - Dreyfus affair: Alfred Dreyfus is pardoned in France by the Ministry of War. He is released from prison at Rennes the following day but not fully exonerated until 1906.
  - The patent for the first water meter is granted to Edwin Ford.
- September 21
  - A special session of the Orange Free State's parliament meets at Bloemfontein to discuss war with the British Empire. At the same time, three British transports depart from Bombay with troops to the Cape Colony.
  - The Dominion Line steamer Scotsman sinks in the Strait of Belle Isle, killing 15 women and children.
- September 25 – A Serbian court sentences 30 people convicted for conspiracy to attempt to assassinate the former King Milan, with the two leaders being sentenced to death.
- September 26 – General Manuel Guzman Alvarez of the Venezuelan state of Sucre joins with General Cipriano Castro in a revolt against the Venezuelan government.
- September 28 – Austrian auto designer Ferdinand Porsche attracts worldwide attention when his first car, the Porsche P1, wins the Berlin Road Race 18 minutes ahead of the second-place finisher.
- September 29 – The Veterans of Foreign Wars (VFW) is founded in the U.S. by Spanish–American War veteran James C. Putnam as the American Veterans of Foreign Service.
- September 30 – The 1899 Ceram earthquake kills 3,864 people on Seram Island, through a tsunami after a 7.8 magnitude earthquake. The villages of Paulohy-Samasuru and Mani, with a combined population of 2,400 people, are swept away by a 29 foot (8.8 m) wave.

=== October ===
- October 1 – Possession of the Mariana Islands is formally transferred from Spain to Germany, which purchased the archipelago (with the exception of Guam) from Spain for 837,500 German gold marks and become part of German New Guinea.
- October 3 – The boundary dispute between Venezuela and British Guiana is resolved by a binding award from the International Tribunal of Arbitration of five neutral jurists agreed upon by the United Kingdom and the United Venezuelan States.
- October 8 – The South African Republic telegraphs a three-day ultimatum to the U.K., demanding an arbitration of issues and a pullback of troops from the borders between the Republic and the adjoining Cape Colony, Natal and Bechuanaland by October 11.
- October 10 – The French Sudan is divided into two smaller administrative units, Middle Niger (which later becomes the nations of Niger and Gambia) and Upper Senegal (which becomes the nations of Senegal and Mali)
- October 11 – In South Africa, the Second Boer War between the United Kingdom and the Boers of the Transvaal and Orange Free State begins as the Boers invade the British colony of Natal.
- October 13 – The Second Boer War extends into the British Bechuanaland Protectorate (modern-day Botswana) as the siege of Mafeking begins.
- October 14 – The Boer invasion of the Cape Colony begins with the siege of Kimberley.
- October 15 – French Army officer Ferdinand de Béhagle is put to death by Sudanese warlord Rabih az-Zubayr, prompting a French expedition to be led against Rabih.
- October 17 – The Thousand Days' War begins in Colombia as Colombian Liberal Party soldiers led by General Rafael Uribe Uribe, with support from Venezuela, begin a fight against the government of National Party president Manuel Antonio Sanclemente. The war will continue for 1,130 days.
- October 18 – The Boxer Rebellion begins in China as the Battle of Senluo Temple is fought between more than 4,000 Imperial Chinese Army troops and at least 1,000 rebels from the Society of Righteous and Harmonious Fists.
- October 19
  - Robert H. Goddard receives his inspiration to develop the first rocket capable of reaching outer space, after viewing his yard from high in a tree and imagining "how wonderful it would be to make some device which had even the possibility of ascending to Mars, and how it would look on a small scale, if sent up from the meadow at my feet."
  - Boer troops commanded by Johannes Kock capture the railway station in Elandslaagte and cut the telegraph line between the British Army headquarters at Ladysmith and its station at Dundee.
- October 20 – In the first major clash of the Second Boer War, the Battle of Talana Hill, the British Army drives the Boers from a hilltop position, but with heavy casualties, including their commanding general Sir Penn Symons.
- October 21 – The Battle of Elandslaagte is fought in Natal, as the British Army recaptures the railway station from Boers, then proceeds toward the fortress of Ladysmith. South African General Jan Kock is fatally wounded in the battle and dies 10 days later.
- October 24
  - The sinking of the ship Cisneros by the Colombian Navy warship Hércules drowns more than 200 Liberal rebels during the Battle of Magdalena River.
  - President Steyn of the South African Republic proclaims the annexation of the northern portion of the Cape Colony above the Vaal River.
- October 26
  - Indirect fire is used for the first time in battle. British gunners in the Second Boer War fire a cannon on a high trajectory toward the Boer Army, with the objective of having the shell come down on the enemy.
  - The foundering of the British steamer Zurich off of the coast of Norway kills 16 of the 17 crew aboard, with only the captain surviving.
- October 29 – The Battle of Kouno ends after two days in Chad, as French Army Captain Émile Gentil leads a force of 344 troops against a much larger force of Sudanese Arabs, led by the warlord Rabih az-Zubayr. Gentil routs the Sudanese.
- October 30 – The Battle of Ladysmith begins as British troops at the Ladysmith fort attempt to make a preemptive strike against a larger force of South African Republic and Orange Free State troops that is gradually surrounding the fort. After sustaining 400 casualties and having 800 men captured, the British retreat to the fort where a 118-day siege begins on November 2.

=== November ===
- November 2 – The siege of Ladysmith begins as armies of the two Boer republics cut telegraph lines connecting Ladysmith to the British colony, and try over the next 118 days to starve out the British force. The British defenders will hold the fort without surrendering, until the siege is broken on February 28, 1900 by a force led by Redvers Buller.
- November 4 – The Alpha Sigma Tau sorority is founded in Ypsilanti, Michigan.
- November 5
  - The U.S. Army wins the battle to capture the Philippine Republic's capital at Angeles City, after nearly three months of fighting. It also captures the Philippine stronghold of Magalang.
  - The Belgian Antarctic Expedition is concluded.
- November 6 – The Boers begin the shelling of the British settlement at Mafeking.
- November 7
  - Representatives of the U.S., the UK and Germany sign a treaty for arbitration of Samoa's claims for damages, with King Oscar of Sweden and Norway agreeing to become the neutral arbitrator.
  - Joshua Lionel Cohen is awarded a U.S. patent for the flash-lamp.
  - (October 26 Old Style) – Anton Chekhov's Uncle Vanya receives its Russian metropolitan première at the Moscow Art Theatre.

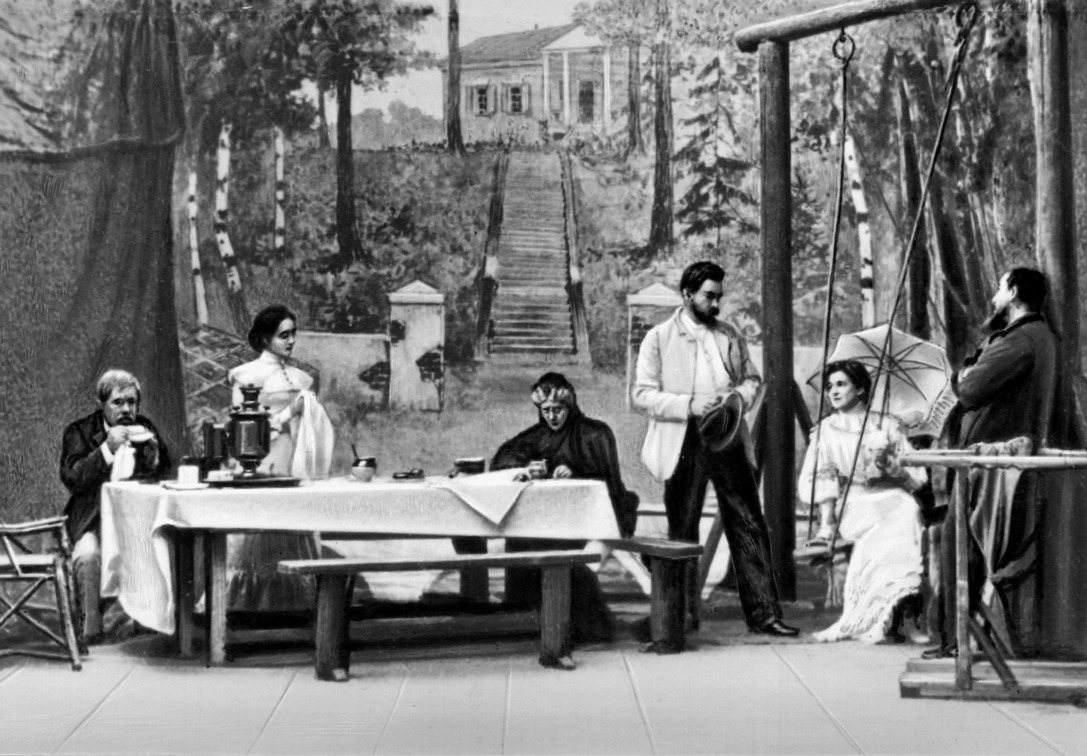
Moscow Art Theatre production of Uncle Vanya

- November 8 – The Bronx Zoological Park opens in New York City.
- November 9 – The Boer attack on Ladysmith is repulsed by British artillery, with the Boers sustaining 800 killed and wounded.
- November 11 – The Battle of San Jacinto is fought in the Philippines. The battle demonstrates the limitations to the heavy, wheel-mounted Gatling gun, in uneven territory.
- November 12 – The city of Puerto Cabello in Venezuela surrenders to General Cipriano Castro after heavy fighting.
- November 13 – In Colombia's Thousand Days' War, the Battle of Bucaramanga ends with a victory of conservative forces over Liberal Party rebels.
- November 14 – The first aerial crossing of the Mediterranean Sea is made by Louis Capazza and Alphonse Fondère in Capazza's balloon.
- November 15 – The American Line's SS St. Paul becomes the first ocean liner to report her imminent arrival by wireless telegraphy.
- November 21 – Garret Hobart, Vice President of the United States since 1897 for President William McKinley, dies of cardiovascular disease. The vacancy in the office will remain unfilled until the inauguration of Theodore Roosevelt as vice president in 1901.
- November 20 – The U.S. Supreme Court issues its decision in Brown v. New Jersey (175 U.S. 172) and upholds the constitutionality of the "struck jury" method of selecting jurors.
- November 25 – The Battle of Umm Diwaykarat, a decisive British and Egyptian victory, ends the Mahdist War in the Sudan, as the Khalifa of Sudan, Abdallahi ibn Muhammad, is killed.
- November 28
  - The British Army sustains heavy losses in the Battle of Modder River, despite routing the Boers.
  - The Philippine Republic capital at Bayambang surrenders as the government flees the Fourth Cavalry of the U.S. Army.
- November 29 – The FC Barcelona association football club is founded.
- November 30 – The first women to serve, in uniform, in the armed forces of any nation begins service as part of the Canadian Militia Expeditionary Force to Cape Town to serve in the Boer War. Georgina Fane Pope and three other women are enlisted as army nurses.

=== December ===
- December 2
  - Philippine–American War – Battle of Tirad Pass ("The Filipino Thermopylae"): General Gregorio del Pilar and his troops are able to guard the retreat of Philippine President Emilio Aguinaldo, before being wiped out.
  - During the new moon, a near-grand conjunction of the classical planets and several binocular Solar System bodies occur. The Sun, Moon, Mercury, Mars and Saturn are all within 15° of each other, with Venus 5° ahead of this conjunction and Jupiter 15° behind.
- December 9 – An explosion kills 32 coal miners at the Carbon Hill mines in Carbonado, Washington.
- December 10
  - Four-month-old Sobhuza II begins his 82-year reign as King of Swaziland.
  - Battle of Stormberg: The British Army makes a disastrous attempt to surprise the Boer position in Natal and suffers 687 losses.
  - The college fraternity Delta Sigma Phi is founded at the City College of New York.
- December 11 – Second Boer War: Battle of Magersfontein – Boers defeat British forces trying to relieve the Siege of Kimberley.
- December 13 – General French routs Boer troops that had been advancing into the Cape Colony toward Noupoort.
- December 15
  - Battle of Colenso: Britain's General Buller loses 1,097 officers and men in Natal, the third serious British reverse in South Africa in this "Black Week".
  - Glasgow School of Art, the most notable work of Scottish architect Charles Rennie Mackintosh, opens.
- December 16 – The Association football club A.C. Milan is founded.
- December 18 – The British War Office sends Lord Roberts to South Africa to become the commander of British forces, with Lord Kitchener to be second in command, with 100,000 additional men.
- December 22
  - More than 40 schoolchildren from Belgium drown in the capsizing of a boat near the French town of Frelinghien.
  - A fire kills 16 children in Quincy, Illinois.
- December 23 – 40 coal miners are killed in an explosion near Brownsville, Pennsylvania.
- December 24 – The wreck of the British steamship Ariosto off the coast of Hatteras, North Carolina drowns 21 of the crew.

=== Date unknown ===
- Riro, last of the Kings of Easter Island, on a visit to Valparaíso, Chile, dies either from alcohol poisoning, or an assassination plot by the Chilean government.
- Oxo beef stock cubes are introduced, by Liebig's Extract of Meat Company.
- Giros-Loucheur Group, predecessor of Vinci, a worldwide construction and infrastructure industry, founded in France.
- Timken Roller Bearing Company, predecessor of worldwide parts brand Timken, is founded in Missouri.
- The 1899–1923 cholera pandemic begins, spreading to Europe, Asia and Africa.
- A particularly severe flood hits many water areas in Finland. The water level of many lakes, such as lake Saimaa, reach extraordinary heights, which are marked on the coastal cliffs to this day. In Finland the flood is called the Oathbreaker's flood because it coincided with severe dissatisfaction with the emperor Nicholas II among the Finns.

== Births ==
=== January ===
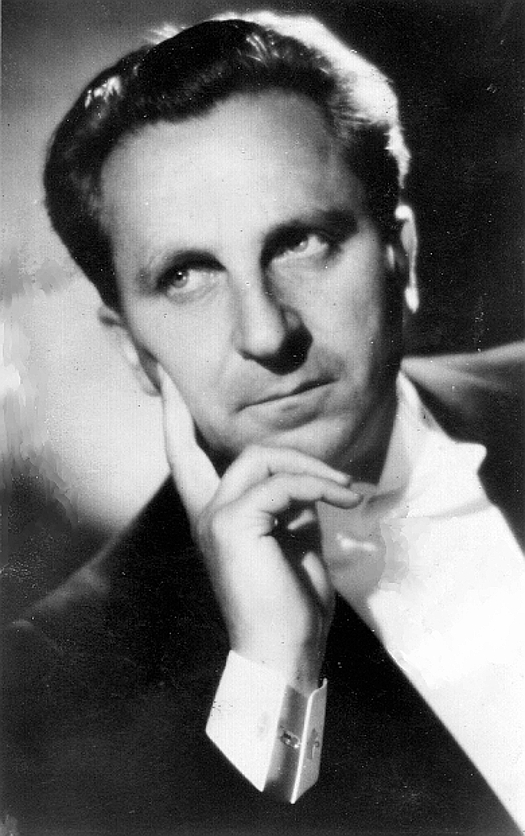
Antal Páger

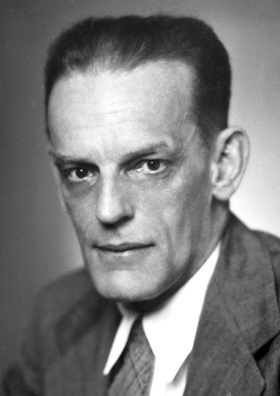
Max Theiler

- January 1 – Jack Beresford, British Olympic rower (d. 1977)
- January 6 – Heinrich Nordhoff, German automotive engineer (d. 1968)
- January 7 – Francis Poulenc, French composer (d. 1963)
- January 8 – S. W. R. D. Bandaranaike, 4th Prime Minister of Sri Lanka (d. 1959)
- January 11 – Eva Le Gallienne, English actress (d. 1991)
- January 12 – Paul Hermann Müller, Swiss chemist, recipient of the Nobel Prize in Physiology or Medicine (d. 1965)
- January 14 – Carlos P. Romulo, Filipino diplomat (d. 1985)
- January 15 – Goodman Ace, American actor, comedian and writer (d. 1982)
- January 17
  - Al Capone, American gangster (d. 1947)
  - Nevil Shute, English-born novelist (d. 1960)
- January 21 – John Bodkin Adams, British physician acquitted of murder (d. 1983)
- January 23 – Tom Denning, Baron Denning, English lawyer, judge and Master of the Rolls (d. 1999)
- January 25 – Paul-Henri Spaak, 31st Prime Minister of Belgium and 2nd secretary general of NATO (d. 1972)
- January 27 – Béla Guttmann, Hungarian-born Association football coach (d. 1981)
- January 29 – Antal Páger, Hungarian actor (d. 1986)
- January 30 – Max Theiler, South African virologist, recipient of the Nobel Prize in Physiology or Medicine (d. 1972)

=== February ===
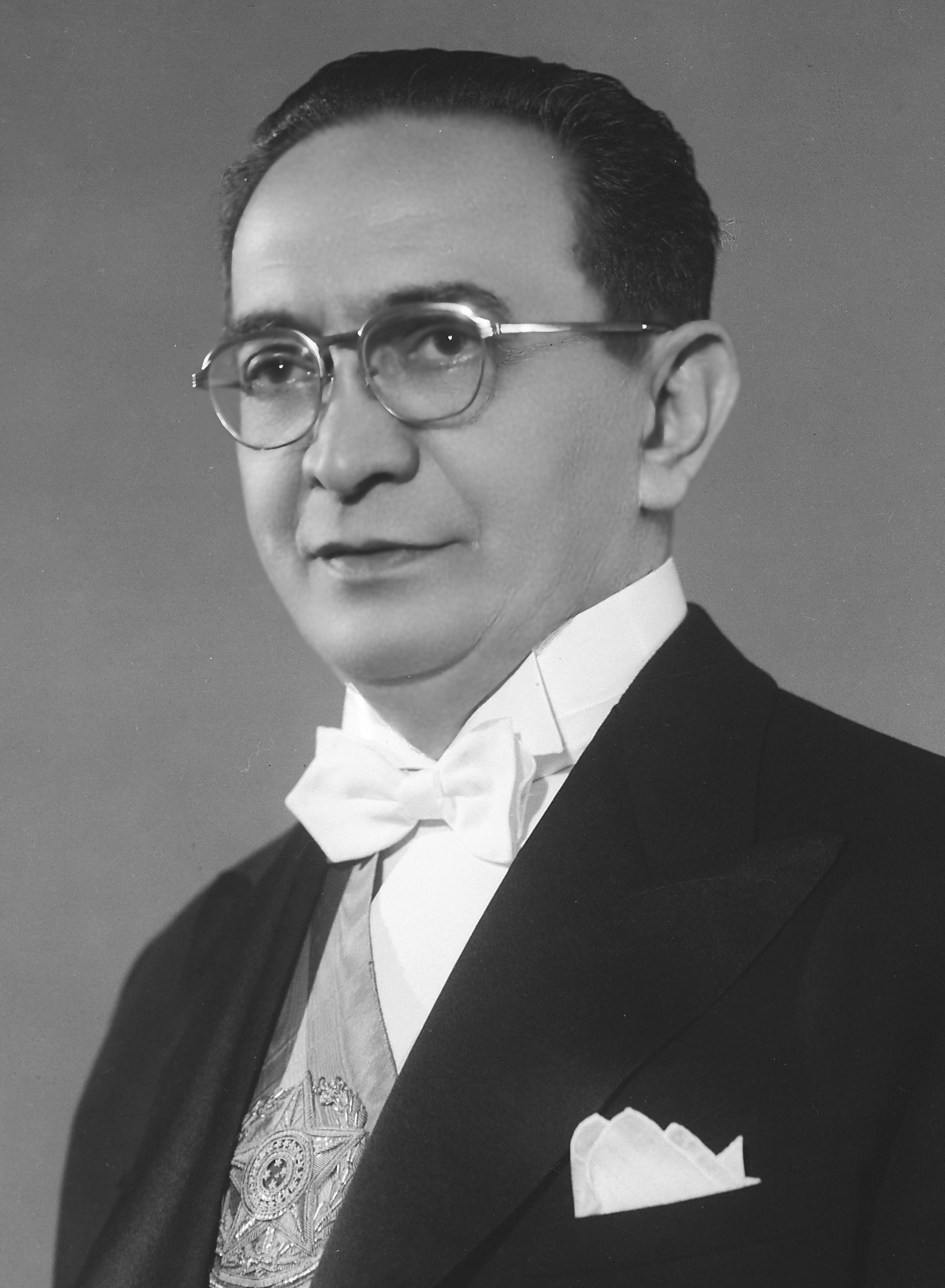
Café Filho

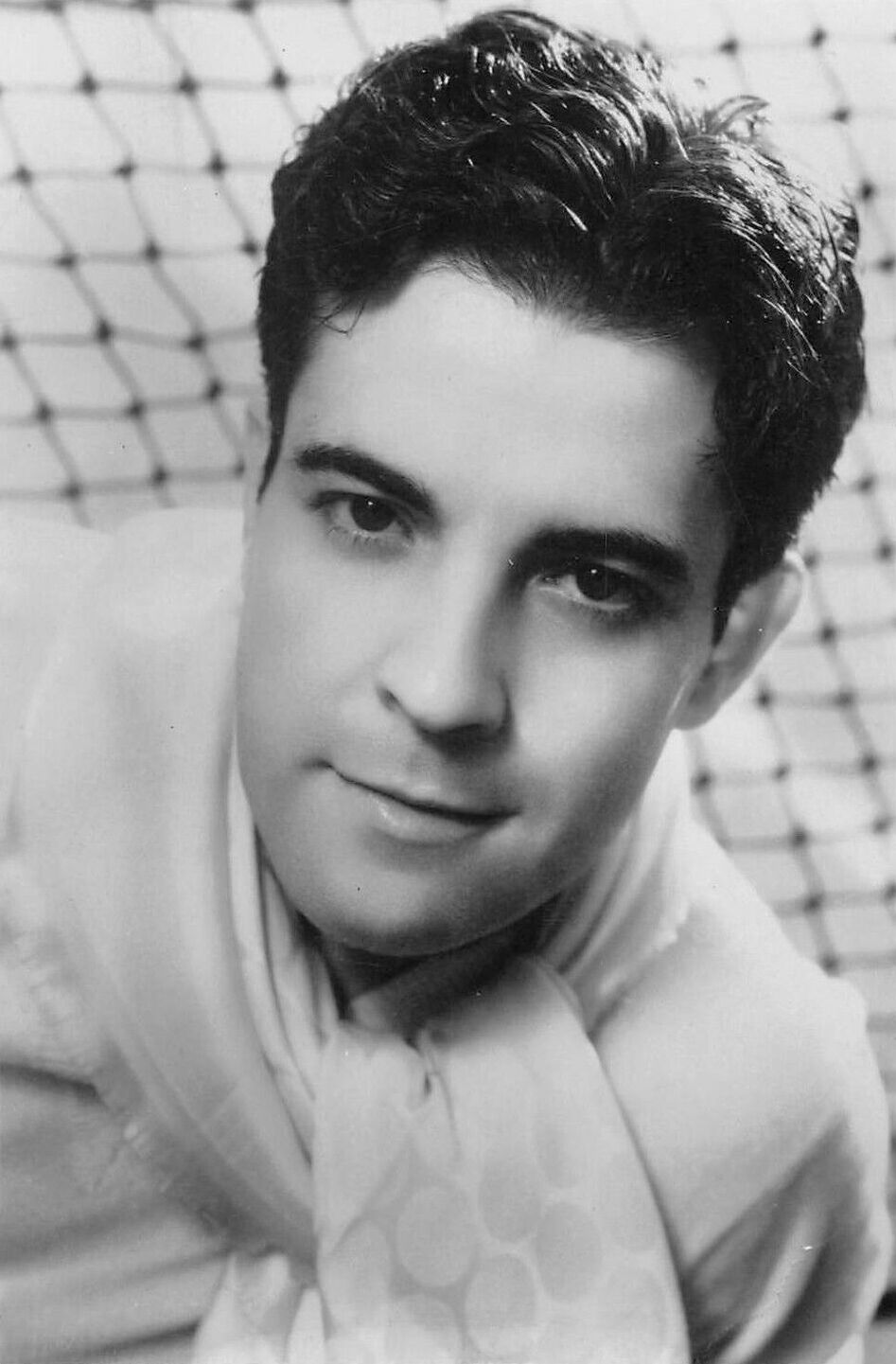
Ramon Novarro

- February 3
  - Café Filho, 18th President of Brazil (d. 1970)
  - Lao She, Chinese author (d. 1966)
  - Doris Speed, British actress (d. 1994)
  - Mildred Trotter, American forensic anthropologist (d. 1991)
- February 6 – Ramon Novarro, Mexican-born American actor (k. 1968)
- February 10 – Cevdet Sunay, 5th President of Turkey (d. 1982)
- February 15
  - Georges Auric, French composer (d. 1983)
  - Lillian Disney, American artist (d. 1997)
  - Gale Sondergaard, American actress (d. 1985)
- February 17 – Jibanananda Das, Indian poet, writer, novelist and essayist in Bengali (d. 1954)
- February 18 – Sir Arthur Bryant, British historian (d. 1985)
- February 22
  - Joseph Le Brix, French aviator, naval officer (d. 1931)
  - Ian Clunies Ross, Australian scientist (d. 1959)
- February 23 – Erich Kästner, German writer (d. 1974)
- February 24 – Mikhail Gromov, Soviet aviator (d. 1985)
- February 26 – Alec Campbell, Australian WWI soldier, last Australian Gallipoli veteran (d. 2002)
- February 27 – Charles Best, Canadian medical scientist (d. 1978)

=== March ===
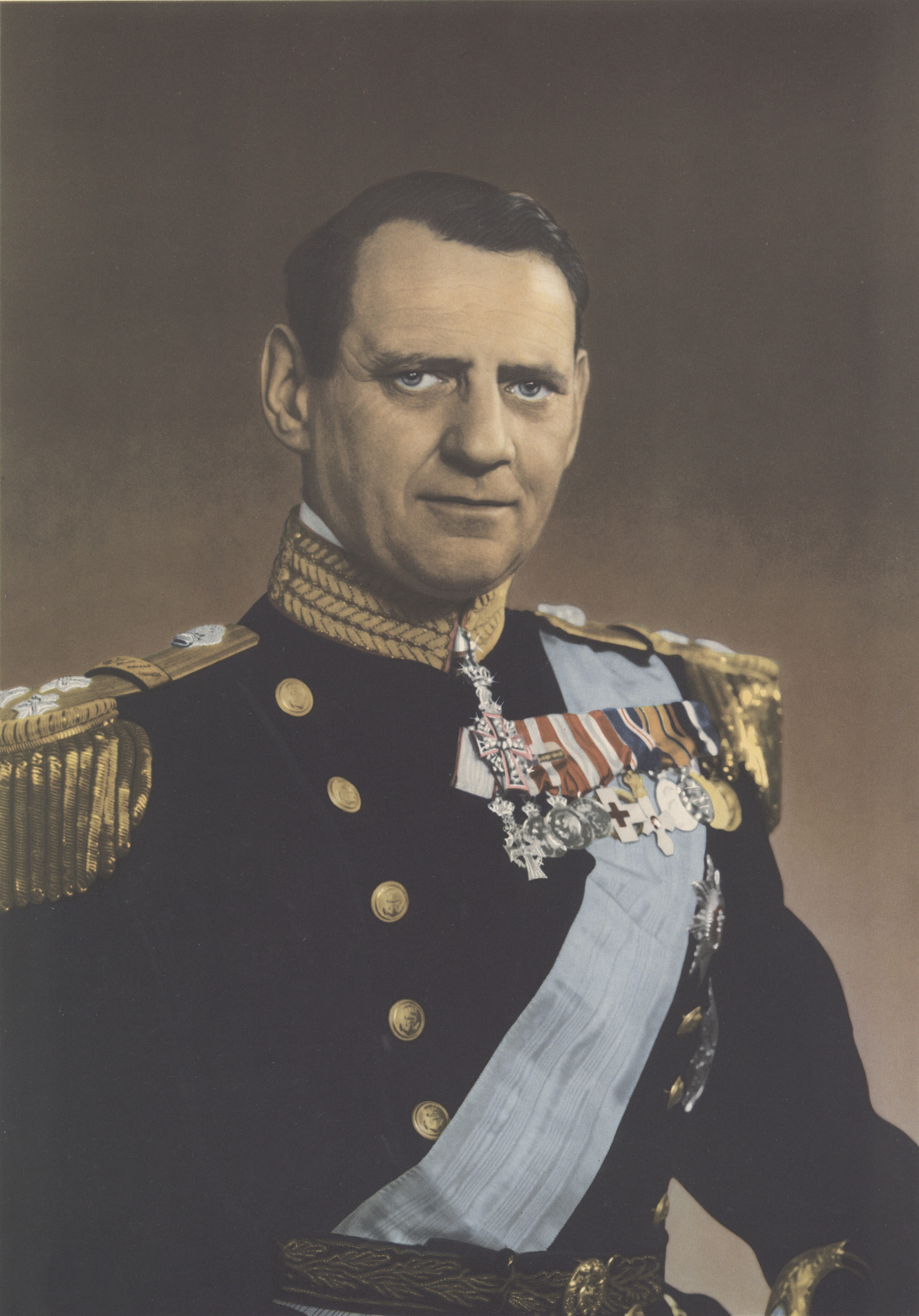
Frederik IX of Denmark

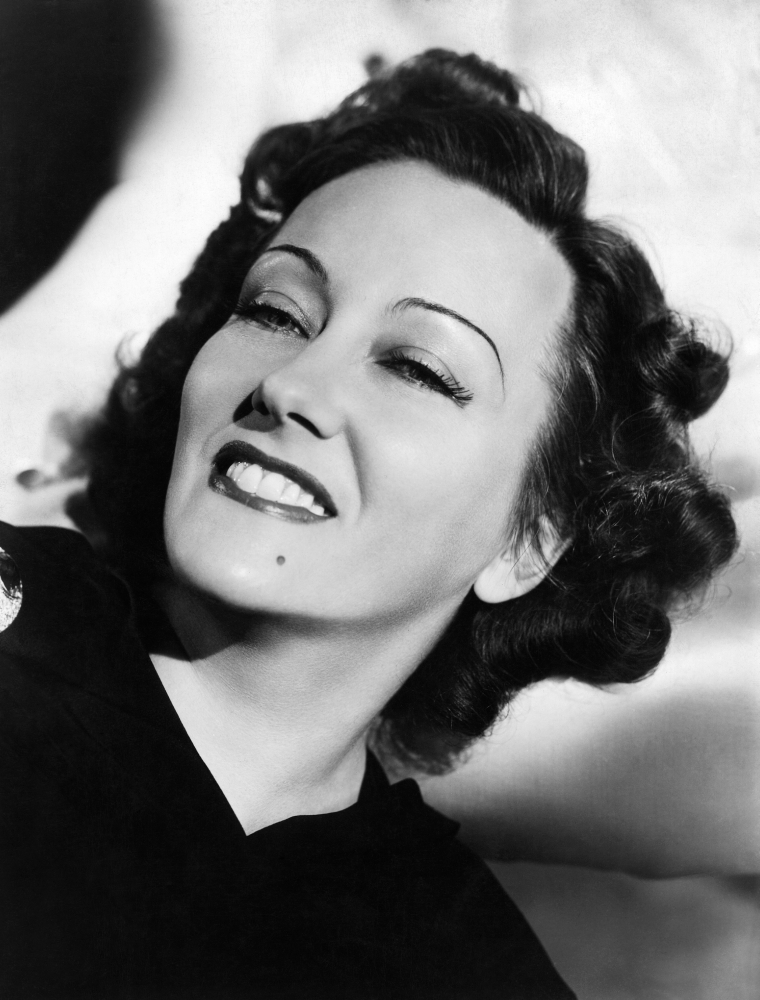
Gloria Swanson

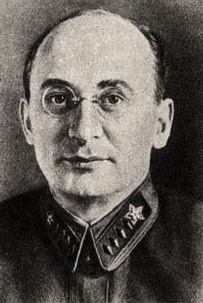
Lavrentiy Beria

- March 8
  - Eric Linklater, British author (d. 1974)
  - Elmer Keith, American rancher, author, and firearms enthusiast (d. 1984)
- March 11 – King Frederik IX of Denmark (d. 1972)
- March 13 – John Hasbrouck Van Vleck, American physicist, Nobel Prize laureate (d. 1980)
- March 21 – Panagiotis Pipinelis, Prime Minister of Greece (d. 1970)
- March 24 – Dorothy C. Stratton, American director of the SPARS during World War II (d. 2006)
- March 25 – Burt Munro, New Zealand motorcycle racer (d. 1978)
- March 27 – Gloria Swanson, American actress (d. 1983)
- March 28
  - Gussie Busch, American founder of the Anheuser-Busch Brewery Company (d. 1989)
  - Harold B. Lee, 11th president of the Church of Jesus Christ of Latter-day Saints (d. 1973)
- March 29 – Lavrentiy Beria, Soviet official (d. 1953)

=== April ===
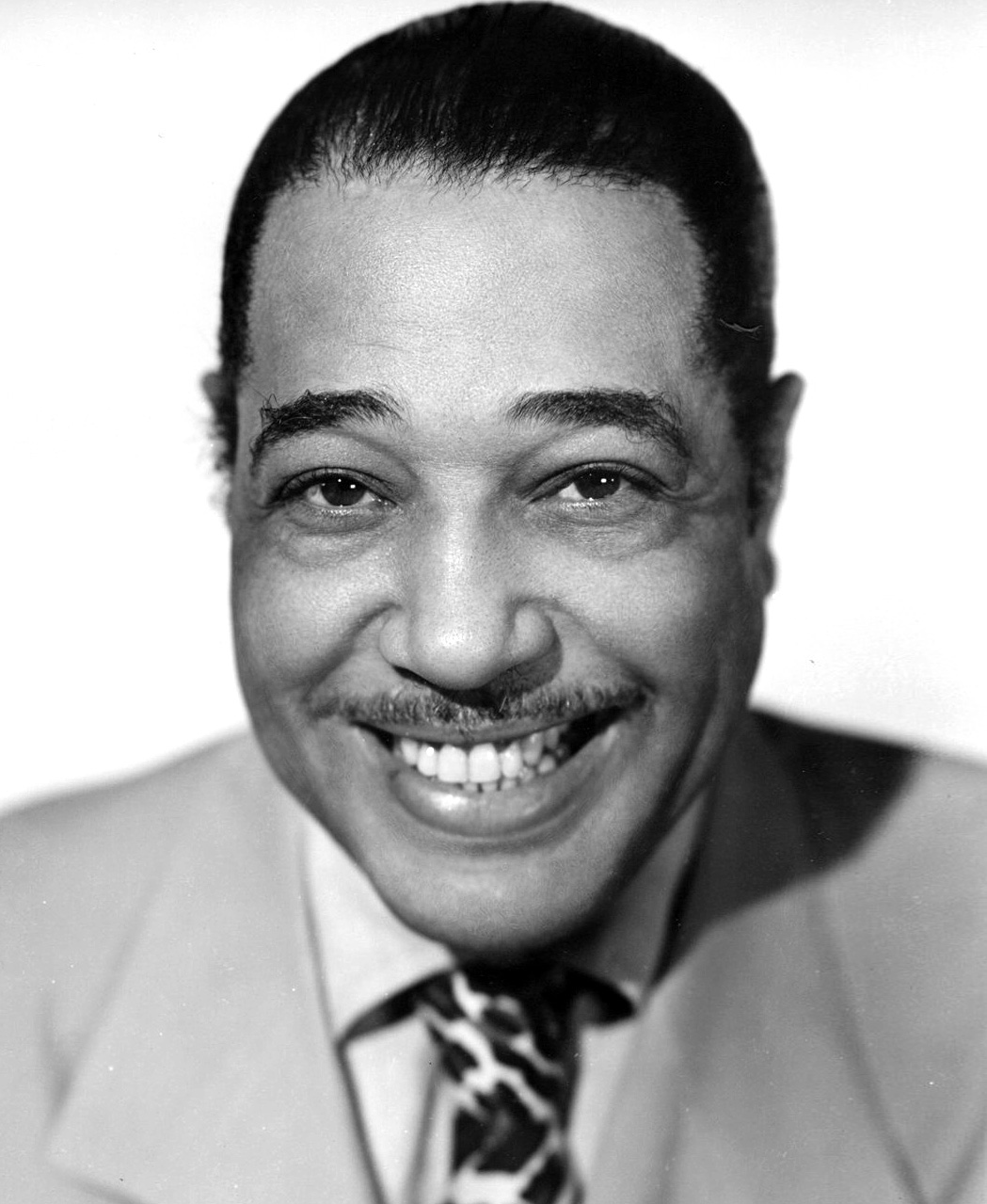
Duke Ellington

- April 7 – Robert Casadesus, French pianist (d. 1972)
- April 9 – Hans Jeschonnek, German general (d. 1943)
- April 11 – Percy Lavon Julian, American scientist (d. 1975)
- April 16 – Osman Achmatowicz, Polish chemist (d. 1988)
- April 19 – George O'Brien, American actor (d. 1985)
- April 20 – Alan Arnett McLeod, Canadian soldier, Victoria Cross recipient (d. 1918)
- April 22 – Vladimir Nabokov, Russian-born American writer (d. 1977)
- April 23 – Bertil Ohlin, Swedish economist, Nobel Prize laureate (d. 1979)
- April 24 – Oscar Zariski, Russian mathematician (d. 1986)
- April 27 – Walter Lantz, American animator, creator of Woody Woodpecker (d. 1994)
- April 29 – Duke Ellington, African-American jazz musician, bandleader (d. 1974)

=== May ===
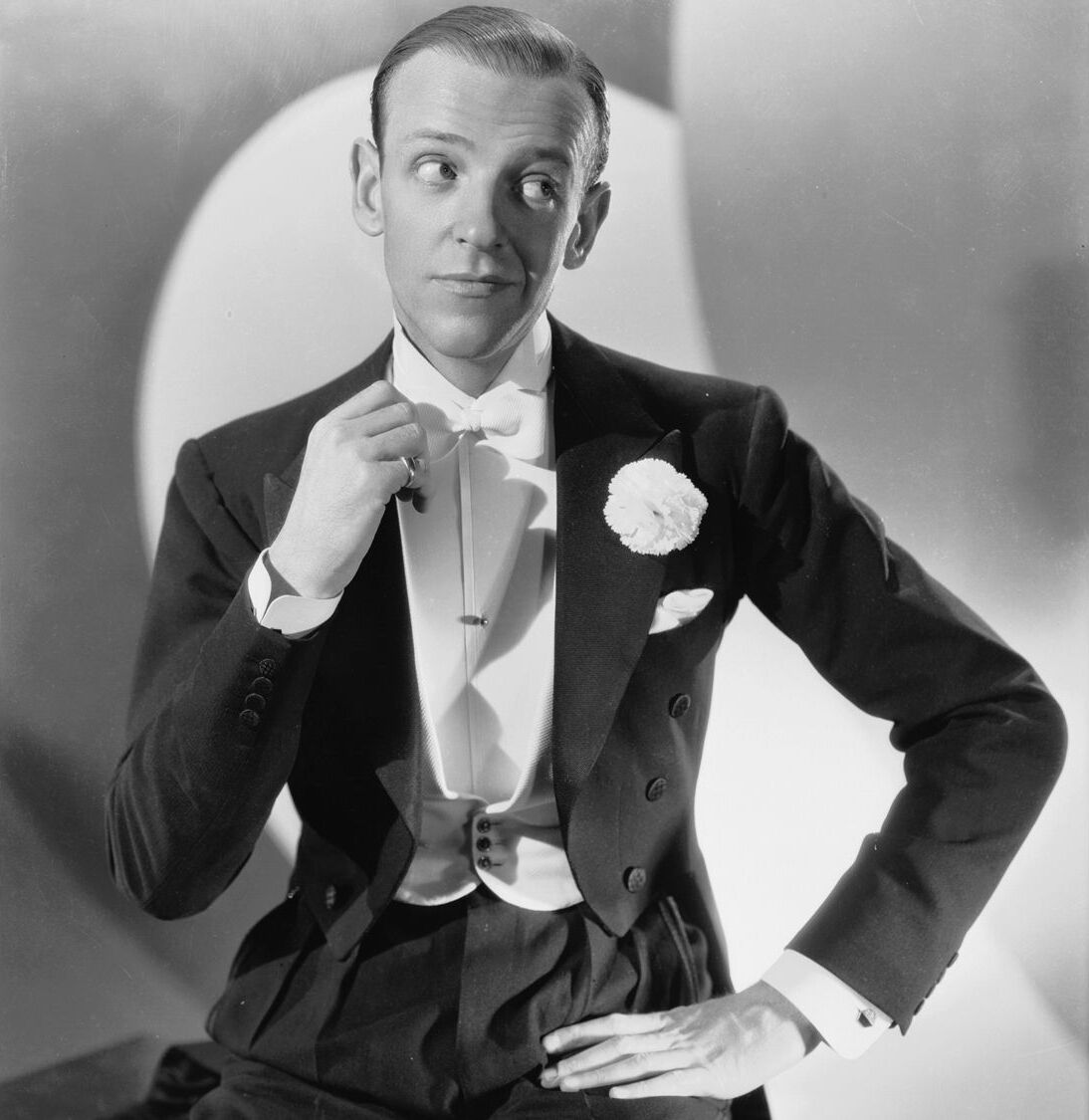
Fred Astaire

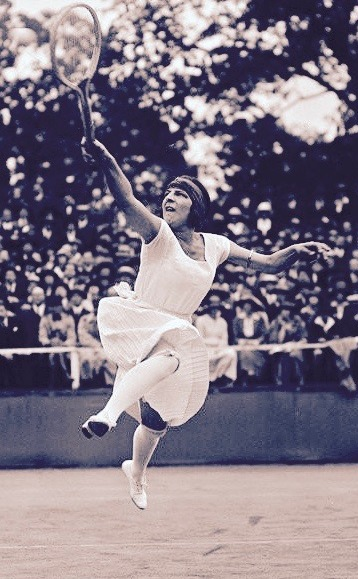
Suzanne Lenglen

- May 3 – Aline MacMahon, American actress (d. 1991)
- May 8 – Friedrich Hayek, Austrian economist, Nobel Prize laureate (d. 1992)
- May 10 – Fred Astaire, American singer, dancer and actor (d. 1987)
- May 12 – Indra Devi, Baltic-born yogi and actress (d. 2002)
- May 17 – Anita Conti, French-Armenian explorer, photographer, first female oceanographer in France (d. 1997)
- May 20 – John Marshall Harlan II, Associate Justice of the Supreme Court of the United States (d. 1971)
- May 24
  - Suzanne Lenglen, French tennis player (d. 1938)
  - Kazi Nazrul Islam, Bangladeshi national poet (d. 1976)
- May 30 – Irving Thalberg, American film producer (d. 1936)

=== June ===
- June 2 – Lotte Reiniger, German-born silhouette animator (d. 1981)
- June 3 – Georg von Békésy, Hungarian biophysicist, recipient of the Nobel Prize in Physiology or Medicine (d. 1972)
- June 10 – Ruth Poll, American lyricist and music publisher (d. 1955)
- June 11 – Yasunari Kawabata, Japanese writer, recipient of the Nobel Prize in Literature (d. 1972)
- June 12 – Fritz Albert Lipmann, German-born American biochemist, recipient of the Nobel Prize in Physiology or Medicine (d. 1986)
- June 13 – Carlos Chávez, Mexican composer (d. 1978)
- June 16 – Helen Traubel, American soprano (d. 1972)
- June 24 – Bruce Marshall, Scottish writer (d. 1987)
- June 25 – Arthur Tracy, American singer (d. 1997)
- June 26 – Grand Duchess Maria Nikolaevna of Russia (d. 1918)
- June 27 – Juan Trippe, American airline pioneer, entrepreneur (d. 1981)
- June 30
  - Madge Bellamy, American actress (d. 1990)
  - František Tomášek, Czechoslovak cardinal and archbishop (d. 1992)

=== July ===
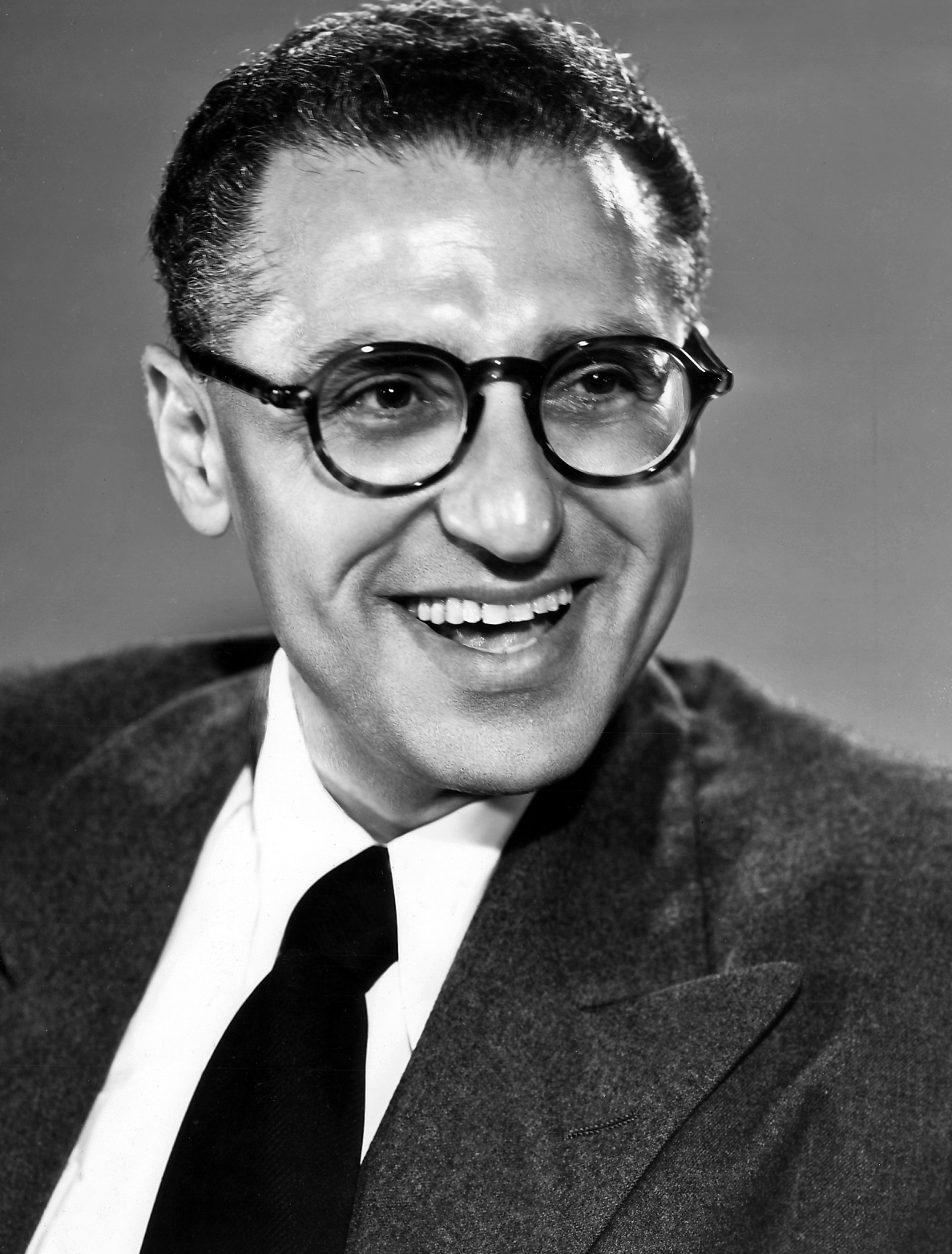
George Cukor

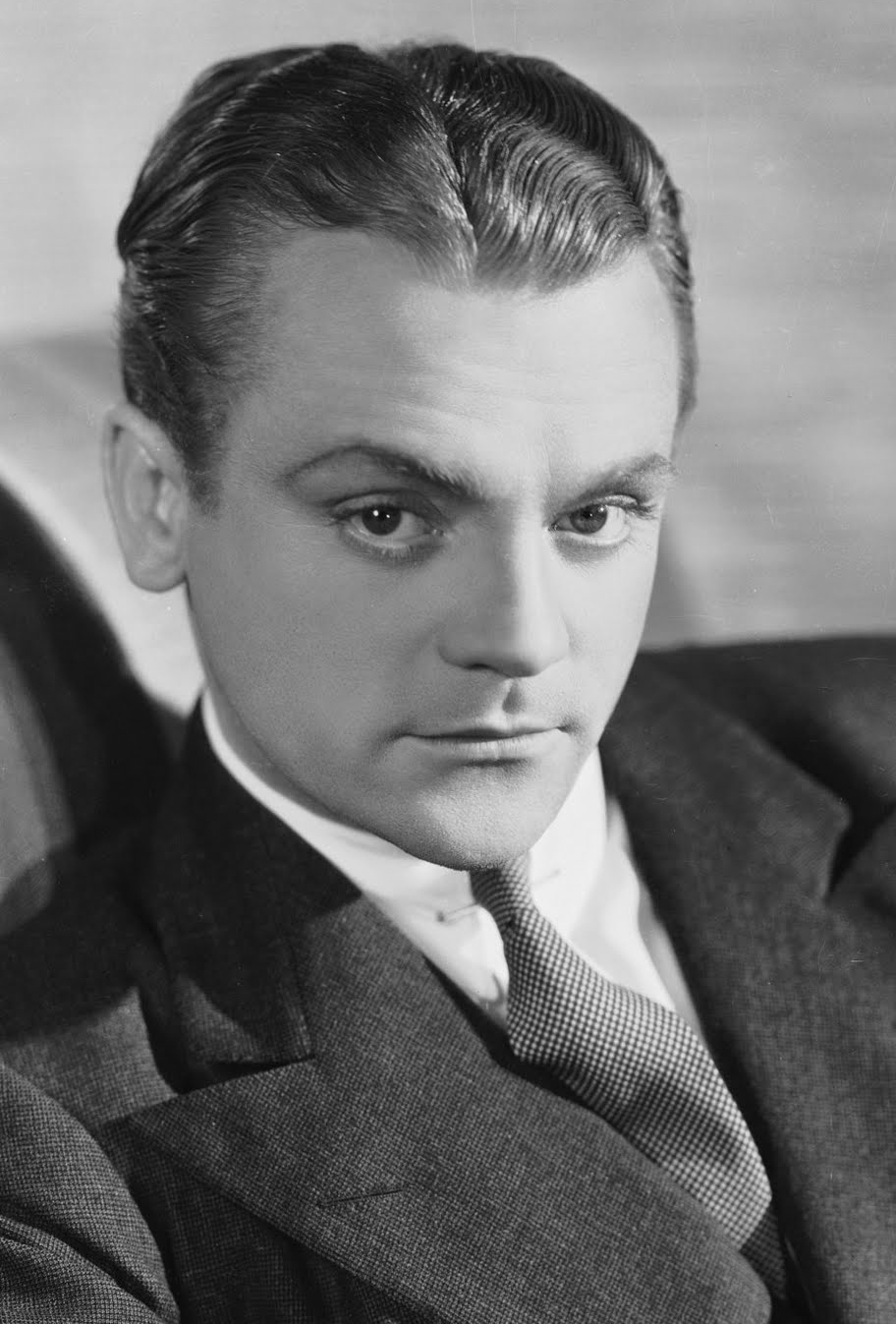
James Cagney

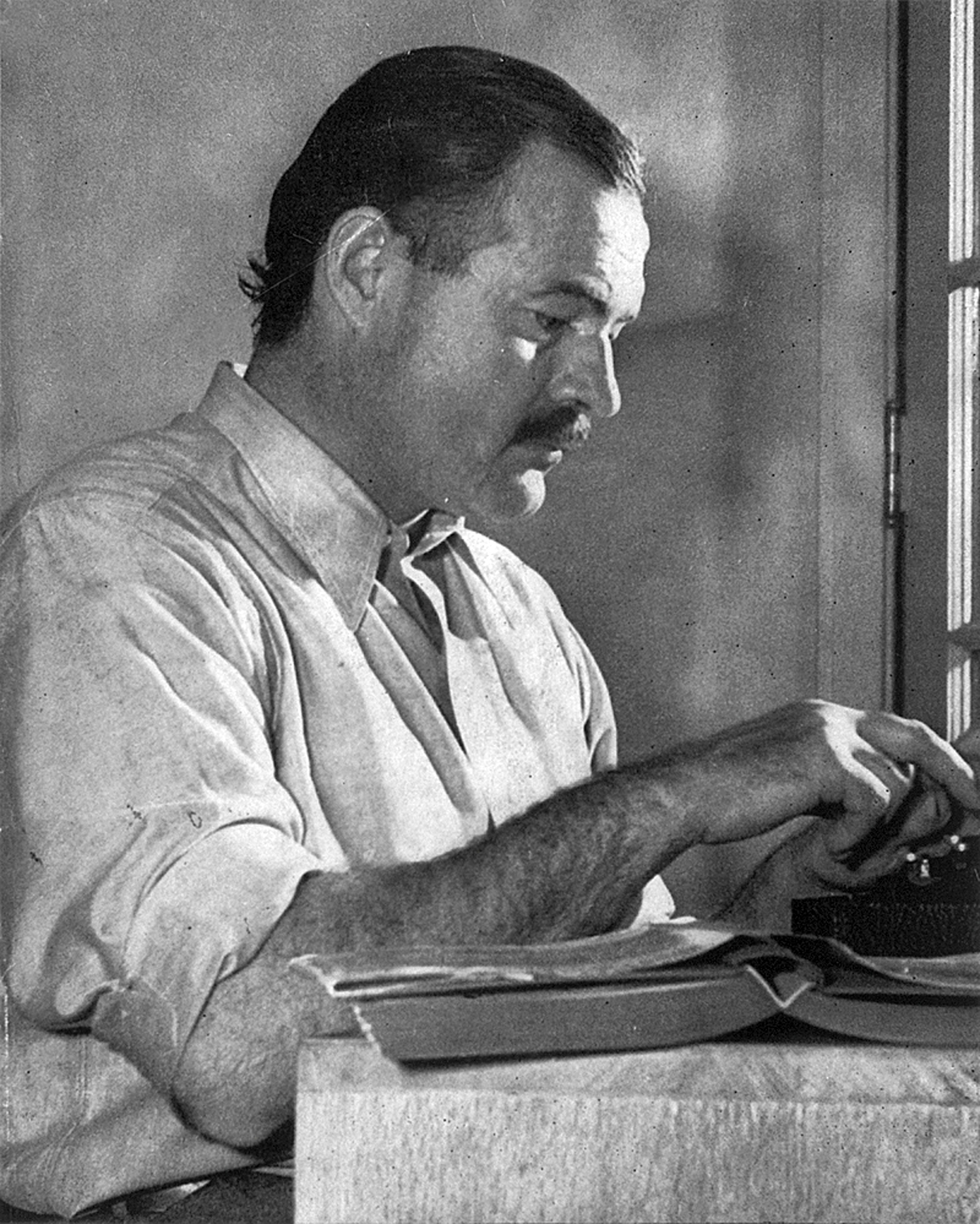
Ernest Hemingway

- July 1
  - Thomas A. Dorsey, American musician (d. 1993)
  - Charles Laughton, English-American stage, film actor (d. 1962)
  - Konstantinos Tsatsos, President of Greece (d. 1987)
- July 4 – Austin Warren, American literary critic. (d. 1986)
- July 5 – Marcel Achard, French playwright, scriptwriter (d. 1974)
- July 6 – Susannah Mushatt Jones, American supercentenarian, last remaining American born in the 19th century and world's oldest living person (d. 2016)
- July 7
  - George Cukor, American film director (d. 1983)
  - Jesse Wallace, American naval officer, 29th Governor of American Samoa (d. 1961)
- July 11 – E. B. White, American writer (d. 1985)
- July 12 – E. D. Nixon, African-American civil rights leader and union organizer (d. 1987)
- July 15 – Seán Lemass, Taoiseach of Ireland (d. 1971)
- July 16 – Božidar Jakac, Slovene painter, photographer and filmmaker. (d. 1989)
- July 17 – James Cagney, American actor and dancer (d. 1986)
- July 21
  - Hart Crane, American poet (suicide 1932)
  - Ernest Hemingway, American author, journalist (suicide 1961)
- July 22 – King Sobhuza II of Swaziland (d. 1982)
- July 23 – Gustav Heinemann, President of West Germany (d. 1976)
- July 24 – Chief Dan George, Canadian actor, writer and tribal chief of the Tsleil-Waututh First Nation (d. 1981)
- July 29 – Alice Terry, American film actress (d. 1987)

=== August ===
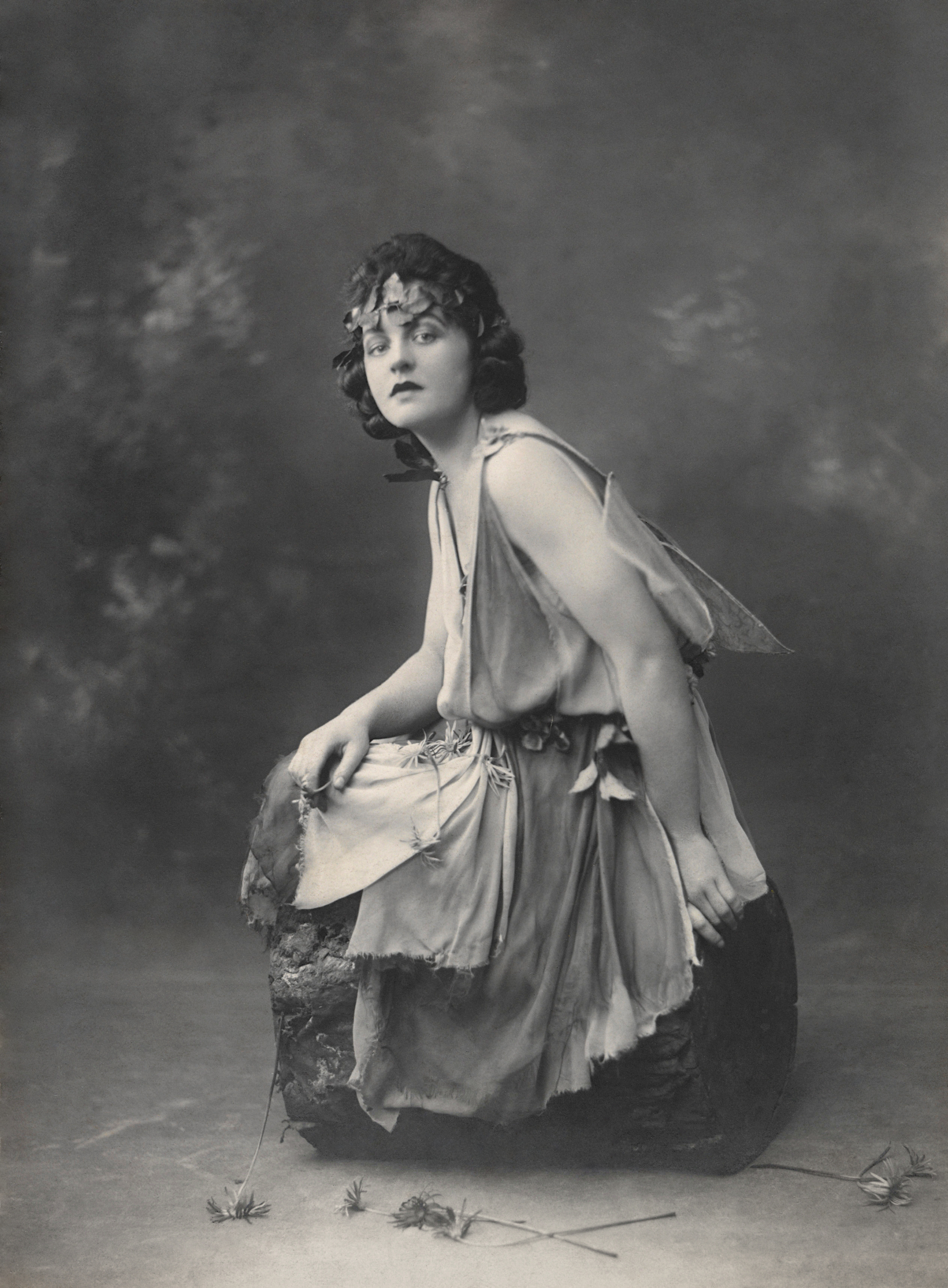
P. L. Travers

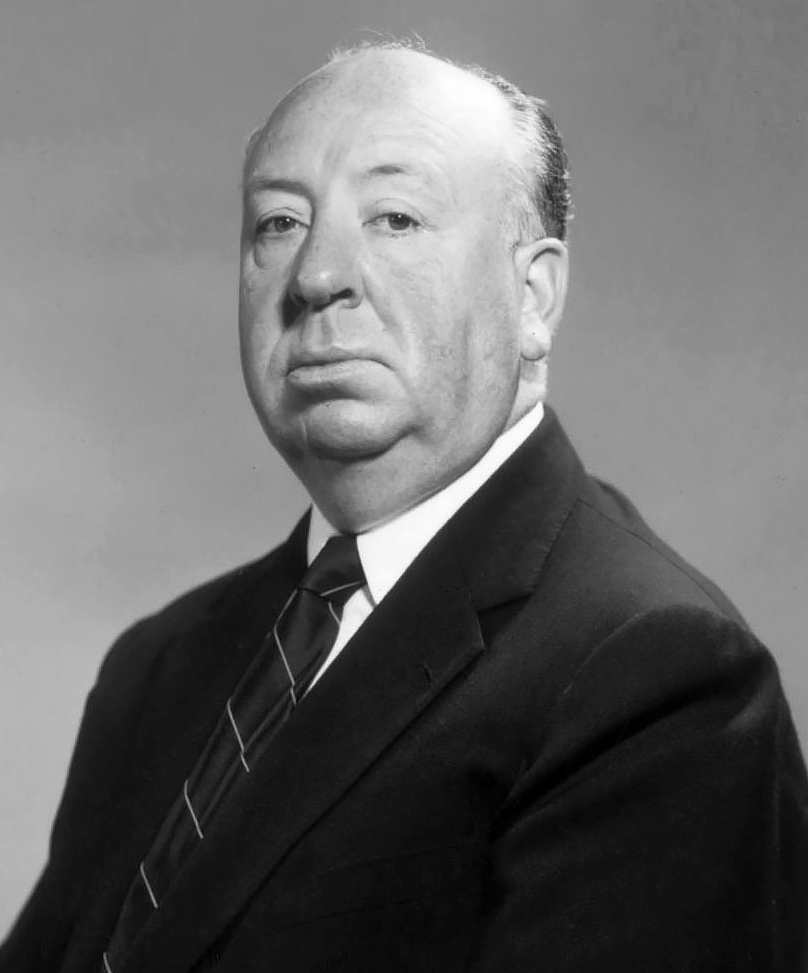
Sir Alfred Hitchcock

- August 4 – Ezra Taft Benson, American religious leader, president of the Church of Jesus Christ of Latter-day Saints (d. 1994)
- August 9
  - Paul Kelly, American stage, film actor (d. 1956)
  - P. L. Travers, Australian-born British author (Mary Poppins) (d. 1996)
- August 13 – Alfred Hitchcock, British-born American film director (d. 1980)
- August 14 – Alma Reville, English screenwriter, wife of Alfred Hitchcock (d. 1982)
- August 16 – Glenn Strange, American actor (d. 1973)
- August 19 – Colleen Moore, American actress (d. 1988)
- August 24
  - Jorge Luis Borges, Argentine writer (d. 1986)
  - Albert Claude, Belgian biologist, recipient of the Nobel Prize in Physiology or Medicine (d. 1983)
- August 26 – Rufino Tamayo, Mexican painter (d. 1991)
- August 27
  - C. S. Forester, English novelist (d. 1966)
  - Byron Foulger, American actor (d. 1970)
- August 28 – Charles Boyer, French actor (d. 1978)
- August 29 – Lyman Lemnitzer, American general (d. 1988)
- August 31 – Boots Adams, American business magnate, president of Phillips Petroleum Company (d. 1975)

=== September ===
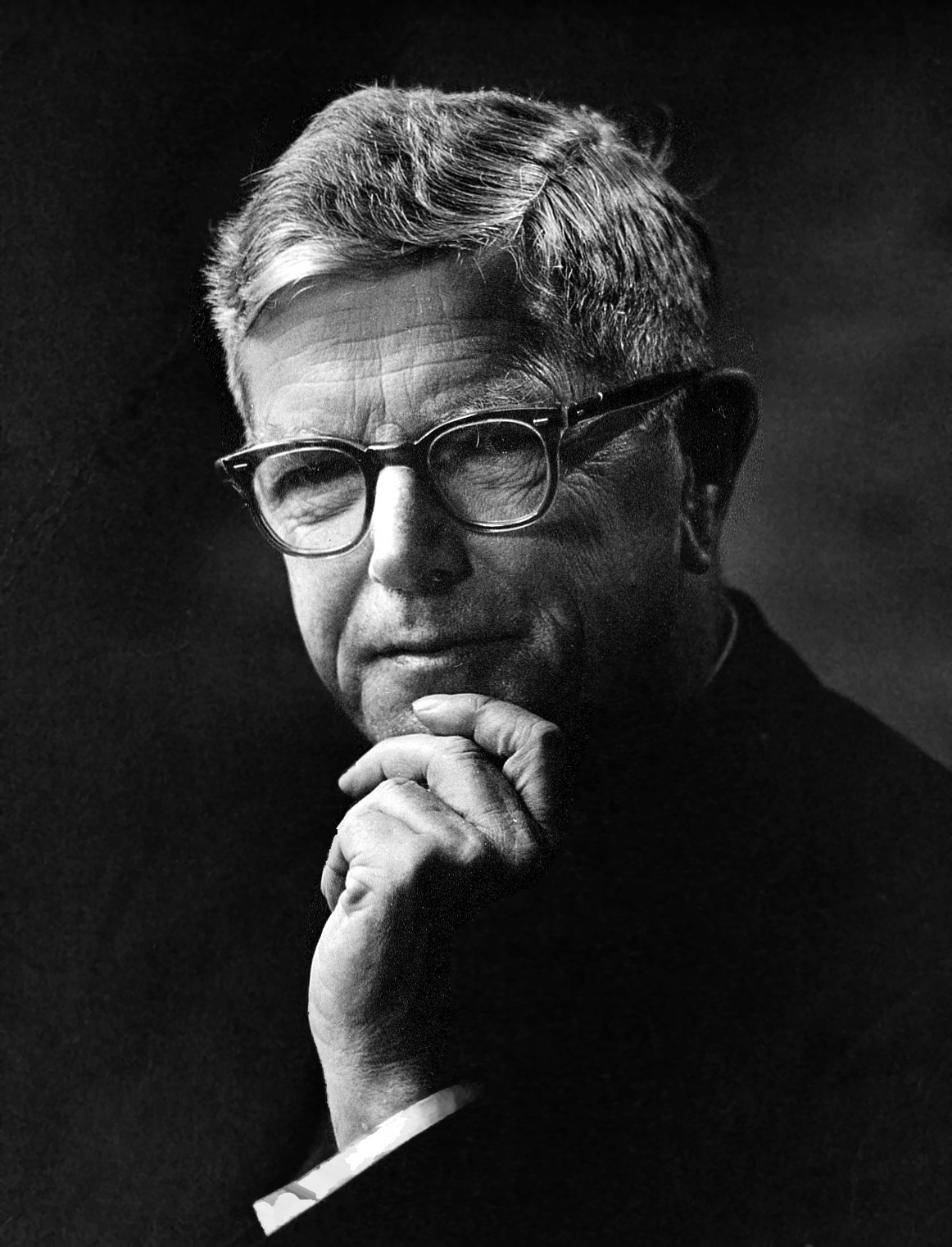
Sir Macfarlane Burnet

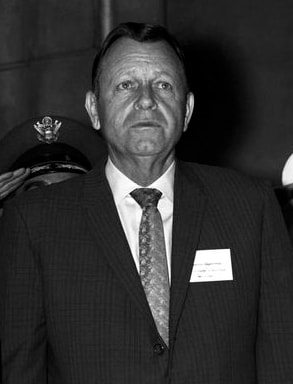
Jimmie Davis

- September 1 – Andrei Platonov, Russian-born Soviet writer (d. 1951)
- September 3 – Macfarlane Burnet, Australian biologist, recipient of the Nobel Prize in Physiology or Medicine (d. 1985)
- September 8 – May McAvoy, American actress and singer (d. 1984)
- September 9 – Brassaï, French photographer (d. 1984)
- September 11 – Jimmie Davis, American politician and musician, Governor of Louisiana (d. 2000)
- September 13 – Corneliu Zelea Codreanu, Romanian fascist politician, leader of the Iron Guard (d. 1938)
- September 18 – Ida Kamińska, Polish actress, playwright and translator (d. 1980)
- September 23
  - Tom C. Clark, Associate Justice of the Supreme Court of the United States (d. 1977)
  - Louise Nevelson, Ukrainian-born American sculptor (d. 1988)
- September 24 – Bessie Braddock, British politician (d. 1970)

=== October ===
- October 1 – Ernest Haycox, American writer (d. 1950)
- October 3 – Gertrude Berg, American actress (d. 1966)
- October 4 – Franz Jonas, President of Austria (d. 1974)
- October 5 – George, Duke of Mecklenburg, head of the House of Mecklenburg-Strelitz (d. 1963)
- October 8 – Al Sheehan, American entertainment businessman and radio host (d. 1967)
- October 9 – Bruce Catton, American Civil War historian, Pulitzer Prize winner (d. 1978)
- October 19 – Miguel Ángel Asturias, Guatemalan writer, Nobel Prize laureate (d. 1974)
- October 24 – László Bíró, Hungarian inventor of the ballpoint pen (d. 1985)
- October 29 – Akim Tamiroff, Armenian actor (d. 1972)

=== November ===
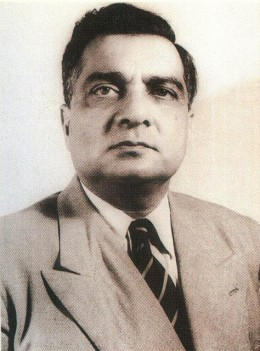
Iskander Mirza

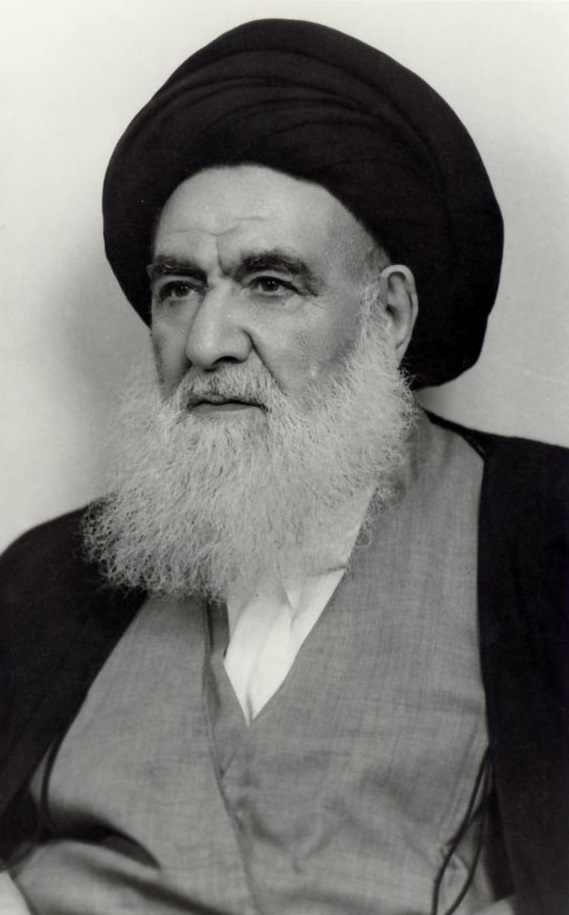
Abu al-Qasim al-Khoei

- November 7 – Stanisław Swianiewicz, Polish economist and historian (d. 1997)
- November 11 – Pat O'Brien, American actor (d. 1983)
- November 13
  - Vera Caspary, American screenwriter, novelist, playwright (d. 1987)
  - Iskandar Ali Mirza, 1st president of Pakistan (d. 1969)
- November 17 – Douglas Shearer, Canadian-born American film sound engineer (d. 1971)
- November 18 – Eugene Ormandy, Hungarian-American conductor (d. 1985)
- November 19 – Abu al-Qasim al-Khoei, Shia Ayatollah (d. 1992)
- November 22 – Hoagy Carmichael, American composer, pianist, singer, actor and bandleader (d. 1981)
- November 24 – Soraya Tarzi, Afghan feminist, queen (d. 1968)
- November 26
  - Richard Hauptmann, German murderer of Charles Lindbergh Jr. (d. 1936)
  - Maurice Rose, American general (d. 1945)
- November 29 – Emma Morano, Italian supercentenarian, oldest Italian ever, last surviving person born in the 1800s (d. 2017)

=== December ===
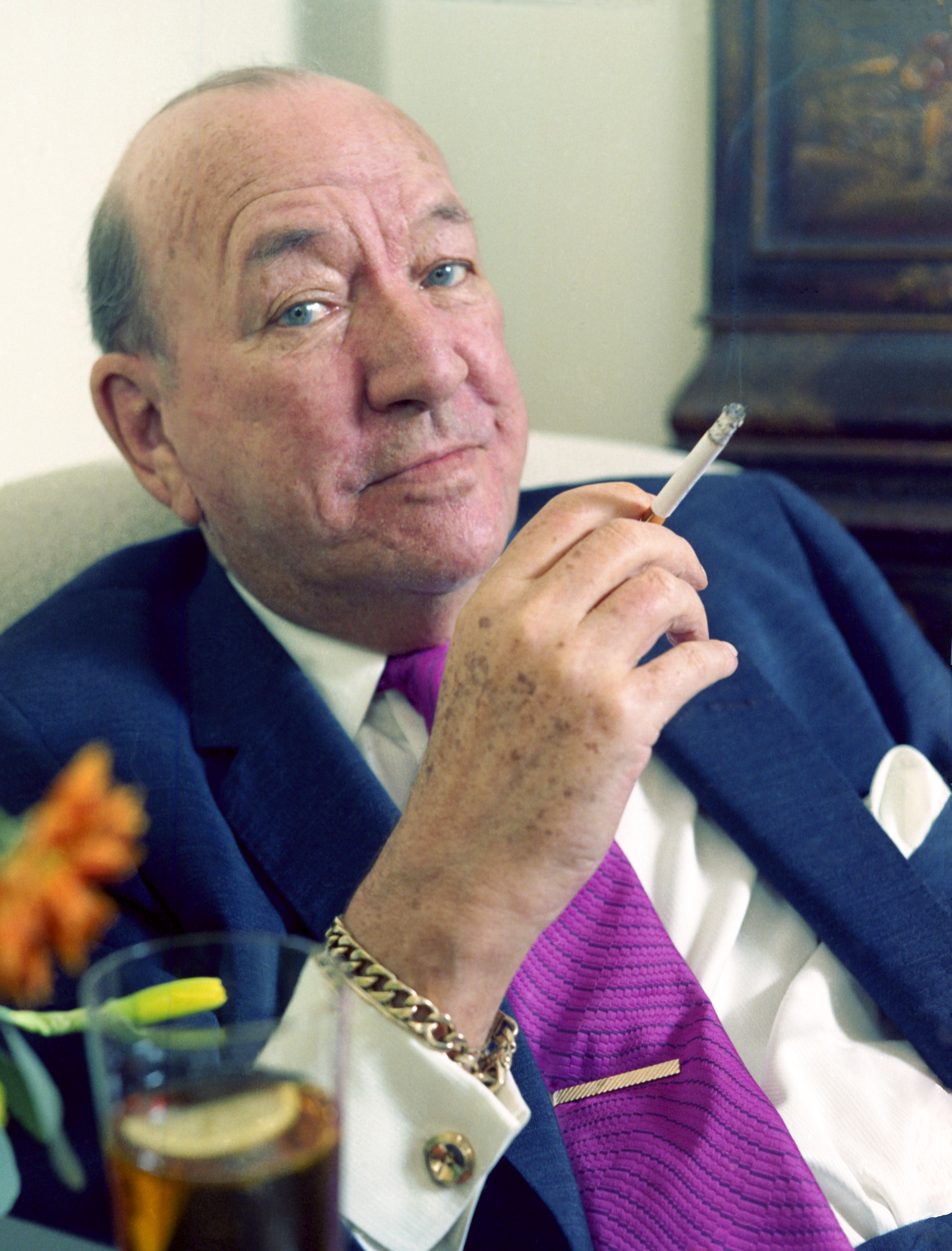
Sir Noël Coward

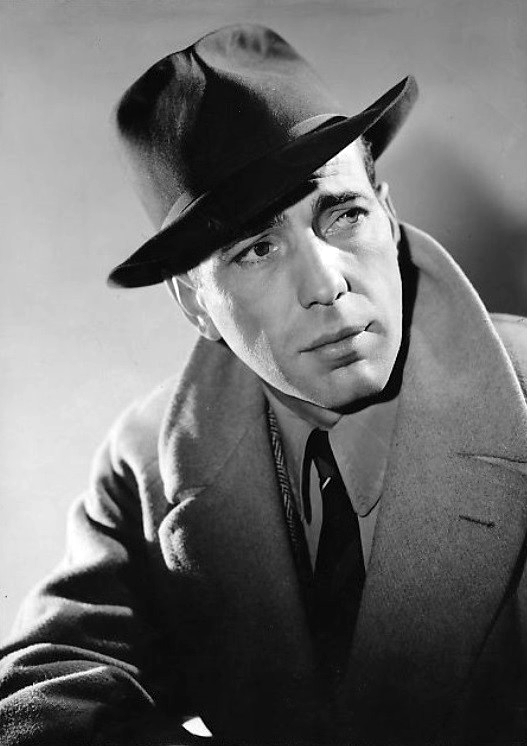
Humphrey Bogart

- December 1 – Tommy Lucchese, American gangster (d. 1967)
- December 2 – John Barbirolli, English conductor (d. 1970)
- December 3 – Hayato Ikeda, prime minister of Japan (d. 1965)
- December 8 – John Qualen, Canadian-American actor (d. 1987)
- December 9 – Jean de Brunhoff, French writer (d. 1937)
- December 14 – DeFord Bailey, American country musician (d. 1982)
- December 15 – Harold Abrahams, British athlete (d. 1978)
- December 16
  - Noël Coward, English actor, playwright and composer (d. 1973)
  - Aleksander Zawadzki, President of Poland (d. 1964)
- December 18 – Peter Wessel Zapffe, Norwegian author and philosopher (d. 1990)
- December 19 – Martin Luther King Sr., American Baptist pastor, missionary, and figure in the civil rights movement (d. 1984)
- December 20 – John Sparkman, American politician (d. 1985)
- December 25
  - Humphrey Bogart, American actor (d. 1957)
  - Oscar Polk, American actor (d. 1949)
  - Frank Ferguson, American actor (d. 1978)
- December 28 – Eugeniusz Bodo, Polish actor (d. 1943)
- December 29 – Nie Rongzhen, Chinese Communist military leader (d. 1992)

=== Date unknown ===
- Nureddine Rifai, 25th Prime Minister of Lebanon (d. 1980)

== Deaths ==
=== January–February ===
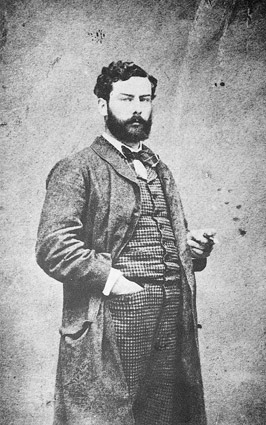
Alfred Sisley

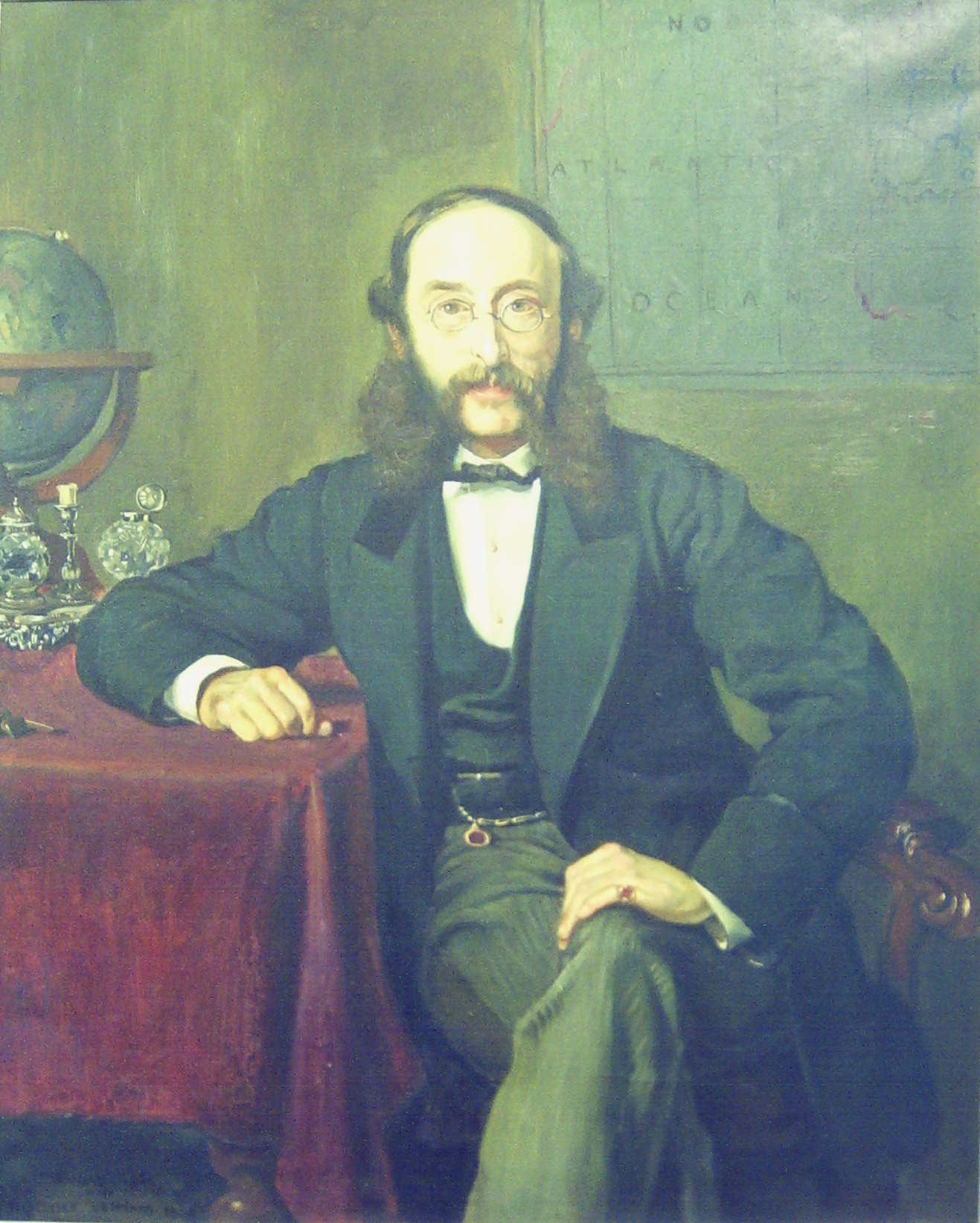
Paul Reuter

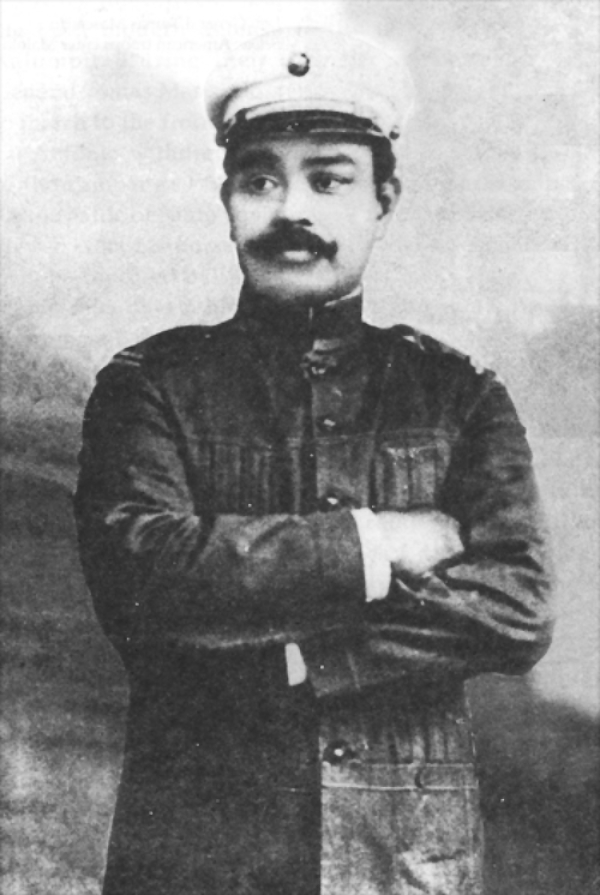
Antonio Luna

- January 1 – William Hugh Smith, 72, Governor of Alabama during Reconstruction, 1868 to 1870, former Alabama legislator who joined the Union Army
- January 10
  - Jonathan B. Turner, 93, U.S. educational reformer and champion of land grant universities, co-founder of the University of Illinois
  - William A. Russell, 67, U.S. Congressman and industrialist who was the first president of the International Paper Company
- January 13 – Nelson Dingley Jr., 66, U.S. politician and Congressman for Maine since 1881, author of the Dingley Act for increased tariffs
- January 14 – Nubar Pasha, 74, the first Prime Minister of Egypt (1878–79, 1884–88 and 1894–95)
- January 17 – Jedediah Hotchkiss, 70, American military cartographer for the Confederacy during the American Civil War
- January 23 – Romualdo Pacheco, 77, the only Hispanic Governor of the U.S. state of California (in 1875); (b. 1831)
- January 29 – Alfred Sisley, 59, French impressionist landscape painter, died of throat cancer (b. 1839)
- January 30 –Harry Bates, 48, British sculptor (b. 1850)
- January 31 – Princess Marie Louise of Bourbon-Parma, 29, princess consort of Bulgaria, from complications of childbirth (b. 1870)
- February 6
  - Leo von Caprivi, Chancellor of Germany (b. 1831)
  - Alfred, Hereditary Prince of Saxe-Coburg and Gotha (b. 1874)
- February 11 – Teuku Umar, Leader of Acehnese Rebellion (b. 1854)
- February 16 – Félix Faure, President of France (b. 1841)
- February 18 – Sophus Lie, Norwegian mathematician; see Lie group.(b. 1842)
- February 23 – Gaëtan de Rochebouët, Prime Minister of France (b. 1813)
- February 25 – Paul Reuter, German-born news agency founder (b. 1816)

=== March–April ===
- March 3 – William P. Sprague, American politician from Ohio (b. 1827)
- March 6 – Princess Kaʻiulani, last monarch of Hawaii (b. 1875)
- March 12 – Sir Julius Vogel, Premier of New Zealand (b. 1835)
- March 18 – Othniel Charles Marsh, American palaeontologist (b. 1831)
- March 20 – Martha M. Place, American murderer, first woman executed in the electric chair (b. 1849)
- March 24 – Marie Goegg-Pouchoulin, Swiss national, international women's rights activist, pacifist (b. 1826)
- April 1 – Charles C. Carpenter, American admiral (b. 1834)
- April 5 – T. E. Ellis, Welsh politician (b. 1859)
- April 6 – Garret Parry, Irish piper (b. 1847)
- April 7 – Pieter Rijke, Dutch physicist (b. 1812)
- April 11 – Lascăr Catargiu, 4-time prime minister of Romania (b. 1823)
- April 16 – Emilio Jacinto, Filipino poet, revolutionary (b. 1875)
- April 22
  - Sir John Mowbray, 1st Baronet, British MP and Father of the House of Commons since 1898 (b. 1815)
  - Johann Köler, Estonian painter (b. 1826)
- April 24 – Richard J. Oglesby, U.S. politician, three-time Governor of Illinois for whom the town of Oglesby, Illinois is named (b. 1824)
- April 26 – Count Karl Sigmund von Hohenwart, Minister-President of Austria, 1871 (b. 1824)
- April 30 – Lewis Baker, U.S. politician and diplomat (b. 1832)

=== May–June ===
- May 16 – William Nast, German-born religious leader and founder of the German Methodist Church in the U.S. (b. 1807)
- May 19 – Charles R. Buckalew, American politician and diplomat (b. 1821)
- May 22 – John Bachmann, Swiss-American lithographer (b. 1817)
- May 24 – William Brett, 1st Viscount Esher, British law lord (b. 1817)
- May 25 – Emilio Castelar y Ripoll, President of the First Spanish Republic (b. 1832)
- June 3 – Johann Strauss Jr., Austrian composer (b. 1825)
- June 4 – Eugenio Beltrami, Italian mathematician (b. 1835)
- June 5 – Antonio Luna, Filipino general (assassinated) (b. 1866)
- June 7 – Augustin Daly, American theatrical impresario, playwright (b. 1838)
- June 10 – Ernest Chausson, French composer (b. 1855)

=== July–August ===
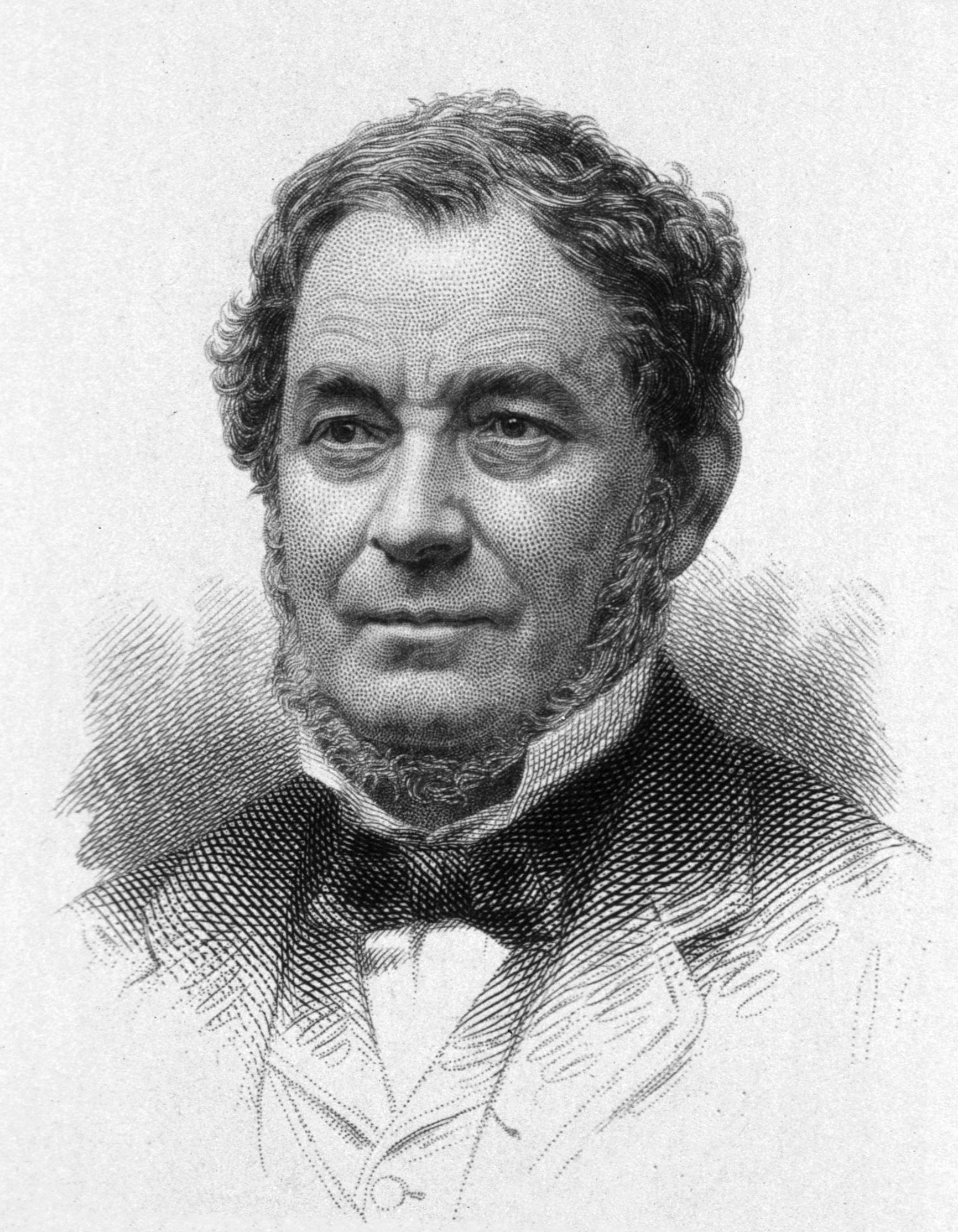
Robert Bunsen

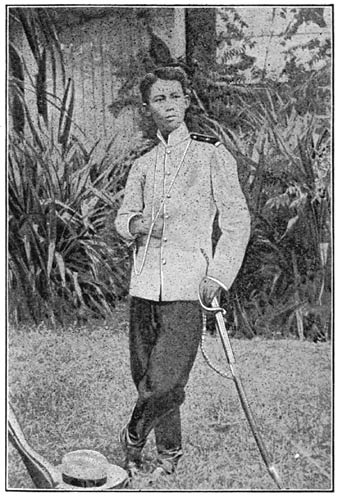
Gregorio del Pilar

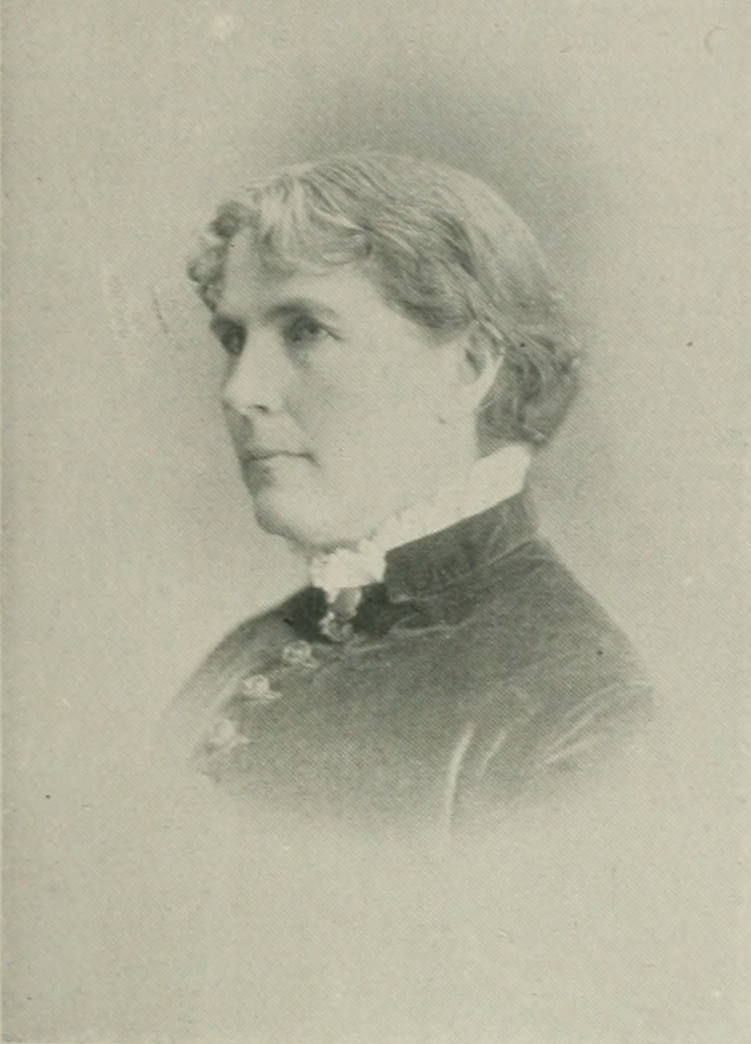
Frances Laughton Mace

- July 1 – Sir William Flower, British museum curator and surgeon (b. 1831)
- July 2 – General Horatio Wright, 79, American engineer, U.S. Army officer in the American Civil War, Chief of Engineers for the U.S. Army Corps of Engineers (b. 1820)
- July 4 – Sir Alexander Armstrong, 81, Irish-born physician, Royal Navy officer and Arctic explorer (b. 1818)
- July 10
  - Grand Duke George Alexandrovich of Russia, 28, Tsarevich and heir to the throne of Russia as younger brother of Nicholas II (b. 1871)
  - Albert Grévy, French statesman and Governor-General of Algeria 1879-1881 (b. 1823)
- July 16
  - Margaretta Riley, British botanist (b. 1804)
  - William Preston Johnston, 68, American college administrator and first president of Tulane University (b. 1831)
- July 18 – Horatio Alger Jr., American writer (b. 1832)
- July 20 – Frances Laughton Mace, American poet (b. 1836)
- July 21 – Robert G. Ingersoll, American politician (b. 1833)
- July 27 – Tassilo von Heydebrand und der Lasa, German chess-master (b. 1818)
- August 4 – Karl, Freiherr von Prel, German philosopher (b. 1839)
- August 9
  - Sir Edward Frankland, British chemist (b. 1825)
  - Grand Duke George Alexandrovich of Russia, Russian Grand Duke, younger brother of Nicholas II of Russia (b. 1871)
- August 16 – Robert Bunsen, German chemist (b. 1811)

=== September–October ===
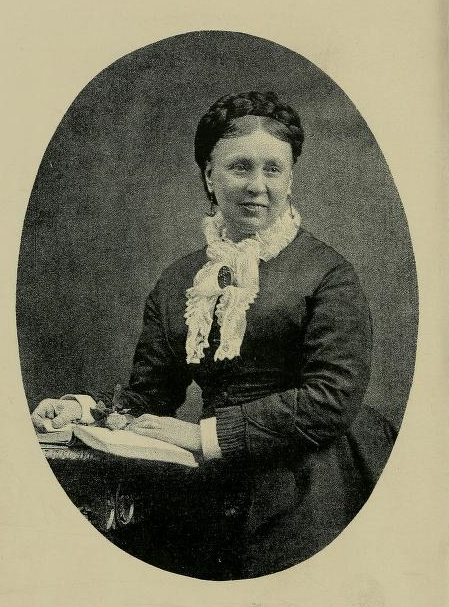
Emma Hardinge Britten

- September 2 – Ernest Renshaw, British tennis player (b. 1861)
- September 12 – Cornelius Vanderbilt II, American railway magnate (b. 1843)
- September 13 – Sarah Warren Keeler, American educator of the deaf-mute (b. 1844)
- September 17 – Charles Alfred Pillsbury, American industrialist (b. 1842)
- September 28 – Giovanni Segantini, Italian painter (b. 1858)
- October 2
  - Emma Hardinge Britten, British writer (b. 1823)
  - Percy Pilcher, British aviation pioneer, glider pilot (b. 1866)
- October 7 – Deodato Arellano, Filipino Propagandist (b. 1844)
- October 14
  - Anna Cabot Lowell Quincy Waterston, American diarist (b. 1812)
  - Nicolai Hanson, Norwegian zoologist and Antarctic explorer (b. 1870)
- October 22 – Ella Hoag Brockway Avann, American educator (b. 1853)
- October 23 – Sir Penn Symons, British general (died of wounds) (b. 1843)
- October 25 – Grant Allen, Canadian science writer and novelist (b. 1848)
- October 30
  - Sir Arthur Blomfield, British architect (b. 1829)
  - William Henry Webb, American industrialist, philanthropist (b. 1816)
- October 31 – Anton Berindei, Wallachian-born Romanian general and politician (b. 1838)

=== November–December ===
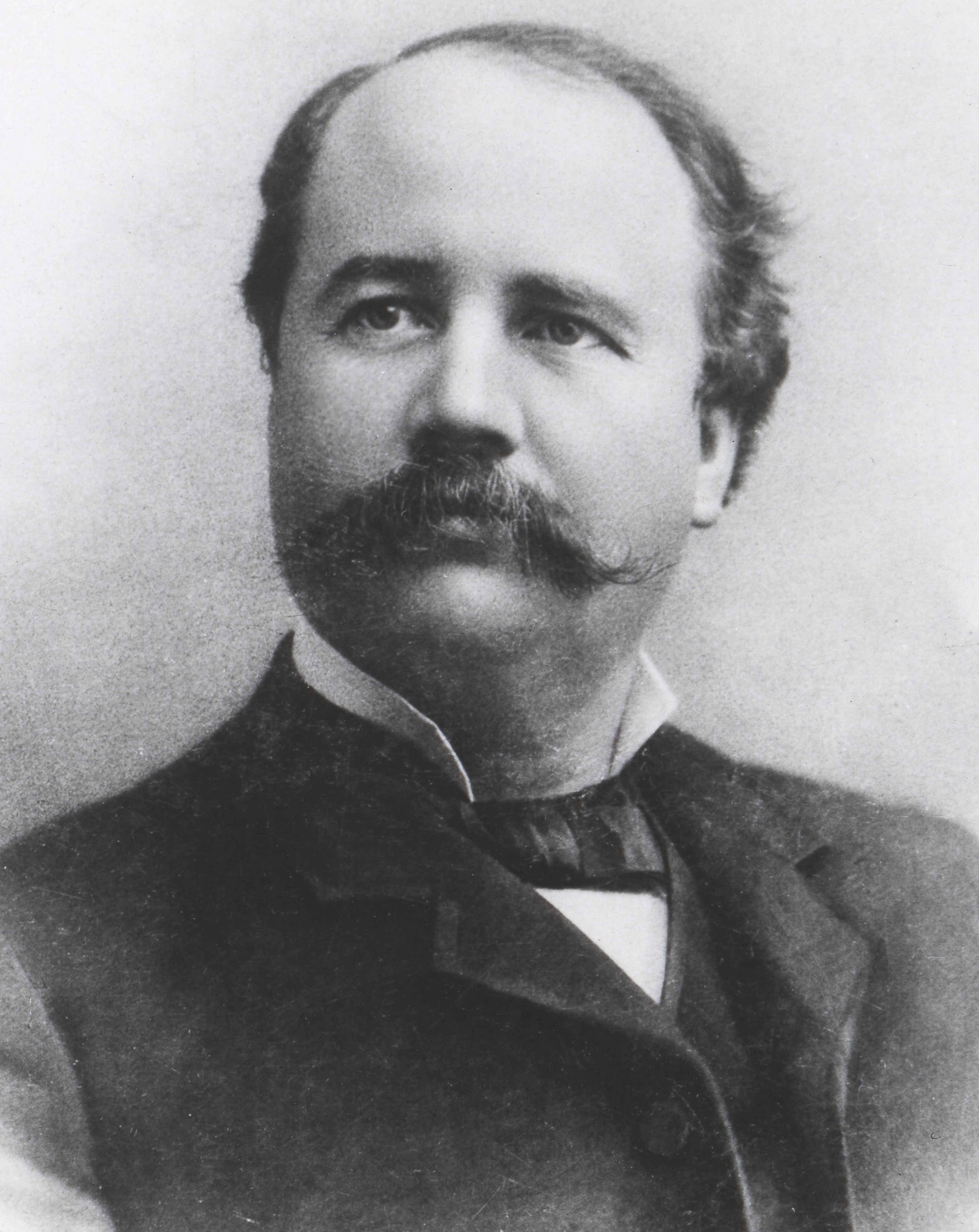
Garret Hobart

- November 16
  - Vincas Kudirka, Lithuanian doctor, poet and national hero (b. 1858)
  - Julius Hermann Moritz Busch, German publicist (b. 1821)
- November 21 – Garret Hobart, 24th Vice President of the United States (b. 1844)
- November 22 – Arthur Morgan, Member of Van der Linde Gang (b.1863)
- November 23 – Thomas Henry Ismay, British owner of the White Star Line (b. 1837)
- November 24 – Abdallahi ibn Muhammad, Sudanese political, religious leader (killed in battle) (b. 1846)
- November 28 – Virginia Oldoini, Countess of Castiglione (b. 1837)
- December 2 – Gregorio del Pilar, Filipino general (killed in battle) (b. 1875)
- December 10 – King Ngwane V of Swaziland (b. 1876)
- December 19 – Henry Ware Lawton, American general (killed in action) (b. 1843)
- December 22
  - Pascual Ortega Portales, Chilean painter (b. 1839)
  - Dwight L. Moody, American evangelist (b. 1837)
  - Hugh Grosvenor, 1st Duke of Westminster, British landowner and politician (b. 1825)
- December 30
  - Eugène Bertrand, 65, French comedian and opera house director (b. 1834)
- December 31
  - Jane Mitchel, Irish nationalist (b. c. 1820)
  - Carl Millöcker, 57, Viennese composer (b. 1842)
  - Manuel Carrillo Tablas, 77, Mexican philanthropist and mayor of Orizaba (b. 1822)

=== Date unknown ===
- Ellen Morton Littlejohn, American quilter (b. c. 1826)
