= Struck jury =

Method of jury selection

A struck jury is a multi-step process of selecting a jury from a pool. First potential jurors are eliminated for hardship. Second jurors are eliminated for cause by conducting voir dire until there is a pool available that is exactly the size of the final jury (including required alternates) plus the number of peremptory challenges available to each side. Then the two sides exercise their peremptory challenges on the remaining pool, usually alternating. This procedure "has its roots in ancient common law heritage".

Commentators have offered the following (and other) advantages of a struck jury over a "strike and replace" jury:

- It is capable of producing a less biased jury than the alternative;
- There is no reason to hold back on use of peremptories because lawyers have full knowledge of who will remain on the panel;
- Remedying an alleged Batson violation is easier, since court and counsel can view all the strikes and a ruling can be made before any juror is excused.

== Alternative use ==
In older usage, and still in some jurisdictions a struck jury entails the formation of a jury pool of men who possess special qualifications to judge of the facts of a case. This was a common provision in U.S. insanity cases in the late 19th century. This usage is more often called a special jury. It derives in part from the nomenclature in use in England in the 18th century.

== United Kingdom ==
=== England ===
There were four different non-standard types of jury in England while operating under common law. The first three were first recognized by Parliament in 1730 under the general term "special jury". The fourth was known by the Latin phrase jury de medietate linguae.

These were:

1. The gentleman jury – men of high social or economic status,
2. The struck jury – principal landowners selected from a list of forty-eight names,
3. The professional jury – members of special knowledge or expertise, and
4. The party jury – a jury for defendants at special risk of suffering prejudice that included either only or half individuals of the same race, sex, religion, or origin.

The special jury was used most extensively from 1770 to 1790, roughly during Lord Mansfield's tenure as Lord Chief Justice of the Court of King's Bench, and declined thereafter. The first statutory requirements for special jurors were introduced in the Juries Act 1825 (6 Geo. 4. c. 50), which required such jurors to be merchants, bankers, esquires, or persons of higher degree. The special jury was eliminated in 1949, excepting the City of London special jury that remained available until 1971 for commercial trials in the King's Bench Division of the High Court of Justice. The last case using a special jury occurred in London in 1950.

The jury de medietate linguae were abolished in the Naturalization Act 1870 (33 & 34 Vict. c. 14), which also gave foreigners the right to serve on juries.

== United States ==
This method may be used in many U.S. states. In some states it may be used for both criminal and civil cases, in other states for only one of the two kinds. In at least the state of Washington, it is the default method of choosing a jury. Some courts of appeals in the U.S. have determined that a struck jury offers greater opportunity to shape the final jury than the more common "sequential" (also known as "strike and replace" or "jury box") method, where peremptory challenges can only be issued against those jurors already seated, with no knowledge of the replacement.

The use of this system in murder cases, when properly enabled by statute, was held by the Supreme Court of the United States to be constitutional in Brown v. New Jersey, 175 U.S. 172 (1899).

Some methods of implementing a struck jury have handled waived challenges by eliminating the last identified member of the juror pool. In discrimination cases, this has been treated as identical to specifically challenging that juror. As a result, the now preferred method of handling waived challenges is to let the other side finish its challenges and then randomly eliminate jurors to get to the number needed.

== New Zealand ==
In New Zealand, the special jury has become obsolete and is no longer used. The need to provide special expertise through selection of jurors was eliminated by the introduction of expert witnesses, expert advisors to the judge, and administrative tribunals. The jury de medietate linguae from English common law was used for cases where a Māori was accused of a crime until it was abolished in 1961.

== Major or famous cases ==
=== King v. Zenger, 1735 ===
In 1735, John Peter Zenger, a newspaper publisher, was arrested and tried for libel against the governor of New York, which was then a colony of England. His first two lawyers were disbarred for attempting to turn the trial into an indictment of the governor. The judge appointed as lawyer John Chambers, who was a placeman of the governor. He then moved for a struck jury. The first panel created was not properly prepared by the clerk out of the book of potential jurors, and was overturned by the judges before use. The second was properly prepared, but the clerk or sheriff subsequently reordered the names to put a partisan of the governor as the foreman, which was also overturned. After the local attorney completed the process of getting an unbiased jury, Andrew Hamilton took over the defense, and won an acquittal on the grounds that the printed statements were true. Based on the law at the time, this was also an example of jury nullification.
