= Brown v. New Jersey =

- Supreme Court of the United States

Argued October 30, 1899 Decided November 20, 1899
- Full case name: James K. Brown, Plff. in Err. v. State of New Jersey
- Citations: 175 U.S. 172 (more) 20 S. Ct. 77; 44 L. Ed. 119

Case history
- Prior: Error to the Court of Oyer and Terminer of Hudson County, New Jersey

Holding
- The state has full control over court procedure consistent with constitutional guarantees. A New Jersey law limiting the number of peremptory challenges to five in cases of a struck jury did not violate the Fourteenth Amendment.

Court membership
- Chief Justice Melville Fuller Associate Justices John M. Harlan · Horace Gray; David J. Brewer · Henry B. Brown; George Shiras Jr. · Edward D. White; Rufus W. Peckham · Joseph McKenna

Case opinions
- Majority: Brewer, joined by Fuller, Gray, Brown, Shiras, White, Peckham, McKenna
- Concurrence: Harlan

Laws applied
- U.S. Const. amend. XIV

Brown v. New Jersey, 175 U.S. 172 (1899), is a United States Supreme Court case which held that the use of a struck jury did not violate the Fourteenth Amendment.

== Background ==
On October 5, 1898, James Brown was found guilty of murder in the court of oyer and terminer in Hudson County, New Jersey. He appealed to the New Jersey Court of Errors and Appeals, which affirmed the verdict. The case was remanded to the trial court, and Brown was sentenced to death by hanging. Brown was tried and sentenced under a state statute which provided for a struck jury and limited the defendant to five peremptory challenges. If tried by an ordinary jury, the state allowed for twenty peremptory challenges. The decision to use a struck jury was under the discretion of the court. Brown petitioned the Supreme Court to strike down the law as violative of the due process and equal protection clauses of the Fourteenth Amendment in the US.

== The Supreme Court's decision ==
Justice David J. Brewer delivered the opinion of the Court. Brewer concluded that the state had wide latitude in prescribing the rules of court procedure:

The state has full control over the procedure in its courts, both in civil and criminal cases, subject only to the qualification that such procedure must not work a denial of fundamental rights, or conflict with specific and applicable provisions of the Federal Constitution.

Brewer held that the due process clause had not been violated since the use of struck juries could be traced to the common law. Nor did the statute deny to the plaintiff equal protection of the law since it provided for an equal number of peremptory challenges in all cases tried by a struck jury.

== See also ==
- List of United States Supreme Court cases, volume 175
