= Natal Field Force =

Field force in the Boer Wars

- Active: 1880-1881; 1899-1900
- Country: United Kingdom
- Size: Field force
- Part of: Commander-in-Chief of British Forces in South Africa
- Engagements: First Boer War: Battle of Laing's Nek; Battle of Schuinshoogte; Battle of Majuba Hill; Second Boer War: Battle of Talana Hill; Battle of Elandslaagte; Battle of Ladysmith; Second Battle of Colenso; Battle of Spion Kop; Battle of Vaal Krantz; Battle of the Tugela Heights; Relief of Ladysmith; Battle of Laing's Nek (1900)

Commanders
- Notable commanders: Major-General Sir George Pomeroy Colley †; Major-General Sir Redvers Buller, VC

The Natal Field Force (NFF) was a multi-battalion field force originally formed by Major-General Sir George Pomeroy Colley in Natal for the First Boer War. It was later re-established for the Second Boer War (1899–1902) and commanded by Major-General Sir Redvers Buller VC GCB GCMG (although after the failed attack at Colenso he was replaced as overall commander in South Africa by Lord Roberts).

== First Boer War ==
The First Boer War broke out in December 1880 with the Boer Commando's in the Transvaal besieging British garrisons there. The Governor of Natal Sir George Pomeroy Colley raised the Natal Field Force which took part in the actions at Laing's Nek, Schuinshoogte and Majuba Hill.

It was composed of:

- 5 Companies of the 58th Regiment of Foot
- 5 Companies of the 3rd Battalion, 60th Rifles
- About 150 Cavalry
- A party of Royal Navy sailors
- 4 guns of the Royal Artillery

After Schuinshoogte the NFF was reinforced by 6 companies of the 92nd (Gordon) Highlanders and two squadrons of the 15th (The King's) Hussars.

== Second Boer War ==
At the outbreak of the Second Boer War General Sir George White was appointed Governor in Chief of Natal, superseding General Sir Penn Symons. Symons had already split his forces chiefly into two garrisons at Ladysmith and Dundee.

=== Ladysmith garrison ===
- 1st Battalion Devonshire Regiment
- 1st Battalion Liverpool Regiment and Mounted infantry company
- 19th Royal Hussars (Detachment)
- 5th Royal Irish Lancers
- Brigade division, Royal Artillery
- 10th Mountain Battery, Royal Garrison Artillery
- 23rd Company, Royal Engineers
- 26th British field hospital
- Colonial troops

=== Dundee garrison ===
- 1st Battalion Leicestershire Regiment and Mounted infantry company
- 1st Battalion King's Royal Rifle Corps and Mounted infantry company
- 2nd Battalion Royal Irish Fusiliers and Mounted infantry company
- 18th Royal Hussars
- Brigade division, Royal Artillery

=== Other garrisons ===
At Pietermaritzburg:

- 1st Battalion Manchester Regiment
- 2nd Battalion King's Royal Rifle Corps

At Escourt:

- Natal Naval Volunteers
- Natal Royal Rifles

At Colenso:

- Durban Light Infantry

After the battles at Talana Hill and Elandslaagte General White recalled the Dundee garrison and concentrated his forces in defence of Ladysmith.

== The Relief of Ladysmith ==
During the Second Boer War relief operation of the besieged town of Ladysmith, the NFF comprised:

=== Cleary's Division ===
General Cornelius Francis Clery's (2nd & 3rd) Division although temporarily commanded by Lyttelton for a time due to illness. The 3rd division was General Gatacre's command but most was diverted to Natal leaving him with only two and a half Battalions.

2nd Infantry Brigade commanded by General Sir Henry Hildyard

- 2nd Battalion, Devonshire Regiment
- 2nd Battalion, West Surrey Regiment
- 2nd Battalion, West Yorkshire Regiment
- 2nd Battalion, East Surrey Regiment

4th Infantry Brigade initially commanded by General The Hon. Neville Lyttelton and later by Colonel Charles Norcott.

- 2nd Battalion, Cameronians (Scottish Rifles)
- 3rd Battalion, King's Royal Rifle Corps
- 1st Battalion, Durham Light Infantry
- 1st Battalion, Rifle Brigade

5th Infantry Brigade commanded by General Arthur FitzRoy Hart-Synnot

- 1st Battalion, Royal Inniskilling Fusiliers
- 1st Battalion, Connaught Rangers
- 2nd Battalion, Royal Dublin Fusiliers
- 1st Battalion, Border Regiment

6th Infantry Brigade commanded by General Geoffrey Barton

- 2nd Battalion, Royal Fusiliers
- 2nd Battalion, Royal Scots Fusiliers
- 1st Battalion, Royal Welch Fusiliers
- 2nd Battalion, Royal Irish Fusiliers

=== Cavalry Division ===
The (ad hoc) Cavalry Division commanded by Colonel Douglas Cochrane, 12th Earl of Dundonald

- 1st The Royal Dragoons
- 13th Hussars
- 14th Hussars (2 squadrons) arrived after the battle of Spion Kop
- Bethune's Mounted Infantry
- Thorneycroft's Mounted Infantry (4 companies)
- South African Light Horse (4 squadrons)
- The Composite Mounted Irregulars:
  - 5th Squadron Natal Carbineers
  - Imperial Light Horse
  - Detachment Natal police
  - One Mounted Infantry Company

=== Artillery ===
Artillery commanded by Lieutenant-colonel Charles James Long, RA

1st Brigade Royal Artillery commanded by Lieutenant-colonel Henry Vaughan Hunt, RA

- 7th Field Battery
- 14th Field Battery
- 66th Field Battery
- One Naval Twelve Pounder Battery (10 × 12-pounders) (HMS Terrible)

2nd Brigade Royal Artillery commanded by Lieutenant-colonel Lawrence Worthington Parsons, RA

- 63rd Field Battery
- 64th Field Battery

Naval Artillery Brigade commanded by Captain Edward Pitcairn Jones, RN (HMS Forte)

- One Heavy Battery 2 × 4.7-inch guns
- One Section, Twelve Pounder Battery (2 × 12-pounders) (HMS Tartar)

Misc unit's that joined after the battle of Spion Kop

- A Mountain Battery
- A Battery Royal Horse Artillery
- 2x Great Fortress Guns.

=== Warren's Division ===
General Sir Charles Warren's (5th) Division (later succeeded by Hildyard) joined up with the main body of the force shortly after the Battle of Colenso.

11th Infantry Brigade initially commanded by General Edward Woodgate but he was wounded at Spion Kop and died shortly afterwards. He was succeeded by General Arthur Wynne who was later wounded at the Battle of the Tugela Heights and succeeded by Colonel Walter Kitchener.

- 2nd Battalion Kings Own Royal Lancaster's
- 2nd Battalion Lancashire Fusiliers
- 1st Battalion South Lancashire Regiment
- 1st Battalion York and Lancaster Regiment

10th Infantry Brigade commanded by General John Talbot Coke.

- Imperial Light Infantry
- 2nd Battalion Dorset Regiment
- 2nd Battalion Middlesex Regiment
- 2nd Battalion Somerset Light Infantry
- (Yorkshire's and Warwickshire's being left at Cape Colony

=== Support troops ===
Royal Engineers commanded by Lieutenant-colonel George Hamilton Sim (may not have been present)

- 17th Field Company
- "A" Pontoon Troop

== Sources ==
- Natal Army, www.legionwargames.com
- Churchill, W.S. London to Ladysmith via Pretoria, London: Longmans, Green & Co. 1900 at Project Gutenberg
- Churchill, W.S. Ian Hamilton's March, London: Longmans, Green & Co. 1900 at Project Gutenberg
- Pakenham, Thomas (1979). The Boer War. Weidenfeld & Nicolson. ISBN 0-7474-0976-5.
