= Equestrian statue of Sir Redvers Buller =

Statue in Exeter, Devon, England

Coordinates: 50°43′41″N 3°32′14″W

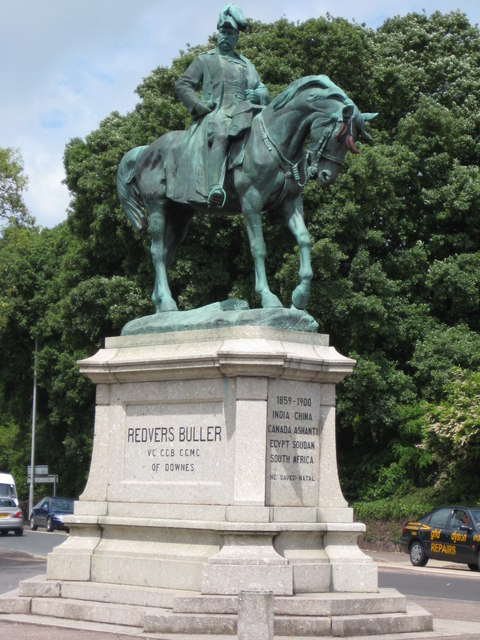
Equestrian statue of General Sir Redvers Buller in Exeter

An equestrian statue of General Sir Redvers Buller stands at the junction of Hele Road and New North Road, close to Exeter College, Exeter, between St David's Church, Exeter and Bury Meadow Park. It was unveiled in 1905, and the bronze statue is mounted on a plinth of Cornish granite. It became a Grade II listed building in 1953.

== Background ==
Buller was the second son and eventual heir of James Wentworth Buller (1798–1865), MP for Exeter, by his wife Charlotte Juliana Jane Howard-Molyneux-Howard (d.1855), third daughter of Lord Henry Thomas Howard-Molyneux-Howard, Deputy Earl Marshal and younger brother of Bernard Howard, 12th Duke of Norfolk. Redvers Buller was born on 7 December 1839 at the family estate of Downes, near Crediton in Devon, inherited by his great-grandfather James Buller (1740–1772) from his mother Elizabeth Gould, the wife of James Buller (1717–1765), MP.

Buller was appointed commander of the British Army forces sent to South Africa in the opening phases of the Second Boer War, from October 1899 to January 1900. He had served in several colonial campaigns and as a lieutenant colonel won the Victoria Cross in retreat after the Battle of Hlobane in the Anglo-Zulu War.

Buller died on 2 June 1908, at the family seat, Downes House, Crediton, Devon, and is buried in the churchyard of Holy Cross Church in Crediton.

== Description ==
The bronze statue was paid for by public subscription which raised over £2,000 from 50,000 people. It was made by Adrian Jones in 1902 and cast at the foundry of A.B. Burton in Thames Ditton. It depicts Buller in his uniform as a general, in a greatcoat and plumed bicorn, wearing his Victoria Cross, and riding his horse "Biffen". The bronze statue weighs 4.5 tons. The rectangular granite plinth, which weighs 35 tons, was a gift of John St Aubyn, 1st Baron St Levan, and was carved by Pethick Brothers of Plymouth. The statue is facing away from Buller's birthplace and family estate at Downes, Crediton.

One face of the plinth bears a bronze badge of the King's Royal Rifle Corps, a crowned Maltese cross, and the Latin motto of the corps: "Celer et Audax" ("Swift and Bold"). The three other faces each bear inscriptions – one giving his name and honours, "Redvers Buller / VC GCB GCMG / of Downes"; another listing his military services, "1859-1900 / India China / Canada Ashanti / Egypt Soudan [sic] / South Africa / He Saved Natal", with the last referring to his service in the Boer War and the relief of Ladysmith, notwithstanding defeats at the battles of Colenso and Spion Kop; and the last recording that the statue was "Erected / by his countrymen / at home and beyond the seas / 1905".

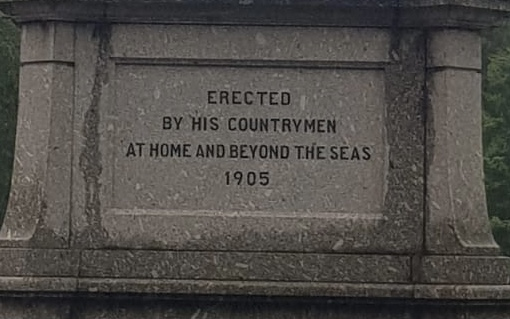
Redvers Buller statue, front side

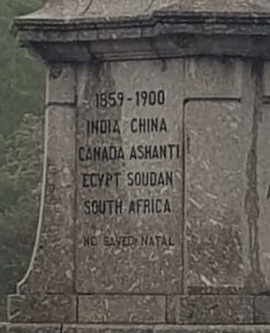
Redvers Buller statue, back side

== Reception ==
It was unveiled on 6 September 1905 by the Lord Lieutenant of Devon, Lord Ebrington, a late substitute for Garnet Wolseley, 1st Viscount Wolseley who was indisposed through influenza. Buller attended the unveiling, with his wife Lady Audrey and daughter Georgina, with a guard of honour from the 1st Rifle Volunteers. The ceremony drew a crowd of several thousand. A choir sang "Land of Hope and Glory", and the band of the 4th Battalion, King's Royal Rifles, played "God Save the Queen". After the unveiling, the band also performed to crowds in Northernhay Park, Belmont Pleasure Grounds and St Thomas Belmont Pleasure Grounds; Buller and his family attended a reception at the Victoria Hall in Queen Street (which was demolished after being damaged by fire in 1919); and a celebratory tea was served to 500 military veterans in Bury Meadow Park.

Buller died at his home at Downes, Crediton in 1908, and is buried at Crediton Parish Church.

The statue became a Grade II listed building in 1953.

In January 2021, a five-person committee of Exeter City Council councillors voted to seek permission to move the statue from its location near Exeter College, "because of the man it portrays [and] because of the names carved on the plinth of colonial campaigns which sought to advance British imperialist interests in other countries", which means "the current location is inappropriate because it is outside an educational establishment, which includes young people from diverse backgrounds". Three members voted for moving and two voted against.

In spring 2021, they voted in favour of installing information boards as well as other projects and training.

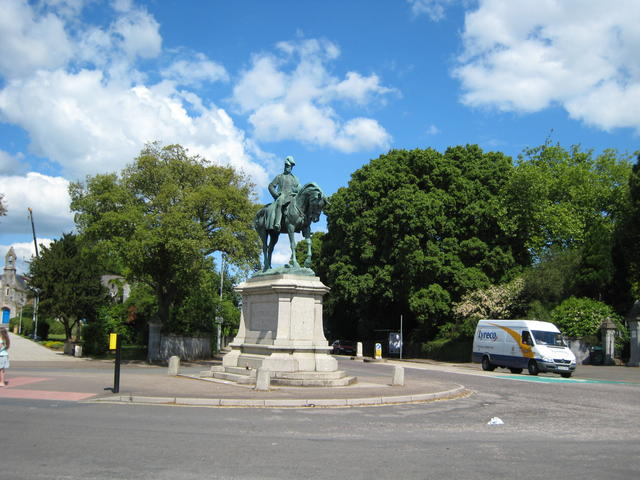
View of the statue, facing Bury Meadow Park

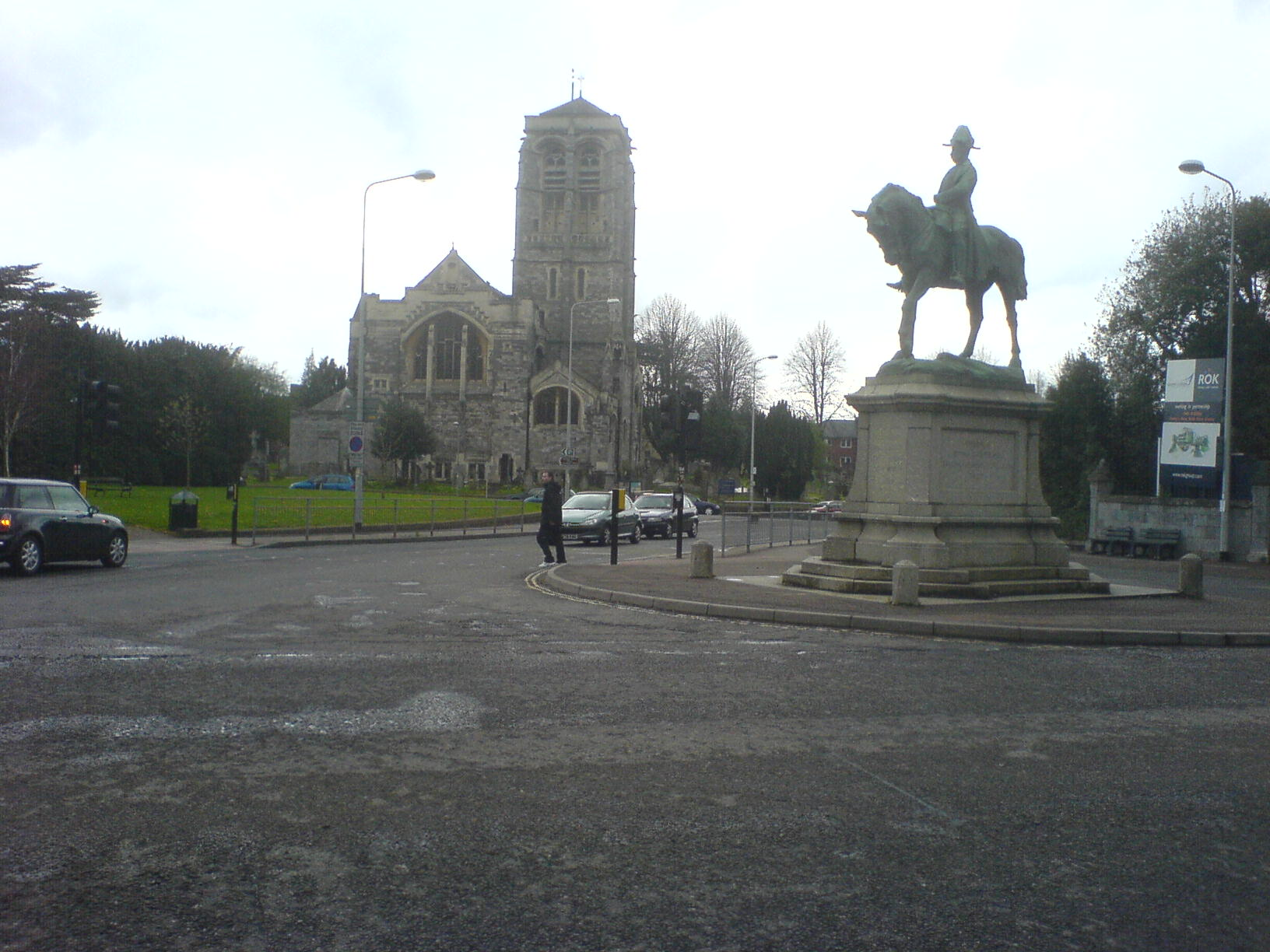
View of the statue, facing St David's Church
