= South African Light Horse =

South African Light Horse (SALH)
- Cap badge of the SALH
- Active: 8 Nov 1899 – 1907
- Disbanded: 1907
- Country: Cape Colony
- Branch: British Army
- Type: Light Horse Regiment
- Size: 600 men in 8 Squadrons
- Nickname: Cockyolibirds or Sakabulas
- Motto: Usibu njalo nga pambili (Zulu) or "Feathers at the Front"
- Engagements: Colenso, Spion Kop, Vaal Krantz, Tugela Heights

Commanders
- Lieutenant Colonel: Julian Byng

Insignia
- Badge: Maltese Cross inscribed with SALH 1899

The South African Light Horse regiment of the British Army were raised in Cape Colony in 1899 and disbanded in 1907.

The commanding officer tasked with raising the regiment was Major (locally a Lieutenant Colonel) the Honourable Julian Byng (10th Hussars) who would go on to rise to the rank of Field Marshal).

The future Prime Minister of the United Kingdom Winston Churchill served as a lieutenant in the SALH from January to July 1900.

== Relief of Ladysmith ==
The regiment was formed in November 1899, just one month after the start of the Second Boer War, and by December of that year 8 squadrons had been raised from Uitlanders. They were largely financed by Wernher-Beit & co. and together with the Imperial Light Horse they effectively formed a Uitlander army. A small portion were used to protect the railway line to De Aar but they mostly served as a part of the Mounted Brigade of the Natal Field Force under Lieutenant-General Douglas Cochrane the 12th Earl of Dundonald, taking part in the relief of the besieged town of Ladysmith.

The Boers had encircled Ladysmith trapping a force of 13,000 British troops under the command of Lieutenant General Sir George White inside (along with separate sieges in Mafeking and Kimberley). The relief effort was dispatched from Cape Town under the command of General Sir Redvers Buller and by early December 1899 this 20,000 strong relieving army was arriving just south of the river Tugela.

=== Battle of Colenso ===
Buller launched his first major offensive against the Boer lines across the Tugela river on 15 December 1899 and the 3 squadrons of the SALH along with the rest of Dundonald's Mounted Brigade were aligned to cover the right flank of the battle formation. Their orders were to "endeavour to take up a position on Hlangwane Hill", a task in which they made good progress but eventually they were pinned down and lacking any chance of infantry reinforcement they were ordered by the General to withdraw.

=== Battle of Spion Kop ===
The attack on Colenso having failed Buller moved the focus of his army, now swollen to 30,000 men with the addition of Sir Charles Warren's division, to the west in January 1900. The target was to break through on the enemy's right flank for which they would discover they would need to capture and hold a 430 meter high hill called Spion Kop. A portion of the SALH remained at Chieveley with Major General Geoffrey Barton whose orders were to entrench there and protect the head of the communications line, but 4 squadrons moved westward with Dundonald.

On 11 January the Earl of Dundonald's Mounted Division which comprised approximately 3000 Cavalry marched to Pretorius's Farm, the South African Light Horse were tasked with protecting the baggage column but they reached their objective by noon. With the exception of the Royal Dragoons the cavalry now advanced to seize a bridge across the Little Tugela River at Springfield, which when they arrived they found unoccupied and none of the patrols found any Boers in the area. With some encouragement from his subordinates Dundonald decided to exceed his orders and push on towards the heights above Potgieter's Ferry which they reached around 6 pm to find an already fortified position left unguarded and unoccupied. They named their new position Spearman's Hill and sent back a request for urgent reinforcements. Next day six volunteers of the SALH led by Lieutenant Carlisle swam across the river to capture the ferry and brought the punt back to their side. Churchill described this as a "dashing exploit of which the regiment... are immensely proud" in his book "London to Ladysmith via Pretoria". On the 13th their position was strengthened by the arrival of two battalions of Lyttelton's 4th brigade and Sir Redvers Buller established his headquarters in this camp.

It took almost another week for the rest of the army to get into position and all the while the Boers were preparing their defence. During this period Colonel Byng took 2 squadrons to the top of a high hill overlooking a road from Colenso to Potgieter's and there attacked five Boer Ox wagons laden with supplies but they escaped. The SALH also went to support a patrol of Bethune's Mounted Infantry that needed to be extricated.

On 17 January Dundonald's Mounted Division with the exception of Bethune's crossed Waggon drift where a Trooper of the 13th Hussars was accidentally drowned. The next day the cavalry set out to discover the western flank of the Boer lines with the Composite Regiment at the head of the column who just after midday were able to ambush a column of about 200 Boers near Acton Homes and successfully trapped about 40 of them. A squadron of the SALH joined in reinforcing the attack and by dusk the Boers surrendered.

Warren's main attack started on 20 January and Lord Dundonald ordered Colonel Byng to seize a hill which they subsequently named Bastion Hill. Byng sent two squadrons of the SALH unmounted to ascend the hill while the remaining squads gave covering fire with rifles and 3 machine guns but they had no artillery support. Major Childe successfully lead the attack as the Boers fled from the summit however, just like at Spion Kop the crest of the hill was exposed to the enemy artillery and Childe was killed by a fragment from an exploding shell. They were relieved that night by 2 companies of the Queen's Royal (West Surrey) Regiment.

Spion Kop was attacked and held between the 23–24 but ultimately the whole force retreated back across the Tugela River.

=== Battle of Vaal Krantz ===
In the battle of Vaal Krantz (5 to 7 February) Lyttelton's brigade successfully captured and occupied the Vaal Krantz ridge but it was deemed unsuitable for the British artillery and further progress without artillery support would be difficult and therefore, another withdrawal was ordered. The regular Cavalry led by Colonel John Burn-Murdoch (1st The Royal Dragoons), were to cover the left flank while the irregulars (including the SALH) were to cover the right flank and rear.

=== Battle of Tugela Heights ===
Even as they withdrew from the Vaal Krantz attack, moving the army back to Chievely, plans were being made for the next attempt and on 12 February Dundonald's brigade were sent to thoroughly reconnoitre a feature called Hussar Hill (so called because a small post of the 13th Hussars had been surprised on it 6 weeks earlier and had 2 men killed). The mounted irregulars took with them a Colt Battery, the 1st Battalion Royal Welch Fusiliers and a battery of Field Artillery, and they successfully occupied the hill giving Sir Redvers Buller the opportunity to reconnaissance the ground until they were ordered to withdraw at 1 pm. As they were making their way back to Chieveley they were forced to engage in a fierce rear guard action in which a young Lieutenant John Spencer-Churchill of the SALH was shot through the leg. Two days later the SALH were back as the advanced party to occupy the hill permanently, once again being backed up by the Welch Fusiliers and eventually by 3 whole infantry brigades and artillery.

The next two days were fought out by the artillery of both sides but on the 17th the general attack began on Cingolo Ridge and Monte Cristo Ridge. Dundonald's mounted brigade left at day break to ride 10 miles east of Hussar Hill through rough and broken terrain eventually turning to ascend the eastern slope of Cingolo hill and thus coming up on the far right flank of the Boer's defences. As two squadrons began to clear the hill they were supported by the Queen's Royal Regiment of Hildyard's infantry brigade and the rest of the cavalry descended into the plain of the far side of the ridge to chase the retreating enemy. The following day Hildyard's brigade seized Monte Cristo Ridge and the irregular cavalry rushed forward to occupy its eastern spur. Green hill and Hlangwani hill would fall next.

The cavalry now had to wait as the infantry and guns fought a hard action across the Tugela firstly against the Boer's Pieters position then later by a flanking manoeuvre along the Hlangwani plateau.

== Orange River Colony ==
In the second phase of the war the regiment were mostly employed in the Orange River Colony.
