= Geoffrey Barton =

British Army general (1844–1922)

Major-General Sir Geoffrey Barton KCVO CB CMG KStJ
- Born: 22 February 1844; Stuttgardt, Germany
- Died: 8 July 1922 (aged 78); Dumfries, Scotland
- Military career
- Allegiance: United Kingdom
- Branch: British Army
- Service years: 1862-1904
- Rank: Major-General
- Unit: Royal Fusiliers
- Commands: 6th (Fusiliers) Brigade
- Conflicts: Jirbinbah, Kumasi, Gingindlovu, Kassasin, Tel el-Kebir, Colenso, Vaal Krantz, Tugela Heights
- Awards: KCVO, CB, CMG, KStJ
- Other work: Magistrate in Dumfries; Red Cross Society; Boy Scout Movement

Major-General Sir Geoffrey Barton (22 February 1844 – 8 July 1922) of the 7th Regiment of Foot (Royal Fusiliers), served the British Army from 1862 until 1904. Although he saw service in Ireland, Hong Kong and India, the majority of his campaigns were on the African continent. During the Second Boer War he was put in command of the 6th Brigade of the South Natal Field Force, taking part in the Relief of Ladysmith and the Relief of Mafeking. When he retired to Scotland he took an interest in local politics, the Red Cross Society and the Boy Scout Movement.

== Early life and family ==
Born in Stuttgart, Germany on 22 February 1844 to Charles Cutts Barton and Emelia Ann Hastings Barton, he was educated at Eton College and he purchased his commission as an ensign on 30 October 1862 and posted to the 1st Battalion which was at the time stationed in Firozpur, Punjab, India. He was promoted to lieutenant in 1865.

In 1890 he married Beryl Marie Baskerville Mackenzie and they had 3 children; Philip Geoffrey 1891, Charles Henry 1893 & Joanna Katherine 1894.

== Military career ==
=== Early years ===
Between 1869 and 1873 Barton was an adjutant in the 1st Battalion of the Royal Fusiliers, but in January 1874 he was selected for special service with the 2nd Battalion, Royal Welsh Fusiliers in West Africa for the Ashanti Expedition under General Sir Garnet Wolseley. He was wounded during the campaign and was mentioned in dispatches for his services in the engagements at Jarbinbah and Kumasi. In November 1874 he was drafted into the Royal Welsh Fusiliers as a captain; however, within a year he would transfer back to his old regiment.

In October 1874 Captain Barton was appointed as aide-de-camp to Major General Shipley, the commander of a brigade at Aldershot.

=== Zulu War ===
At the outbreak of the Zulu War in 1879 Captain Barton was initially sent over with an appointment on the general staff but later was put in command of the 4th Battalion, Natal Native Contingent where was present at the Battle of Gingindlovu and he gained a promotion to Brevet (military) Major.

After the war he returned to England and attended Staff College, he was promoted to major by his regiment in July 1881 and passed out of the college in December.

=== Africa and Asia ===
In September 1882 British forces commanded by Lieutenant General Sir Garnet Wolseley landed in the Canal Zone of Egypt to help suppress a revolt led by Ahmed Orabi. Major Barton was appointed as commandant of the Foot Police and was present at the Egyptian attack at Kassasin and the Battle of Tel el-Kebir where he was promoted to Brevet lieutenant colonel.

From January 1884 to February 1885 Lieutenant Colonel Barton served in Hong Kong, China as an assistant military secretary to Major General John Sargent, after which he performed a similar duty in Suakin, Sudan, during the Nile Expedition for Lieutenant General Sir Gerald Graham until June 1885.

He then spent several years in Britain, being promoted to major general on 27 October 1898.

=== Second Boer War ===
At the outbreak of the Second Boer War, Major General Barton arrived in South Africa in November 1899 and joined General Sir Redvers Buller's Natal Field Force in command of the 6th (Fusiliers) Brigade (often referred to by Sir Winston Churchill as "Barton's Brigade" in his book From London to Ladysmith via Pretoria).

Buller's first objective was the Relief of Ladysmith, to which end he moved his army up from Cape Town via Pietermaritzburg to Frere, just south of the Tugela River, the north of which the Boers had placed their defensive line. During the first attempt to cross the Tugela at the Battle of Colenso, Barton's Brigade were in reserve but when the attackers were forced to withdraw, Barton cautiously chose not to send support.

Next, Buller tried to turn the Boers' right flank by sending the bulk of his army to the west and attacking Spion Kop whilst Barton was left to entrench at Chieveley to protect the head of the communications line. A third attempt to cross the Tugela at Vaal Krantz also failed.

The Battle of the Tugela Heights was a series of battles fought initially to the south but then across the north banks of the Tugela river. Once Hussar Hill had been captured by Dundonald's Mounted Brigade and Lyttelton's 4th Infantry Division had taken Cingolo Hill, Barton's brigade moved to capture Green Hill whilst Hildyard's Brigade captured the height of Monte Cristo. On 27 February, Barton's Brigade attacked Pieters Hill behind a creeping artillery barrage and was rapid at first until they moved out of observation range of the field artillery and the Boers having reinforced, the attack stalled. Fortunately for the British, the rest of the general movement was taking its toll on the Boers and they were forced to abandon the heights, clearing the way for the relief of Ladysmith on 1 March. Barton was injured during the action on 27 February. He subsequently served with the 10th division in connection with the Relief of Mafeking.

After Ladysmith and Mafeking had been relieved, Major General Barton was sent to the Western Transvaal, where he commanded in the Krugersdorp and Pretoria districts until the end of the war in early June 1902. He left Cape Town on the SS Canada and returned to Southampton in late July 1902.

For his service in the war, he was mentioned in despatches (including by Lord Kitchener dated 23 June 1902), and appointed a Companion of the Order of St Michael and St George (CMG).

== Later life ==
Geoffrey Barton retired from the British Army in August 1904 and settled in Craige, Dumfriesshire, Scotland where he took an interest in local affairs, the Red Cross Society and the Boy Scout Movement. He died on 8 July 1922 aged 78.

== Awards and Medals ==
- Knight Commander of the Royal Victorian Order (KCVO) - 1906
- Companion of the Order of the Bath (CB) - 1889
- Companion of the Order of St Michael and St George (CMG) - 1902
- Knight of Grace of the Order of St John of Jerusalem

Honorary titles
Preceded by Sir Richard Wilbraham	Colonel of the Royal Fusiliers (City of London Regiment); 1900–1922	Succeeded by Colin Donald
