= SALH =

SALH may refer to:

- Semi-active laser homing, a form of laser guidance
- South African Light Horse, a former British Army unit established in the Cape Colony during the Boer War
- South Alberta Light Horse, a reserve armoured-reconnaissance regiment of the Canadian Army based in Alberta
