= Second Battle of Colenso =

1899 battle of the Second Boer War

Battle of Colenso
- Part of the Second Boer War
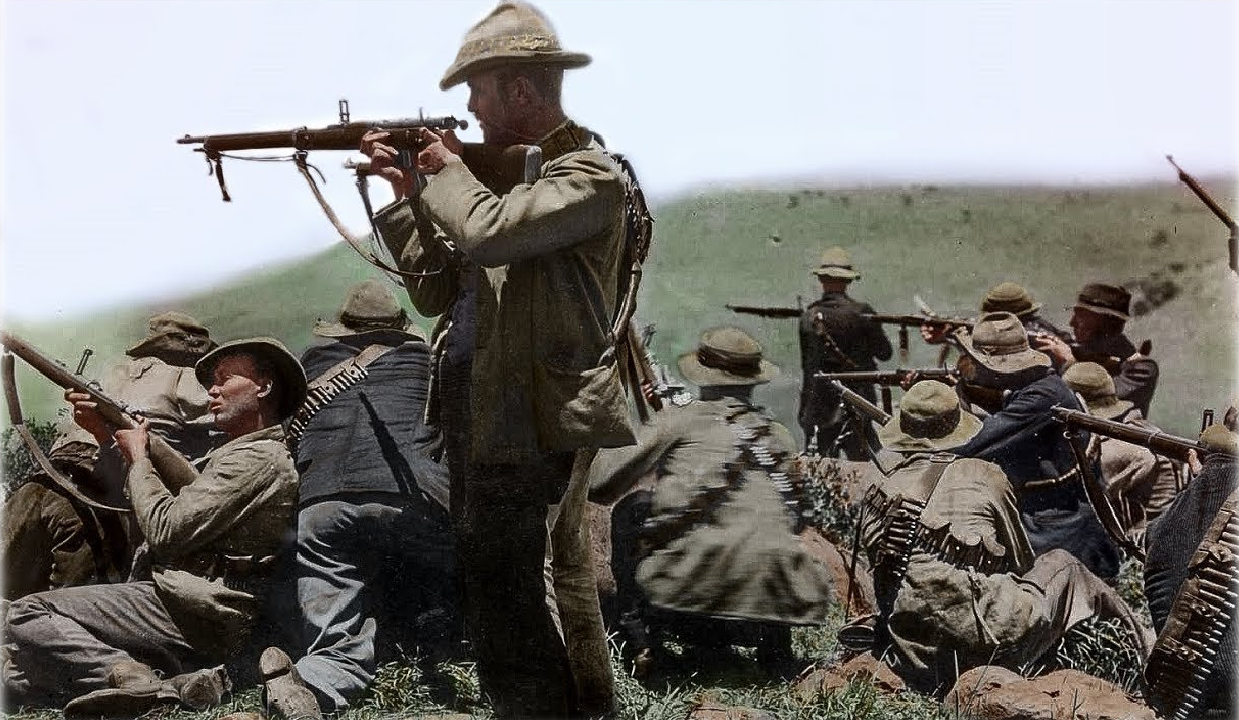
- Boer Commando in action during the battle
Date	15 December 1899
Location	Colenso, South Africa
Result	Boer victory

Belligerents
United Kingdom: Cape Colony; Colony of Natal	South African Republic; Orange Free State

Commanders and leaders
Redvers Buller	Louis Botha

Strength
14,000 infantry; 2,700 mounted troops; 44 guns	4,500

Casualties and losses
143 killed; 755 wounded; 240 missing; 10 guns captured	8 killed; 30 wounded

The Second Battle of Colenso, also known as the Battle of Colenso, was the third and final battle fought during the Black Week of the Second Boer War. It was fought between British and Boer forces from the independent South African Republic and Orange Free State in and around Colenso, Natal, South Africa on 15 December 1899.

Inadequate preparation, lack of reconnaissance and uninspired leadership led to a British defeat.

== Background ==
Shortly before the outbreak of the war, General Sir Redvers Buller VC was dispatched to South Africa at the head of an army corps, and appointed Commander-in-Chief of British Forces in South Africa. On arrival, he found British garrisons besieged on widely separated fronts, with limited communications between the fronts. Having detached forces under Generals Lord Methuen and Gatacre to the western and central fronts, Buller assumed command of his largest detachment and proposed to lead it to the relief of a besieged British force in Ladysmith, in Natal.

On this front, the Boers had conducted some raids and reconnaissances into the southern part of the province, but in the face of a large British army, they had retired north of the Tugela River at Colenso and dug in there, blocking the road and railway line to Ladysmith. Buller originally intended making a flank march to cross the Tugela at Potgieter's Drift 80 kilometres (50 mi) upstream of Colenso. On hearing that Gatacre and Methuen had been defeated at the battles of Stormberg and Magersfontein, Buller felt he needed to relieve Ladysmith as soon as possible and resume overall command of the forces in South Africa, and was worried that a move to Potgieter's would put him out of telegraph communications with the rest of South Africa. He also lacked wagons and draught animals, and feared that a defeat at Potgieter's Drift would leave his force isolated and trapped. He decided to make a frontal assault at Colenso after two days' artillery bombardment, beginning on 13 December.

== Boer plans ==
Piet Joubert, Commandant-General of the Transvaal, had been incapacitated after falling from his horse. As a result, Louis Botha assumed command of the Boers on this front. The basic Boer fighting unit was the commando, nominally consisting of all the available fighting men from a district, led by an elected Commandant and administered by a Feldcornet. Botha had nine such commandos and the Swaziland Police available. He deployed his main force north of the river, covering the drifts (fords). His plan was to open fire when the British were about to cross, or were crossing, the river, enfilade their right flank and rear with a force deployed on a hill known as Hlangwane south of the river, and attack their left with another force which would cross the river several kilometres upstream.

The preparatory British artillery fire missed the camouflaged Boer trenches, but the defenders of Hlangwane abandoned their positions and retreated across the river. After exhortations arrived by telegram from President Paul Kruger of the South African Republic, detachments selected by drawing lots reoccupied Hlangwane the day before Buller attacked.

Botha deployed the Middelburg and Johannesburg commandos, with a contingent from the Orange Free State, at Robinson's Drift, 13 kilometres (8 mi) upstream from Colenso; the Ermelo commando at the Bridle Drift 5 kilometres (3 mi) upstream from Colenso; the Zoutpansberg commando and the Swaziland police at the Punt Drift at the end of a loop in the river east of the Bridle Drift, the Heidelberg, Vryheid and Krugersdorp commandos in a range of low kopjes and the river bank at Colenso itself, and the Wakkerstroom and Standerton commandos on Hlangwane.

== British plans ==
Buller was handicapped by a shortage of competent staff officers, as most of them had been dispersed from his corps, like the corps itself, to the various distant fronts throughout South Africa. He also lacked information on the geography of the area, and possessed only a sparsely detailed blueprint map based on railway and farm surveys, and a crude sketch map made by an artillery officer.

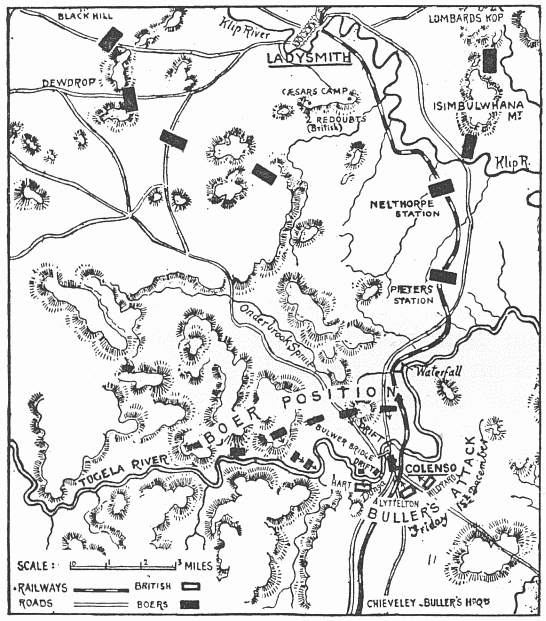
Buller's attempt to cross the Tugela River

The British force in Natal had been grouped under Major-General Francis Clery's 2nd Division, and Buller allowed Clery to plan the attack. The 5th (Irish) Brigade, was to cross at the Bridle Drift. The brigade consisted of the 1st Royal Inniskilling Fusiliers, the 1st Connaught Rangers, 2nd Royal Dublin Fusiliers, and the 1st Border Regiment, and was commanded by the confident Major General Arthur Fitzroy Hart. The 7th Battery of the Royal Artillery under Colonel L.W. Parsons was to support Hart's attack. Meanwhile, the 2nd Brigade under Major-General Henry J. T. Hildyard would occupy the village itself (where there was another ford and two bridges across the Tugela, although one bridge had already been demolished). Hildyard's brigade consisted of the 2nd Devonshire Regiment, the 2nd Queen's Royal Regiment (West Surrey), the 2nd West Yorkshire Regiment, and the 2nd East Surrey Regiment. Its attack was to be supported by artillery (the 14th and 66th Field Batteries of the Royal Artillery and a battery of six naval 12-pounder guns) under Colonel C.J. Long.

A regiment of regular cavalry, the 1st Royal Dragoons, under Colonel J.F. Burn-Murdoch, protected the left flank. On the right flank, Buller intended that a brigade of colonial light horse and mounted infantry under Lord Dundonald, would capture Hlangwane. Although Buller recognised that Hlangwane was a difficult position to assault, he anticipated that once Hart's and Hildyard's troops had established bridgeheads on the north bank of the Tugela, the Boers would abandon the hill for fear of being isolated. Dundonald's brigade consisted of Bethune's Mounted Infantry (three companies), Thorneycroft's Mounted Infantry (three companies), the South African Light Horse (three squadrons) and a composite regiment made of one squadron of the Imperial Light Horse, one squadron of the Natal Carbineers and two companies of mounted infantry detached from British infantry units.

Two more infantry brigades were in reserve: they were the 4th (Light) Brigade under Major General Neville Lyttelton (consisting of the 2nd Cameronians (Scottish Rifles), the 1st Rifle Brigade (Prince Consort's Own), the 3rd King's Royal Rifle Corps and the 1st Durham Light Infantry), and the 6th (Fusilier) Brigade under Major General Geoffrey Barton (consisting of the 2nd Royal Fusiliers, the 2nd Scots Fusiliers, the 1st Royal Welch Fusiliers, and the 2nd Royal Irish Fusiliers).

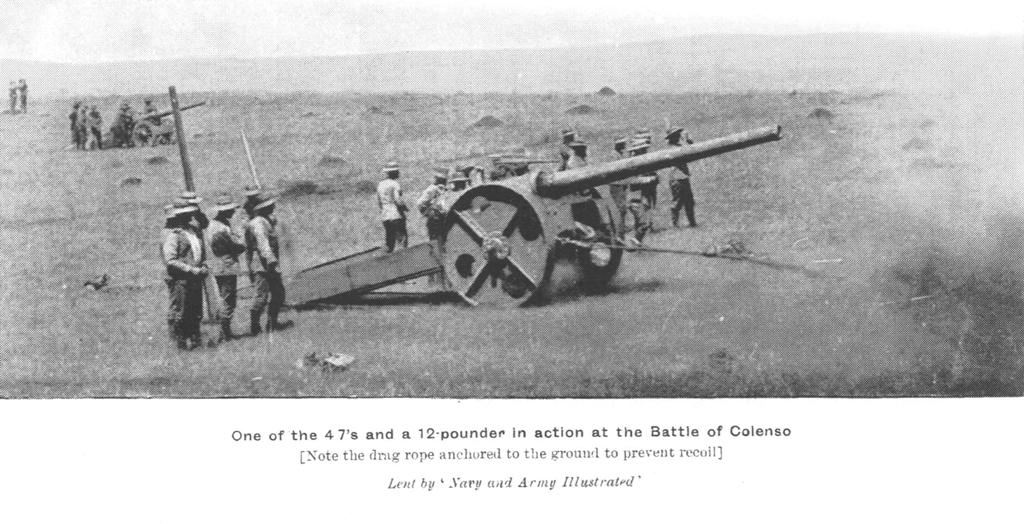
Quick firing 120 mm (4.7 inch) gun in action at Colenso

Buller also had another two batteries of field artillery (63rd and 64th), and another battery of eight naval 12-pounder guns and two 4.7-inch (120 mm) naval guns to support the flanking mounted troops or in reserve.

== Battle ==
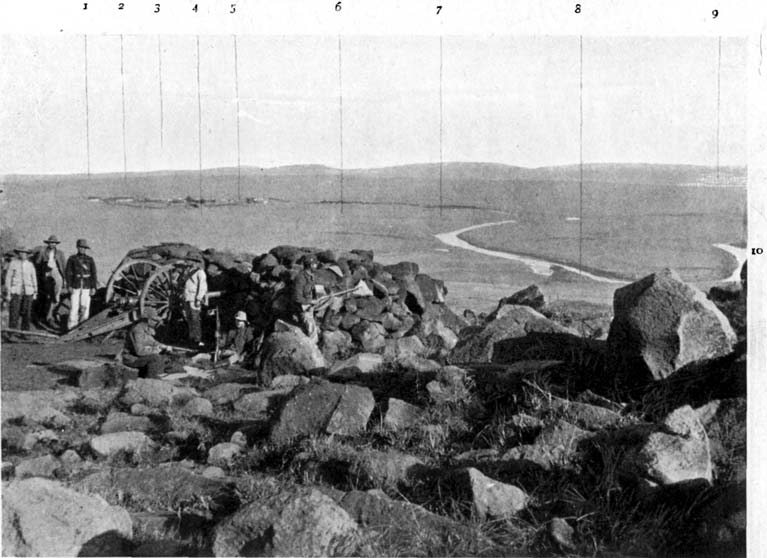
Battlefield of Colenso on Dec 15, 1899 just before the battle.: 1: General Louis Botha's Commandos; 2: Boksburg Commando; 3: Village of Colenso; 4: Krugersdorp Commando; 5: Wakkerstroom Commando; 6: Ermelo Commando; 7: Swaziland Police; 8: Ermelo Commando; 9: British Camp, Chievely; 10: Tugela River

Early on the morning of 15 December, Hart gave his men half an hour's parade ground drill, then led them in close column towards the Bridle Drift. However, his locally recruited guide, who spoke no English, led the brigade towards the wrong ford, the Punt Drift at the end of a loop in the river at 28°43′57″S 29°47′16″E. Hart was also misled by Buller's crude sketch map which showed a stream, the Doornkop, entering the Tugela east of the loop whereas it actually entered to the west. (The loop can be clearly seen to the right of the adjacent photograph.) Botha had ordered his men to hold their fire until the British tried to cross the river, but Hart's brigade, jammed into the loop of the river, was too good a target to ignore. The Boers opened fire; Hart's brigade suffered over 500 casualties before they could be extricated. The battalions repeatedly tried to extend to the left and locate the Bridle Drift; on each occasion, Hart recalled them and sent them back into the loop. Hart had given Parsons no orders and Parson's supporting fire was ineffective, even hitting some of Hart's troops.

Meanwhile, as Hildyard moved towards Colenso, the two batteries of field guns under Colonel Charles James Long forged ahead of him, and deployed in the open well within rifle range of the nearest Boers. Once again, this was too tempting a target, and the Boers opened fire. The British gunners fought on, despite suffering heavy casualties, but ammunition could not be brought to them and they were eventually forced to take shelter in a donga (dry stream bed) behind the guns. The bullock-drawn naval guns had not been able to keep up with the field pieces, but were able to come into action 1,500 metres (1,640 yd) from the Boer trenches.

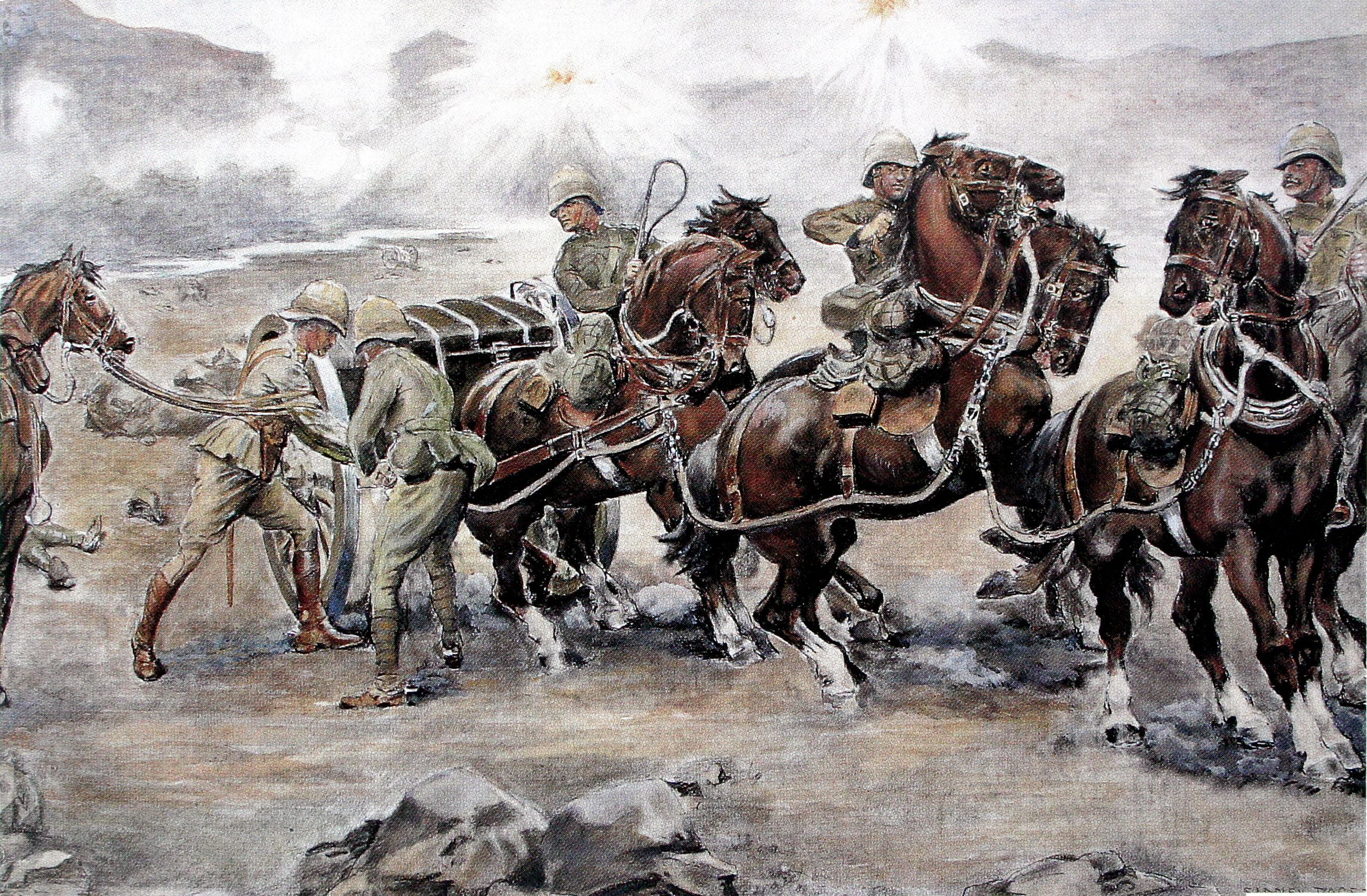
"Saving the guns at Colenso"

Buller, who had also heard that his light horse units were pinned down at the foot of Hlangwane and unable to advance, asserted command and took direct control of the battle from Clery. Buller decided to call the battle off at this point, even though Hildyard's men, advancing in open order, had just occupied Colenso. He went forward (being slightly wounded himself) and called for volunteers to recover Long's guns. Two teams approached them, hooked up and brought away two weapons. A second attempt to recover the rest of guns failed when horses and volunteers were shot down by Boer rifle fire.

During the afternoon, the British fell back to their camp, leaving ten guns, many wounded gunners and some of Hildyard's men behind to be captured during the night. Although Buller had committed few of his reserves, he reasoned that a full day under a boiling sun would have sapped their morale and strength. Lyttelton committed some of his troops to help Hart's brigade withdraw, but the cautious Major General Barton refused to support Dundonald's or Hildyard's hard-pressed troops.

The British lost 143 killed, 756 wounded, and 220 captured. Boer casualties were eight killed and 30 wounded.

== Aftermath ==
A week after the battle Buller was replaced as Commander-in-Chief in South Africa by Field Marshal Lord Roberts; however he remained in command in Natal. The brigades were dispersed into new divisional commands, and the 2nd Division reduced to two brigades. Over the next month, Buller made his original intended flank march to Potgieter's Drift, but this ended with the disastrous Battle of Spion Kop, and he then failed again at the Battle of Vaal Krantz. Eventually he returned to Colenso, and forced his way over the Tugela in the Battle of the Tugela Heights by laboriously outflanking and capturing Hlangwane, which dominated the Boer left. Even so, another ten days' fighting were necessary, but eventually Botha's forces were broken and forced to retreat, temporarily demoralised. Ladysmith was relieved on 28 February 1900.

After the battle of Colenso, four soldiers were awarded the Victoria Cross, the highest decoration for gallantry that can be awarded to British (and Commonwealth) forces. All crossed an exposed area of intense Boer fire and rescued two of the twelve guns of the 14th and 66th Batteries when their crews had become casualties or were driven from their weapons. They were Captain Walter Congreve, Captain Harry Norton Schofield, Corporal George Nurse, and Lieutenant Frederick Roberts (the only son of Field Marshal Lord Roberts), who died of his wounds two days later.
