= Downes, Crediton =

Country house in Devon, England

Coordinates: 50.7860°N 3.6306°W

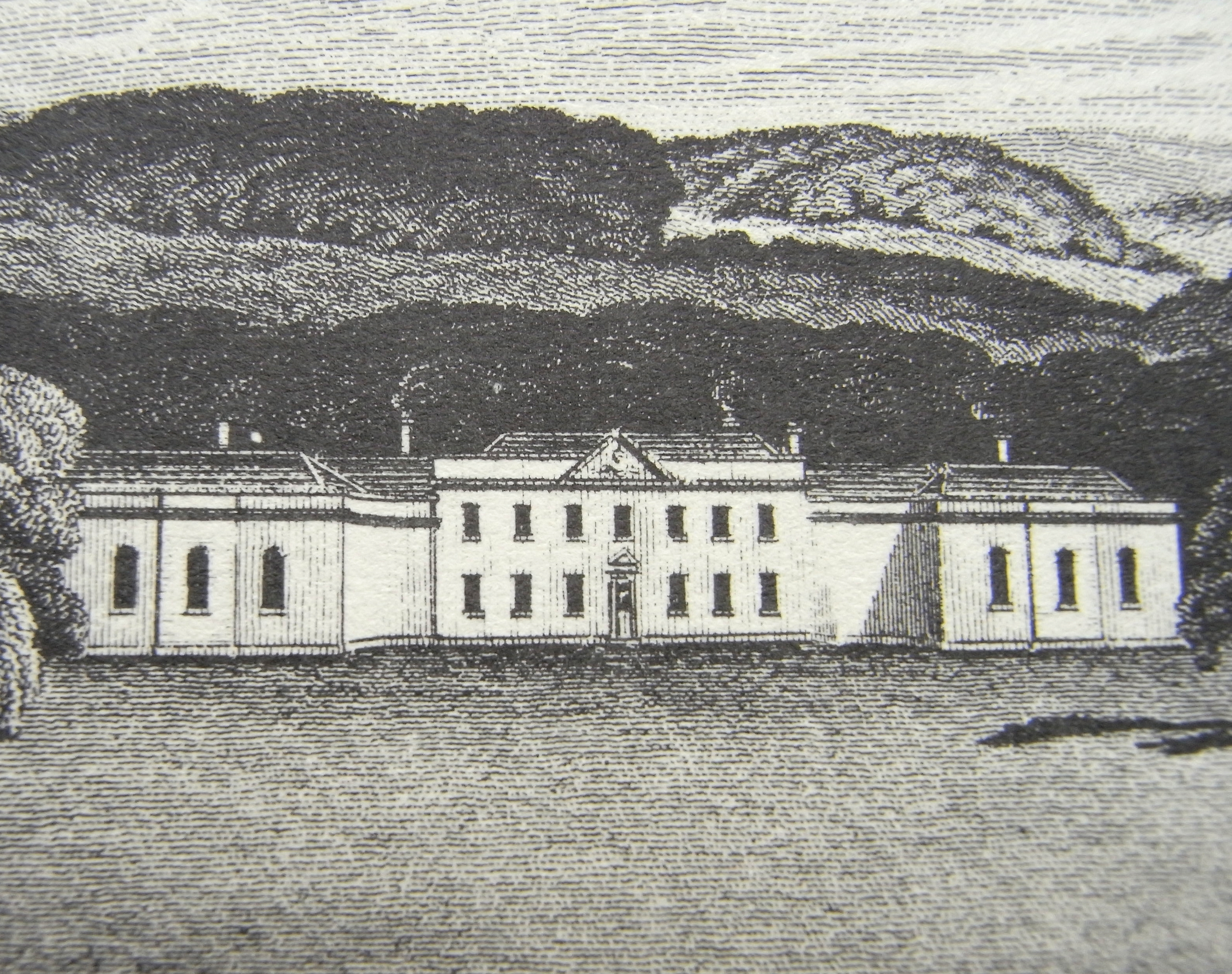
Downes House, near Crediton, detail from drawing & engraving by T Bonner, published by Richard Polwhele (1760–1838)

Downes House is a country house situated about one mile east of Crediton in Devon, England. The house is an 18th-century Palladian re-modelling of an earlier house. It was classed Grade II* listed on 20 May 1985. Nearby is the site of a Roman villa, revealed by crop-marks as a rectangular enclosure containing a winged-corridor structure. In 2012 the estate comprised 1400 acres, including the Home Farm (419 acres), Fordton Barton (203 acres), Uton Barton (327 acres), Dunscombe Farm (246 acres) and other land 110 acres and parkland.

== History ==
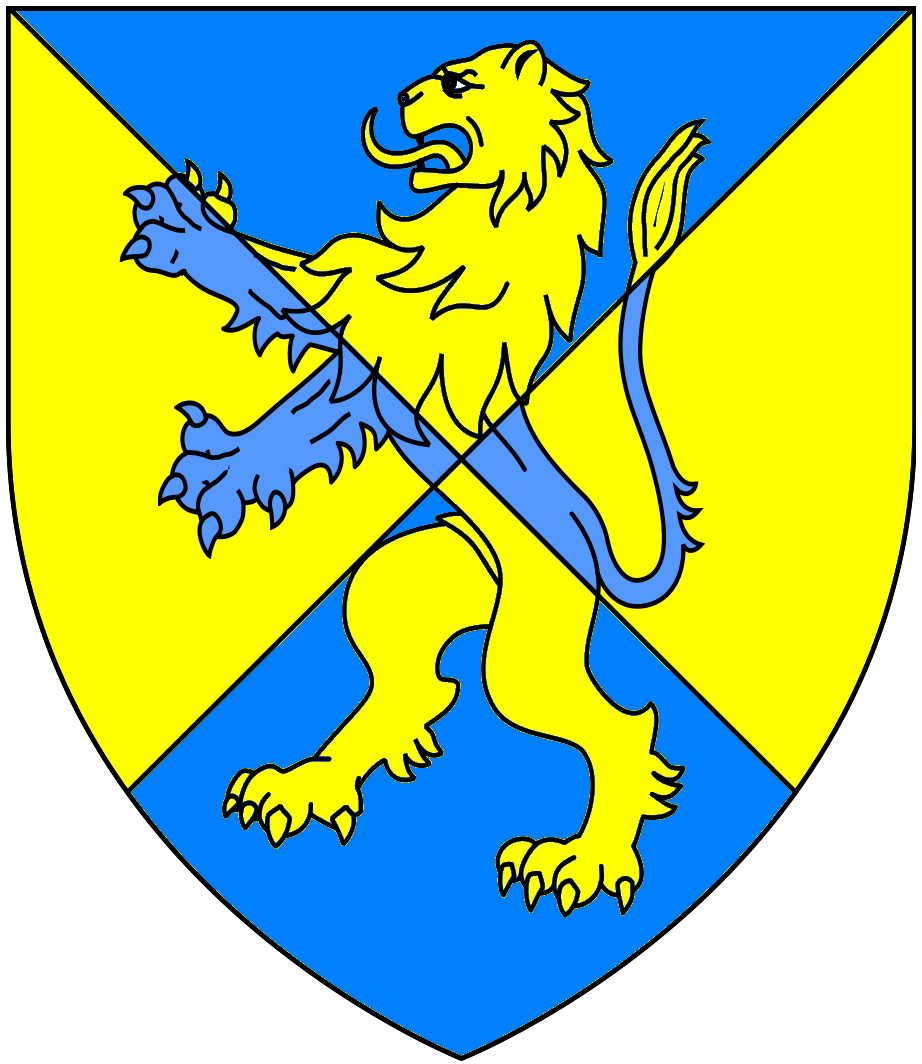
Arms of Gould: Per saltire azure and or a lion rampant counterchanged

=== Gould ===
The estate of Downes was purchased in 1692 by Moses Gould (1668–1703), eldest son and heir of William Gould (1640–1671) of Hayes (i.e. Floyer Hayes in the parish of St Thomas, Exeter) and Dunscombe, MP for Dartmouth in 1671. Moses married twice, firstly in 1690 to Anne Prust (died 1691), daughter and heiress of Mr Prust of Rawley. The marriage was childless. Secondly Moses married Susanna Kelland, daughter and co-heiress of John Kelland of Painsford, MP for Totnes. His eldest son and heir was William Gould (1697–1726), of Downes, who married Elizabeth Quicke, daughter of Andrew Quicke of Newton St Cyres. William and Elizabeth left two daughters as co-heiresses:

- Elizabeth Gould (1718–1742), who married James Buller (1717–1765), of Morval, Cornwall, and of Shillingham, MP for East Looe in Cornwall in 1741 and for Cornwall 1748–1765.
- Frances Gould (born 1722), who married in 1741 John Tuckfield (1719–1767) of Little Fulford, MP for Exeter 1747-1767 The marriage was childless, leaving the Buller family sole heirs of the Gould estates.

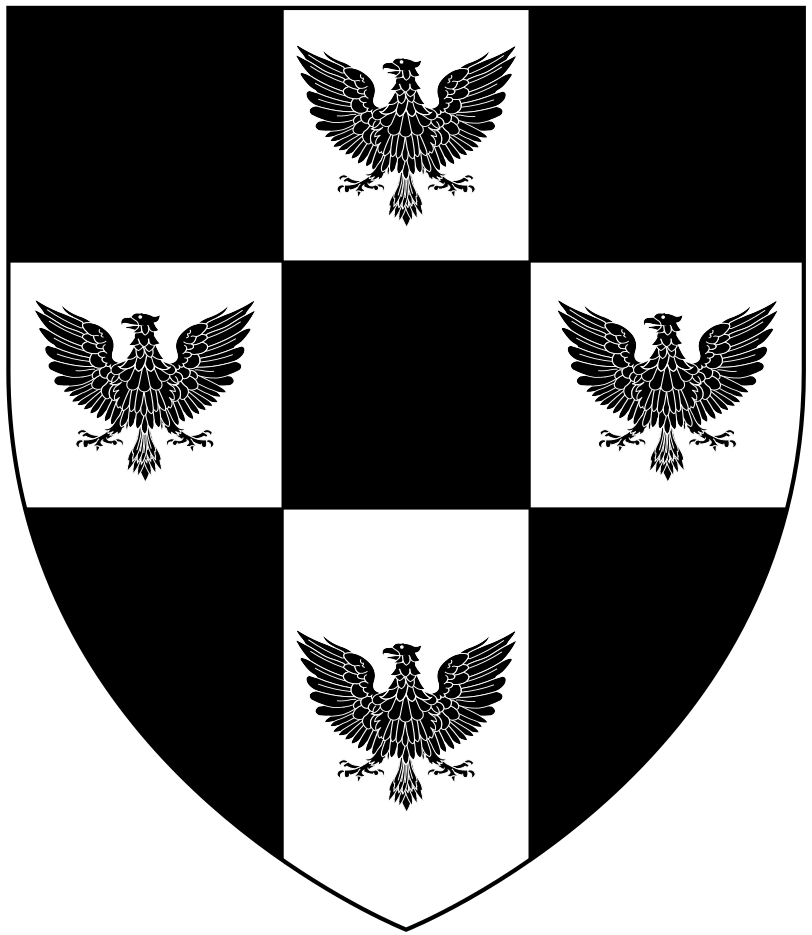
Arms of Buller: Sable, on a cross argent quarter pierced of the field four eagles displayed of the first

=== Buller ===
The ancient family of Buller is descended from Ralph Buller of Word in Somerset, sixth in descent from whom was Richard Buller who settled in Cornwall and married the heiress of Tregarrick. The estate of Morval was inherited by John Buller (1632–1716), MP, of Shillingham near Saltash, in Cornwall, from his wife Anne Coode, the daughter and sole heiress of John Coode of Morval. The descent of Downes in the Buller family was as follows:

- James Buller (1717–1765) who married as his first wife Elizabeth Gould, daughter and eventual sole heiress of William Gould (1697–1726), of Downes. He married, secondly in 1744, to Hon. Jane Bathurst (died 1794), second daughter of Allen Bathurst, 1st Earl Bathurst, and sister of the Lord Chancellor, Henry Bathurst, 2nd Earl Bathurst. James built for her a new house at King's Nympton.
- James Buller (1740–1772), son and heir of James Buller by Elizabeth Gould. He married Husey Gould, daughter of Thomas Gould of Frome.

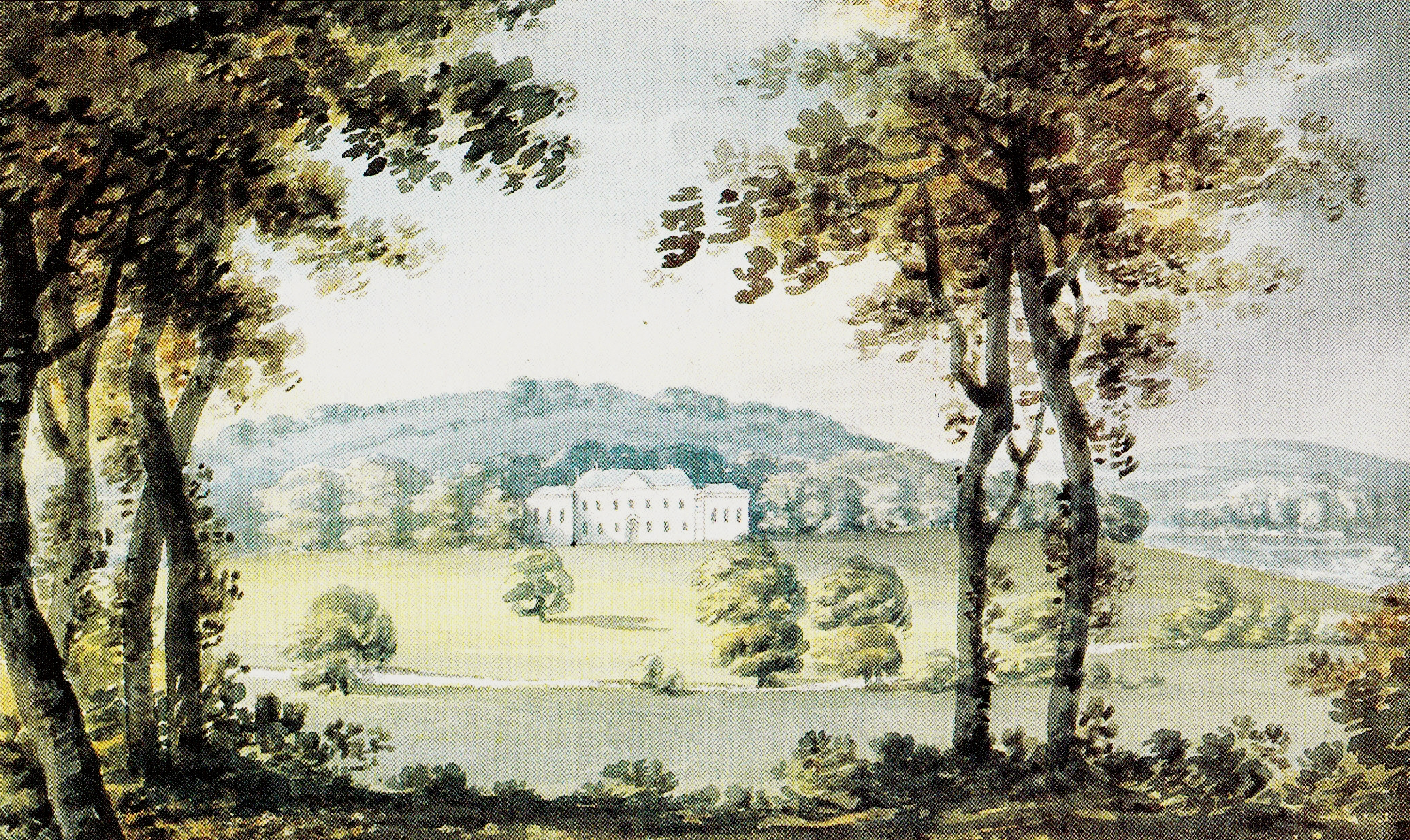
"Downes, seat of James Buller Esq", watercolour by Rev. John Swete (1752–1821) dated 1797

- James Buller (1766–1827) MP, son and heir, who in 1791 married his cousin Anne Buller (died 1851), daughter of William Buller, Bishop of Exeter.
- James Wentworth Buller (1798–1865) (son), MP for Exeter (1830–1835) and for North Devon (1857–1865). He sold King's Nympton Park in 1842 to the Tanner family. In 1831 he married Charlotte Juliana Jane Howard-Molyneux-Howard, daughter of Lord Henry Thomas Howard-Molyneux-Howard.
- James Howard Buller (1835–1874), eldest son and heir, died unmarried.
- Sir Redvers Henry Buller (1839–1908), brother and heir. In 1882 he married Audrey Townshend, daughter of John Townshend, 4th Marquess Townshend, and left a daughter, Dame Audrey Charlotte Georgiana (born 1883), DBE. As of 2015, part of Downes House was laid out as a museum to Redvers Buller, open to the public at limited times.
- Arthur Tremayne Buller (1850–1917) (brother). He married Elinor Louisa Leyborne-Popham, daughter of Francis Leyborne-Popham. His younger son was the cricketer Eric Tremayne Buller.
- Mowbray Louis Buller (born 1892), MC, (eldest son) Major, King's Royal Rifle Corps, lord of the manor of Crediton. He married Silvia Katharine Watney, daughter of Vernon James Watney of Cornbury Park, Oxfordshire, MP, son of James Watney, a partner in the family brewing firm Watney Combe & Reid. By his wife he had four daughters:
  - Susan Rosemary Buller (born 1924), eldest daughter and heiress of Downes.
  - Anne Gabrielle Buller (born 1925)
  - Ruth Silvia Buller (born 1927, twin)
  - Helen Marjorie Buller (born 1927, twin)

=== Parker ===
- Susan Rosemary Buller (1924–1997), eldest daughter and heiress of Downes, married Major Peter Henry Parker (1918–2011), son of Hon. Henry Parker (1860–1952), Sub-Librarian of the House of Lords, 10th son of Thomas Augustus Wolstenholme Parker, 6th Earl of Macclesfield of Shirburn Castle, Oxfordshire.
- Henry Mowbray Parker (born 1957), son and heir, who on 10 September 1991 married Susan Jane Alvin, daughter of John William Alvin, by whom he had children:
  - Redvers Charles Parker (born 28 Jun 1992)
  - Stroma Anne Parker (born 8 Mar 1995)
