= 6th Infantry Brigade (United Kingdom) =

Combat formation of the British Army

6th Brigade 6th Infantry Brigade
- Post Second World War badge of 6th Infantry Brigade
- Active: 1908-1918; 1923-1926; 1939-1945; 1947-1977; 1981-1992
- Country: United Kingdom
- Branch: British Army
- Type: Infantry
- Role: Infantry Brigade
- Size: Brigade
- Garrison/HQ: San Sebastian Barracks, Soest
- Engagements: Second Boer War; First World War; Second World War

Commanders
- Notable commanders: William Bartholomew

The 6th Infantry Brigade was a regular infantry brigade of the British Army that was in existence during the Second Boer War, the First World War and the Second World War and later formed part of British Army of the Rhine.

== History ==
=== Second Boer War ===
The brigade was a part of the Natal Field Force under the command of Major General Sir Geoffrey Barton. It was composed as follows;

- 2nd Battalion, Royal Fusiliers (4 companies)
- 2nd Battalion, Royal Scots Fusiliers
- 1st Battalion, Royal Welsh Fusiliers
- 2nd Battalion, Royal Irish Fusiliers

Following the end of the Boer war in 1902 the army was restructured, and a 3rd Infantry division was established permanently at Bordon as part of the 1st Army Corps, comprising the 5th and 6th Infantry Brigades.

=== First World War ===
The brigade was part of 2nd Division. The brigade commanded the following units in the First World War:

- 1st Battalion, King's (Liverpool Regiment)
- 2nd Battalion, South Staffordshire Regiment
- 13th (Service) Battalion (West Ham), Essex Regiment
- 17th (Service) Battalion, Middlesex Regiment, (the Football Battalion).
- 1st Battalion, King's Royal Rifle Corps (to 99th Bde. December 1915)

The following battalions were part of the brigade during 1915.

- 1st Battalion, Royal Berkshire Regiment (August 1914 to December 1915)
- 1/5th Battalion, King's (Liverpool Regiment) (February 1915 to December 1915)
- 1/7th Battalion, King's (Liverpool Regiment) (March 1915 to September 1915)
- 1/1st Battalion, Hertfordshire Regiment (August 1915 to June 1916)

17th (Service) Battalion, Royal Fusiliers (Empire) joined the brigade from the 5th Brigade in February 1918.

== Second World War ==
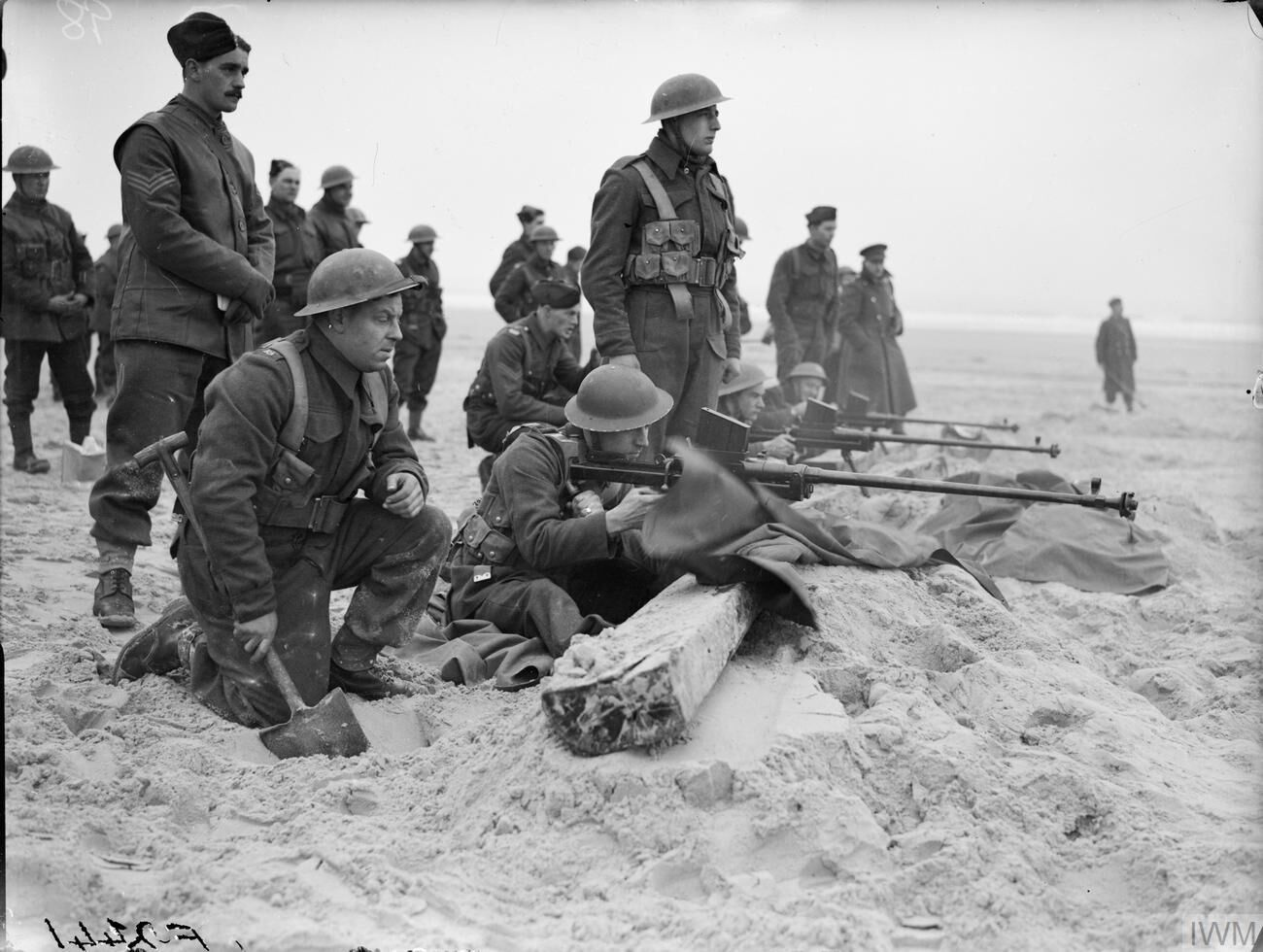
Men of the 1st Battalion, Royal Welch Fusiliers practise firing their Boys anti-tank rifles on the beach near Etaples, France, 6 February 1940.

At the outbreak of the Second World War, in September 1939, the 6th Infantry Brigade was part of the 2nd Infantry Division. In October, the brigade, under the command of Brigadier Noel Irwin, moved with the rest of the division to France to become part of the British Expeditionary Force (BEF). The brigade was involved in the short Battle of France fighting at the Battles of The Dyle, St Omer-La Bassée and the retreat to and evacuation from Dunkirk in May–June 1940. With the invasion of Burma by the Imperial Japanese Army in early 1942 the brigade was shipped out to India with the 2nd Division where it would remain for the rest of the war, fighting in the Burma Campaign. It fought in the Arakan and at Kohima and Mandalay.

=== Order of battle ===
The brigade was composed as follows;

- 1st Battalion, Royal Berkshire Regiment (9 September 1939 - 31 August 1945)
- 1st Battalion, Royal Welch Fusiliers (9 September 1939 - 31 August 1945)
- 2nd Battalion, Durham Light Infantry (3 September 1939 - 9 September 1941, 19 October 1941 - 31 August 1945)
- 1st Battalion, East Lancashire Regiment (9 September 1941 - 19 October 1941)
- 6th Infantry Brigade Anti-Tank Company (9 September 1939 - 14 December 1940)

While an Independent Brigade Group fighting in the Arakan between 1 November 1942 and 2 June 1943, the following additional units were attached:

- 1st Battalion, Royal Scots
- 99th (Buckinghamshire Yeomanry) Field Regiment, Royal Artillery
- 506th Field Company Royal Engineers
- 6th Field Ambulance Royal Army Medical Corps

=== Post-war ===
The brigade was reformed from 153rd Infantry Brigade in 1947 and then formed part of British Army of the Rhine being based at St Sebastian Barracks in Soest in 1952.

During the 1970s, the 6th Armoured Brigade was one of two "square" brigades assigned to 3rd Armoured Division. After being briefly converted to "Task Force Foxtrot" in the late 1970s, the brigade was reinstated in 1981, assigned to 3rd Armoured Division and was then reformed as an airmobile brigade at Salamanca Barracks in Soest from 1986 to 1988 and then reformed again as an armoured brigade from 1988 to 1992.

== Commanders ==
- Brigadier-General Richard Hutton Davies (October 1910 – 23 September 1914)
- Brigadier-General Robert Fanshawe (23 September – 26 December 1914)
- Lieutenant-Colonel Charles Davidson (acting 26 December 1914 – 1 January 1915)
- Brigadier-General Robert Fanshawe (1 January – 30 May 1915)
- Brigadier-General Arthur Daly (30 May 1915 – 21 January 1917)
- Brigadier-General R. K. Walsh (21 January 1917 – 28 April 1918)
- Brigadier-General Arthur Hart-Synot (28 April – 11 May 1918)
- Brigadier-General Frank Willan (12 May 1918 –)
