= Commander-in-Chief of British Forces in South Africa =

Commander of the British forces in the Second Boer War

The Commander-in-Chief of British Forces in South Africa was the title of the British Army general who held command of British forces during the Second Boer War.

The Commanders-in-Chief were:

No.	Portrait	Commander-in-Chief	Took office	Left office	Time in office	Defence branch	Ref.
1	Sir Redvers Buller	General; Sir Redvers Buller (1839–1908) (Note: Relieved during Black Week.)	11 October 1899	22 December 1899	72 days	British Army	–
2	Frederick Roberts, 1st Earl Roberts	Field Marshal; Frederick Roberts, 1st Earl Roberts (1832–1914)	23 December 1899	11 December 1900	353 days	British Army	
3	Herbert Kitchener, 1st Earl Kitchener	Field Marshal; Herbert Kitchener, 1st Earl Kitchener (1850–1916)	12 December 1900	23 June 1902	1 year, 193 days	British Army	
