= Relief of Ladysmith =

1899 battle of the Second Boer War

- Part of Second Boer War
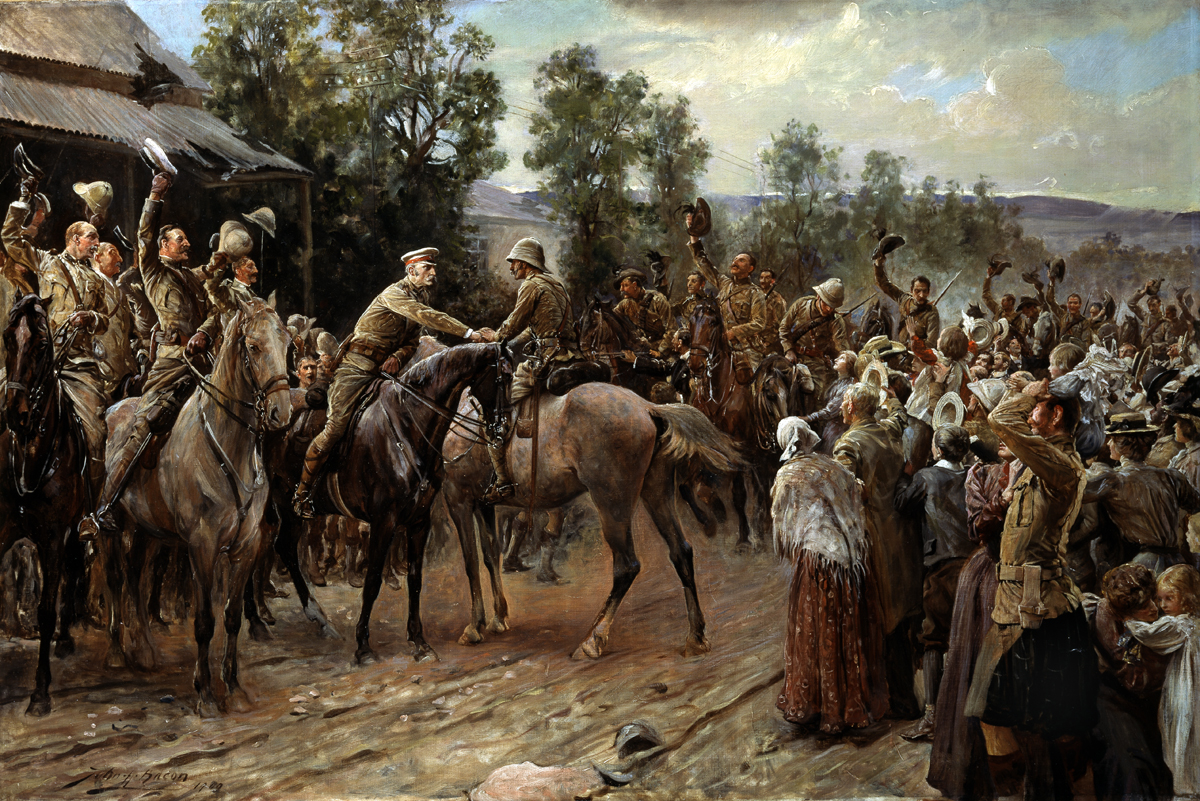
- Major Hubert Gough of the relieving force greets General Sir George White in Ladysmith, as portrayed in a painting by John Henry Frederick Bacon.
Date	15 December 1899 – 27 February 1900 (2 months and 4 days)
Location	KwaZulu-Natal, South Africa
Result	British victory

Belligerents
United Kingdom	(South African Republic) South Africa; Orange Free State

Commanders and leaders
(United Kingdom) Redvers Buller	(South African Republic) Piet Joubert (South African Republic) Louis Botha

The Relief of Ladysmith consisted of multiple efforts to relieve the city of Ladysmith by General Sir Redvers Buller during the Second Boer War. Buller and the Natal Field Force attempted to relieve the city through multiple offensive actions. The city had been under siege since 2 November 1899, and Britain had sent General Buller to relieve the city. After consolidating his Forces at Estcourt through most of November and early December, he began his relief of the city. The attempts to relieve the city started on 15 December at the Second Battle of Colenso, in which the British forces were repelled by the Boers on the Tugela River. The next two attempts were repulsed by the Boers (Spion Kop and Vaal Krantz), however at the Battle of Pieters Hill in February 1900, the Boers were eventually beaten from the city and forced to withdraw to Botha's Pass near Newcastle. Buller and his Forces entered the city on 28 February 1900, officially ending the Siege of Ladysmith.

== Geography of the area ==
The Colony of Natal was bisected from east to west by the Tugela River which rose in the Drakensberg (to the west) and flowed into the Indian Ocean to the east. The colony was bisected from north to south by the railway line that linked Durban and Johannesburg, completed in 1895). The railway line crossed the river at Colenso. Downstream from Colenso the Tugela entered a gorge, while upstream from Colenso the hills that overlooked the river continued on the northern bank of the river only – the southern bank was a relatively flat plain many kilometres wide.

Ladysmith lies on the Durban–Johannesburg railway line in a hollow on the Klip River some 20 km north of Colenso (as the crow flies).

== The early campaign ==
When the Second Boer War broke out the Boer forces had 21,000 men under the command of General Piet Joubert ready to invade the Colony of Natal. Ranged against them, the British had 13,000 men under the command of Lieutenant General Sir George White.

The Boers crossed the border into the Colony and after the Battle of Talana Hill, and the Elandalaagte and the surrender of a large number of British troops at Nicholsons Nek, White set about defending his position at Ladysmith, some 20 km north of the Tugela river. Winston Churchill asserts that the British Government plan, to which he became privy in later life, was for White to fall back to a position south of the Tugela River.

After the ensuing Battle of Ladysmith on 30 October, the Boers succeeding in entrapping White and some 8,000 British regulars in Ladysmith. The remaining British forces withdrew south of the Tugela and Estcourt, 30 km south of Colenso effectively became the British front and Joubert, in spite of advice to the contrary from Botha failed to push home his advantage and take the port city of Durban.

== Crossing the Tugela ==
On the day that the encirclement of Ladysmith was completed, reinforcements headed by General Sir Redvers Buller arrived in Cape Town en route to Natal. Buller remained in Cape Town for three weeks before pressing on to Pietermaritzburg.

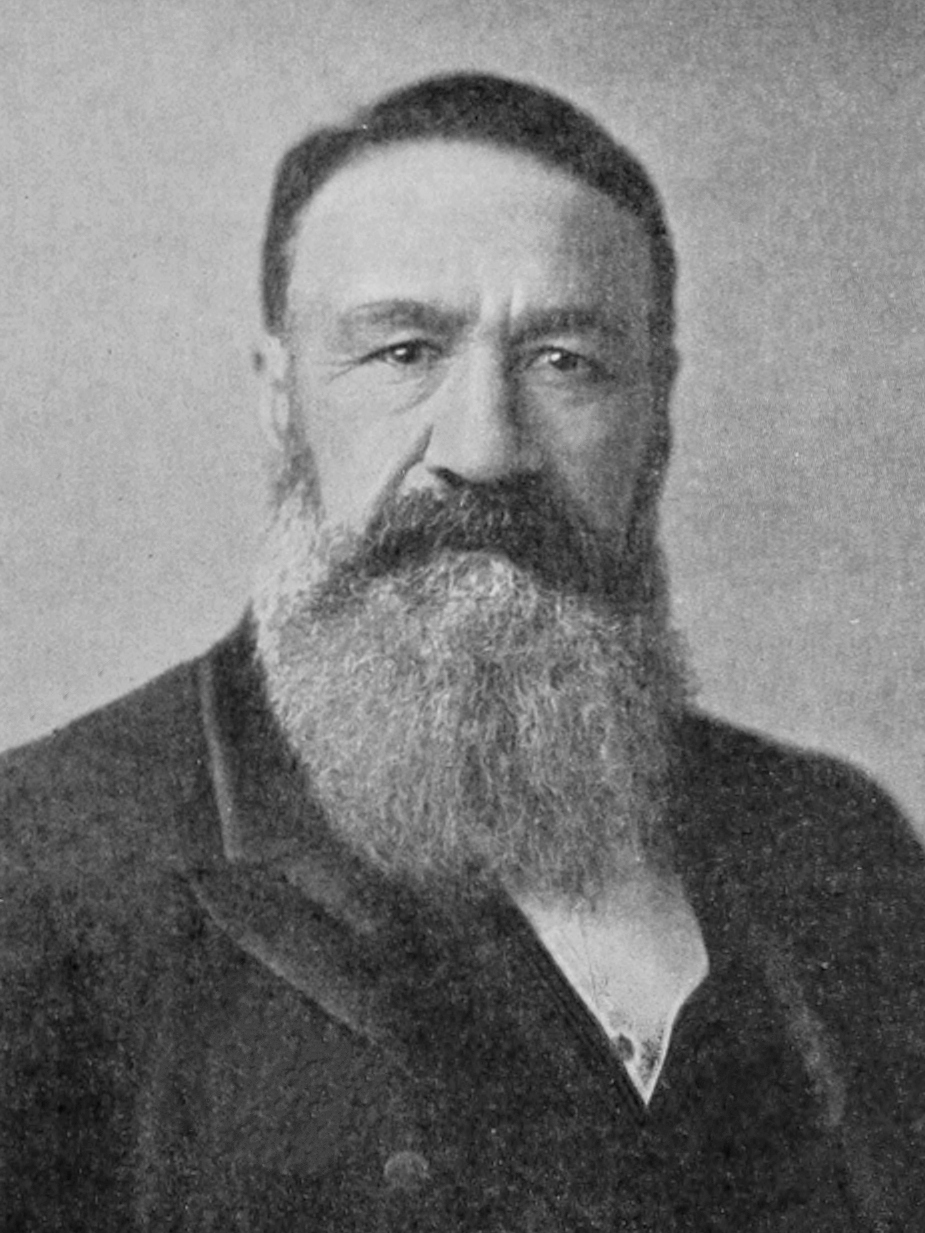
Piet Joubert, the Boer commander

On 15 November a raiding party ambushed an armoured train at Chieveley, 11 km south of Colenso taking 70 prisoners including Churchill. After another raiding party was surprised on 23 November at Willow Grange, 10 km to the south of Estcourt, the Boers withdrew to a position behind the Tugela River.

During these operations Joubert fell from his horse and sustained injuries from which he was to die on 28 March 1900 – four weeks after the relief of Ladysmith. He effectively relinquished control of the Boer forces to Louis Botha, but remained nominally in command of the forces until his death.

=== The Second Battle of Colenso (15 December 1899) ===
28°44′3″S 29°49′21″E By the middle of December, British and Empire troops were pouring into the Colony and Buller, now heading an army of 20,000 men moved his headquarters northwards to Frere.

Buller's first attempt at crossing the river was the Second Battle of Colenso. From the British point of view, the battle was a fiasco. On the western flank the British forces suffered considerable losses when the Irish Brigade were trapped in a loop in the river 3 km upstream from Colenso. In the centre they lost ten guns while on the eastern flank, Buller ordered his men to retreat even though the Boers had abandoned Hlangwane hill. Six Victoria Crosses were awarded for gallantry during the battle. During this battle, Freddie Roberts, son of Lord Roberts was mortally wounded.

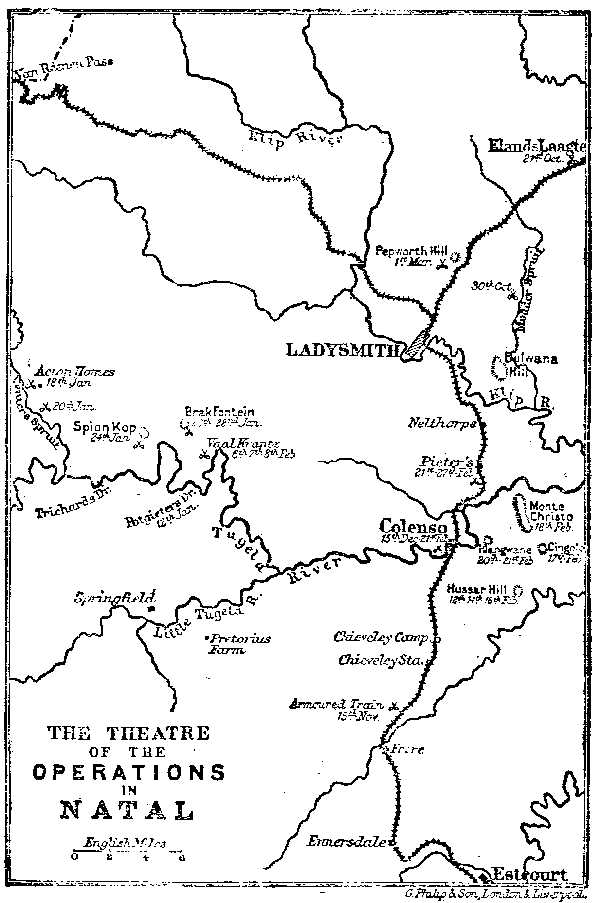
Map showing the battles in the Relief of Ladysmith

=== The Battle of Spion Kop (20–24 January 1900) ===
28°39′0″S 29°30′59″E

Reinforcements continued to pour into Natal and with the arrival of Sir Charles Warren's division, Buller had 30,000 men under his command.

Some 30 km west of Colenso, Spion Kop, a hill that rose 430 m above the plains dominated Trichardt's Drift, one of the Tugela River crossing points. Buller resolved to capture the hill and so ensure an entry to Ladysmith from the west. The main attack was entrusted to Warren and simultaneously a diversionary attack under Major General Edward Woodgate was launched at Potgieter's Drift, 4 km to the east. From their position on the hills, the Boers were able to watch the British force moving upstream on the south bank of the river and built appropriate defences. On 18 January the British built a pontoon bridge across the river and started to cross. On the night of 23 January in heavy mist the British launched an attack on what they thought was Spion Kop, but it turned out to be a smaller mound some 500 m from the main peak. The following day there was bloody fighting as the British tried to force their way to the top of the main peak. By nightfall both sides thought that the other had taken the hill, so they abandoned their positions and it was only once a Boer scout realised the situation that the Boers retook the hill and the British withdrew back across the Tugela.

=== The Battle of Vaal Krantz (5–7 February 1900) ===
28°40′S 29°37′E

British troops entering Ladysmith in February

Vaal Krantz was a ridge of kopjes (small hills) a few kilometres east of Spion Kop. Buller tried to force a bridgehead across the Tugela River. After three days of skirmishing, the British general found that his position was so cramped that there was no room to drag his superior artillery up to support the British infantry attacks. Buller called a council of war and "All his generals agreed that there was nothing for it except to try a new attempt elsewhere."

=== The Battle of the Tugela Heights (14–27 February 1900) ===
28°41′S 29°50′E

Even though the Tugela Heights are located on the north bank of the Tugela River a few kilometres downstream from Colenso, the battle itself covered the taking of a number of hills on both sides of the Tugela.

In the first phase of the engagement, the British took the hills of Monte Cristo, some five kilometres to the west of Colenso on the South Bank thereby outflanking the Boers on Hlangwane hill. The Boers, under heavy bombardment abandoned Hlangwane and withdrew north of the Tugela.

On 21 February a pontoon bridge was built which enabled the British to take Railway Hill and Wynnes Hill, but failed to capture Harts Hill and Wynnes Hill. On 25 February the British moved the pontoon bridge downstream to the mouth of the Tugela gorge where they could cross the river unseen and outflank the Boer positions. On 27 February the British took both Pieters Hill and Harts Hill, after which the Boer resistance crumbled.

== The Relief of Ladysmith (1 March 1900) and its aftermath ==
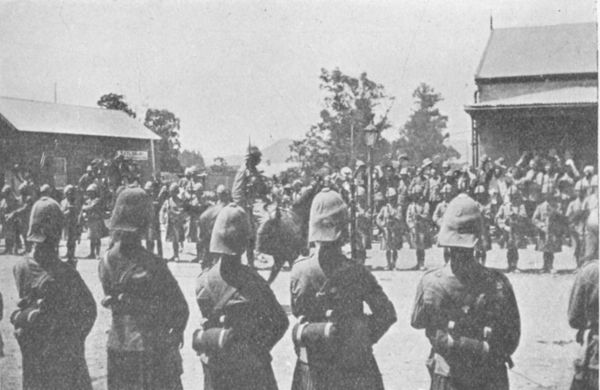
General Buller parading in Ladysmith, after the lifting of the siege.

On 28 February the Boer commanders ordered their troops to withdraw to the Biggarsberg, some 45 km to the north of Ladysmith. There was little organisation in the withdrawal, but the British forces were instructed not to go in pursuit. The British forces led by Lord Dundonald with Churchill by his side entered Ladysmith on the afternoon of 1 March 1900.

The Boers meanwhile established a line of defence along the Biggarsberg, but, apart from the odd patrol, there was little movement by either side for two months – Buller was regrouping his forces while Botha, who took over as general commander of the Boer forces after Joubert's death, handed control in Natal to Lukas Meyer. The Boer forces in Natal had meanwhile shrunk to between 4500 and 6000. In the second half of May, Buller resumed the offensive and before the end of the month had taken the North Natal towns of Dundee, Glencoe and Newcastle.

Events in Natal were soon overtaken by events elsewhere in South Africa. On 15 February, before the siege of Ladysmith had been raised, Roberts had raised the siege of Kimberley and on the day that the British broke through the Tugela Heights, General Cronjé surrendered to Lord Roberts with 4000 men at the Paardeberg. On 13 March Roberts captured Bloemfontein, the capital of the Orange Free State Republic and of 5 July 1900 he took Pretoria, the capital of the South African Republic.

Meanwhile, in Natal, Buller had yet to secure the mountain passes between the colony and the Orange Free State – an objective that he achieved on 11 June 1900, effectively ending the Natal phase of the war.
