= Battle of Vaal Krantz =

1900 battle of the Second Boer War

Battle of Vaalkraans
- Part of Second Boer War
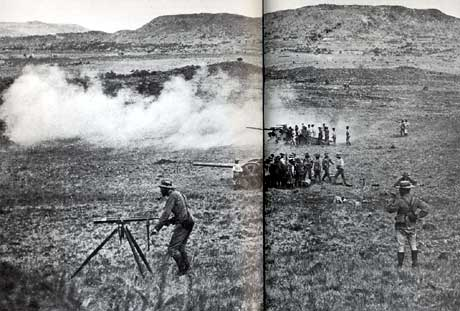
- British artillery during the Battle of Vaal Krantz
Date	5–7 February 1900
Location	South Africa 28°40′31″S 29°37′51″E
Result	Boer victory

Belligerents
United Kingdom	South African Republic; Orange Free State

Commanders and leaders
(United Kingdom) Redvers Buller	(South African Republic) Louis Botha

Strength
20,000	5,000

Casualties and losses
333 casualties	30 killed 50 wounded

The Battle of Vaal Krantz (Afrikaans: Slag van Vaalkrans, 5 - 7 February 1900) was the third failed attempt by General Redvers Buller's British army to fight its way past Louis Botha's army of Boer irregulars and lift the Siege of Ladysmith. The battle occurred during the Second Boer War.

== Background ==
In the first and second attempts at relieving Ladysmith, Buller's army was defeated by Botha and his Boer army at the battles of Colenso and Spion Kop. British casualties soared to 3,000 men, while the Boers lost only a few hundred.

== Battle ==
Vaal Krantz (Vaalkrans) is a ridge of kopjes (small hills) a few miles east of Spion Kop. Buller tried to force a bridgehead across the Tugela River with the Rifle Brigade and Durham Light Infantry (2nd Division) prominent amongst his troops. After three days of skirmishing, the British general found that his position was so cramped that there was no room to drag his superior artillery up to support the British infantry attacks. Buller called a council of war and, "All his generals agreed that there was nothing for it except to try a new attempt elsewhere." Pakenham wrote that the British suffered 333 casualties, but Symonds put the British casualties at 30 dead and 350 wounded with Boers casualties were 30 dead and 50 wounded. Vaal Krantz was a minor defeat. On 14 February with the Battle of the Tugela Heights, Buller launched his fourth attempt at the Relief of Ladysmith and finally succeeded.

== Gallery ==
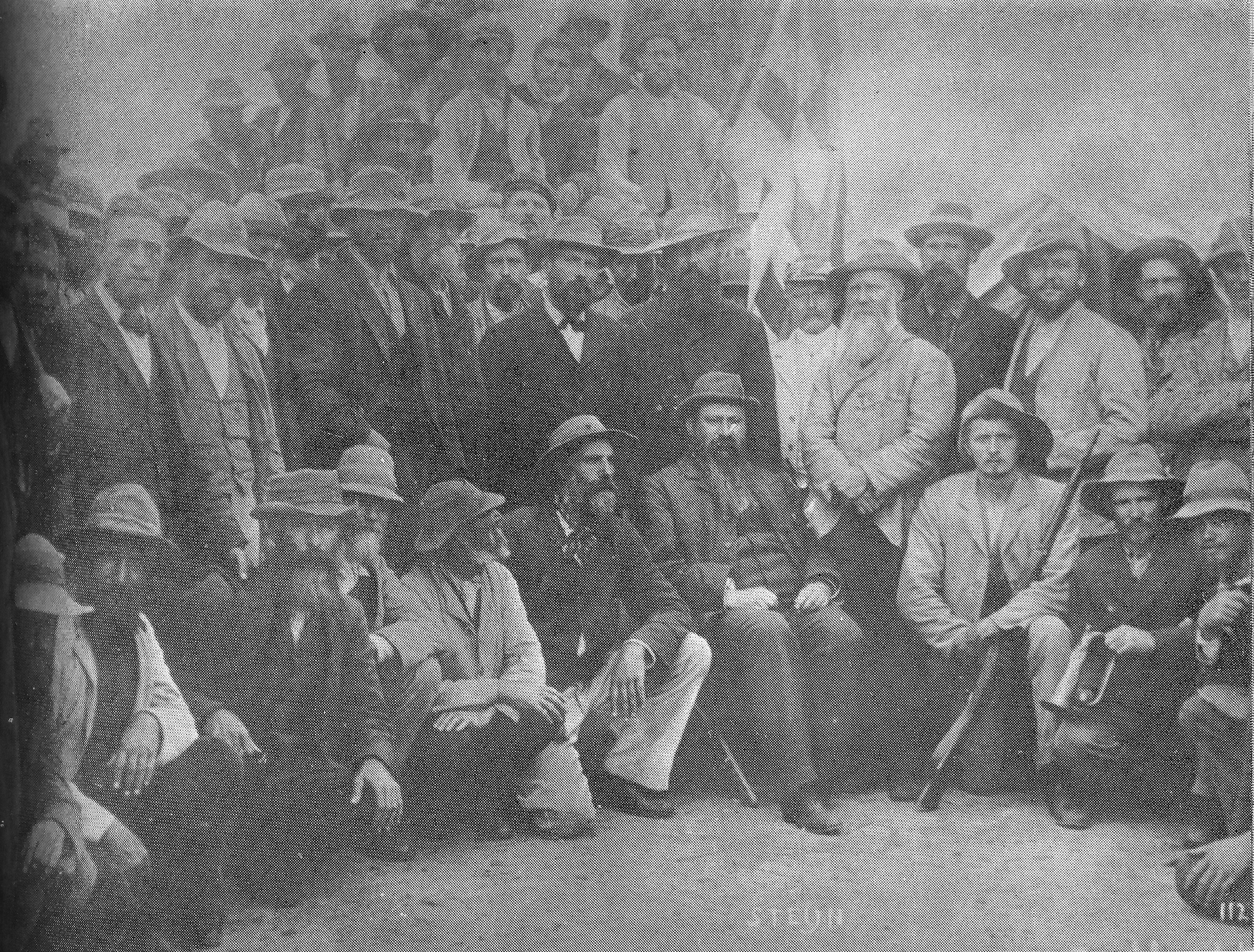
President M.T. Steyn among his citizens before the Battle of Vaalkrans, early February 1900.

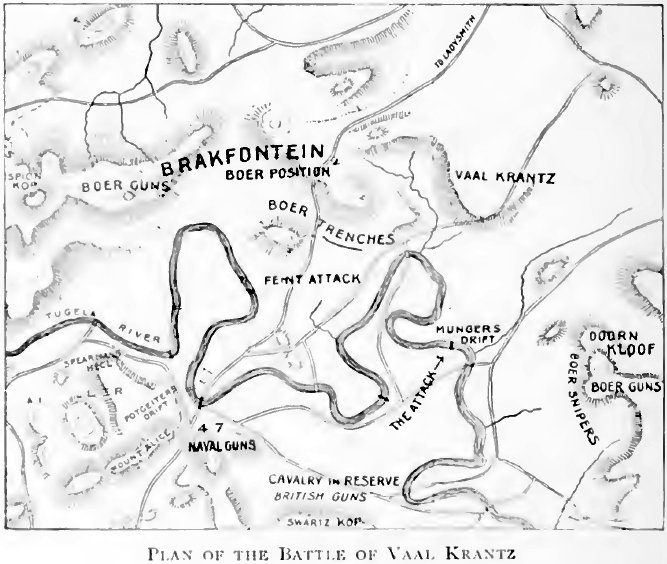
Map of the Battle of Vaal Krantz.
