= Siege of Ladysmith =

Part of the Second Boer War (1899–1900)

- Part of Second Boer War
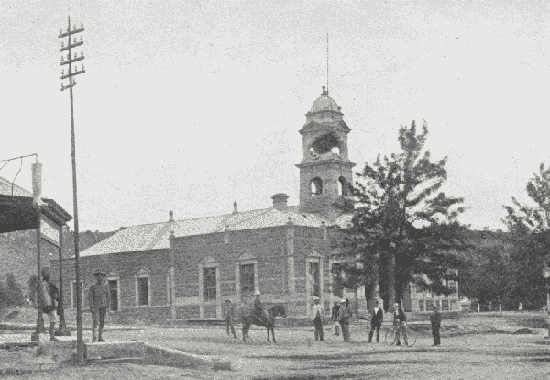
- The town hall at Ladysmith, showing shell damage to the tower
| Date | 2 November 1899 – 28 February 1900 (3 months, 3 weeks and 5 days) |
| Location | Ladysmith, Natal (present-day South Africa) 28°33′33″S 29°46′51″E |
| Result | British victory |

Belligerents
| United Kingdom | Transvaal; Orange Free State |

Commanders and leaders
| (United Kingdom of Great Britain and Ireland) George Stuart White | (South African Republic) Petrus Jacobus Joubert (South African Republic) Louis Botha (Orange Free State) Christiaan De Wet |

Strength
| 12,500 | Max 21,000 men |

Casualties and losses
| c. 850 killed and wounded 800 prisoners | 52+ killed Total casualties unknown |

The siege of Ladysmith was a protracted engagement in the Second Boer War, taking place between 2 November 1899 and 28 February 1900 at Ladysmith, Natal.

After the outbreak of war in October, Boer forces invaded neighbouring British colonies and rapidly surrounded the border towns of Ladysmith, Kimberly and Mafeking. At Ladysmith the Boer besiegers bombarded the town and fought inconclusive skirmishes with the garrison whilst attempting to halt British relief forces under General Sir Redvers Buller on the Tugela River. After a failed attempt to cross the Tugela during Black Week, the British broke through on 27 February and Ladysmith was relieved the following day, after a siege of 118 days.

== Boer invasion of Natal ==
=== Outbreak of war ===
The Second Boer War began on 11 October 1899 when the Boer republics of Transvaal and the Orange Free State (OFS), under their Presidents Paul Kruger and Martinus Theunis Steyn respectively, declared war on the British Empire. Two days previously, the republics had issued a joint ultimatum demanding the withdrawal of British troops from the northern part of Natal—which bordered OFS on the west and Transvaal on the east—and the recall of all reinforcements dispatched to Natal in recent weeks.

The British government ignored the ultimatum, which they are held to have provoked. They claimed to be protecting the interests of its own citizens who lived in Transvaal. Kruger's Afrikaner government refused to extend the franchise to Uitlanders ("foreigners"), who potentially outnumbered the resident Afrikaner/Boer population. The Boer republics, insisting that Britain sought to incorporate them into a united South Africa under imperial rule, were determined to remain independent. It was widely believed that Britain's real motive was to gain control of the recently discovered Witwatersrand gold mines near Johannesburg.

The catalyst for the Boer ultimatum was the mobilisation of some 4,000 British troops in northern Natal under the command of General Sir William Penn Symons. That followed the decision to reinforce the whole of Natal with 10,000 extra troops drawn from various regiments and battalions in India, Egypt, Malta, and Crete. There were delays in organising this force, and it was not until mid-October that all men and equipment had disembarked at Durban. Their ultimatum having expired, the Boers under General Piet Joubert began their invasion of northern Natal on 11/12 October, advancing with three columns under Generals Daniel Erasmus, Jan Kock, and Lucas Meyer.

=== Natal's "triangle" ===
The strategically important northern part of Natal had the shape of a triangle, and was often referred to as such. It was a wedge of land with a broad southern base formed by the Tugela River. The Drakensberg mountains formed its western border with the OFS. There were two eastern borders formed by the Buffalo River: Transvaal to the north-east, and Zululand south-east. The town of Newcastle was near the apex of the triangle, and close to both the OFS and Transvaal borders. Further south, where the triangle became broader, Glencoe and the nearby coal-mining town of Dundee are just north of the central Biggarsberg mountain range. Dundee is about fifteen miles west of the Buffalo. Ladysmith is some fifty miles south-west of Glencoe, with the small town of Elandslaagte roughly midway between. Apart from Dundee, these towns were all on the Zuid–Oosterlijn railway which connected Durban with Johannesburg and Pretoria, crossing the Tugela at Colenso, twelve miles south of Ladysmith.

Symons, who was then Britain's GOC in Natal, held that a relatively small force north of the Biggarsbergs was adequate to defend the southern part of the triangle. He was supported by the colony's governor, Sir Walter Hely-Hutchinson. In choosing this strategy, Symons rejected the views of General Redvers Buller, an experienced campaigner in South Africa who had returned to England. Buller was opposed to garrisons in the Natal triangle, and strongly urged the formation of a defensive line along the southern bank of the Tugela, centered on Colenso.

The first wave of British reinforcements, disembarking at Durban in October, were under the command of General Sir George White, who was to supersede Symons as Natal GOC. White's initial view, invoking Buller's advice, was that Symons should withdraw from the triangle, but he was challenged by Hely-Hutchinson, who feared political repercussions should northern Natal fall to the Boers. Symons had garrisoned Dundee with some 4,000 soldiers comprising three battalions of infantry, supported by units of the Royal Artillery, the 18th Hussars, and others. Despite his misgivings, White decided to accept the governor's political arguments and, with a force of 8,000 under his command, chose Ladysmith as his headquarters.

=== Battles of Talana Hill and Elandslaagte ===
A total of 21,000 Boers advanced into Natal from all sides. Newcastle was taken without a fight. Symons' force, stationed at Glencoe and Dundee, fought the Battle of Talana Hill on 20 October. The British won a tactical victory there, but Symons was mortally wounded and died later in Dundee. General James Yule took command.

While Talana Hill was fought, the Boers captured the railway station at Elandslaagte, severing all communication between Ladysmith and Glencoe. White responded by ordering his cavalry, under Major General John French, to clear the railway line and reconnect the telegraph. The Battle of Elandslaagte was fought on 21 October. French's cavalry were victorious but gained no strategic advantage.

=== Retreat to Ladysmith ===
Fearing an invasion of Boers from the Orange Free State, White decided to withdraw all his forces to Ladysmith. Learning of the situation at Elandslaagte, Yule decided to abandon Dundee and Glencoe on 22 October. His force retreated to the south-east by a circuitous cross-country route, and reached Ladysmith on 26 October, where they reinforced White's garrison.

Despite their setback at Elandslaagte, the Boers maintained their advance. General White ordered an attack on 24 October at Rietfontein, which is near Elandslaagte. White's concern was that the Boers would take high ground above the route of Yule's column. The British action succeeded, and Yule was able to reach Ladysmith. It has been asked if White should have tried to press home the advantage gained at Rietfontein, to impose a definite check on the Boer advance, but it is doubtful if that could have been achieved.

A few days later, on the 30th, the Boers were victorious in the Battle of Lombard's Kop, and they went on to complete their encirclement of Ladysmith. White had precipitated the engagement after underestimating the strength of the Boer force, and believed the tactics used at Talana and Elandslaagte would again succeed. The battle was a disaster for the British, who were driven back into Ladysmith having lost some 1,400 men killed, wounded, or captured.

== Siege ==
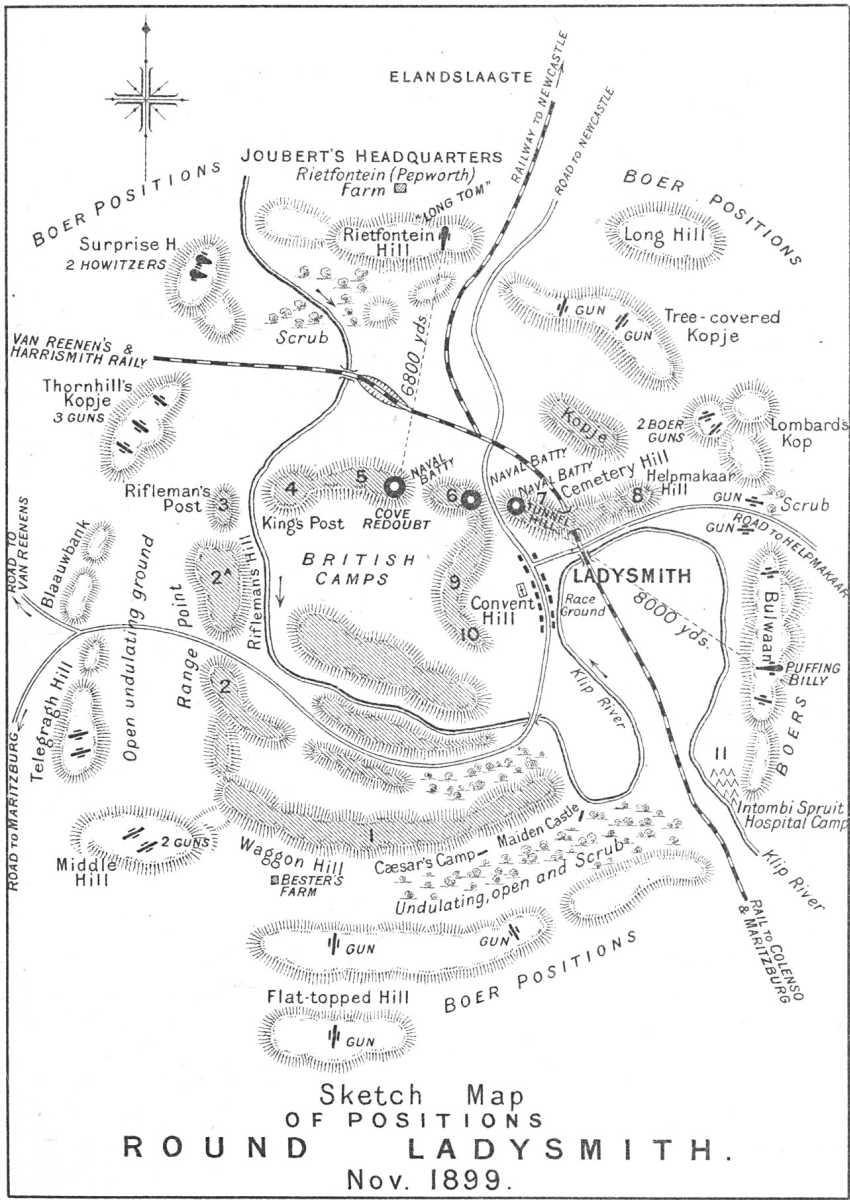
Sketch map of the positions in November 1899

The Boers then proceeded to surround Ladysmith and cut the railway link to Durban. Major General John French and his chief of staff, Major Douglas Haig escaped on the last train to leave, which was riddled with bullets.

The town was then besieged for 118 days. White knew that large reinforcements were arriving, and could communicate with British units south of the Tugela River by searchlight and heliograph. He expected relief soon. Meanwhile, his troops carried out several raids and sorties to sabotage Boer artillery.

Louis Botha commanded the Boer detachment which first raided Southern Natal, and then dug in north of the Tugela to hold off the relief force. On 15 December 1899, the first relief attempt was defeated at the Second Battle of Colenso. Temporarily unnerved, the relief force commander, General Redvers Buller, suggested that White either break out, or surrender after destroying his stores and ammunition. White could not break out because his horses and draught animals were weak from lack of grazing and forage, and he refused to surrender.

== Battle of Wagon Hill (or Platrand) ==
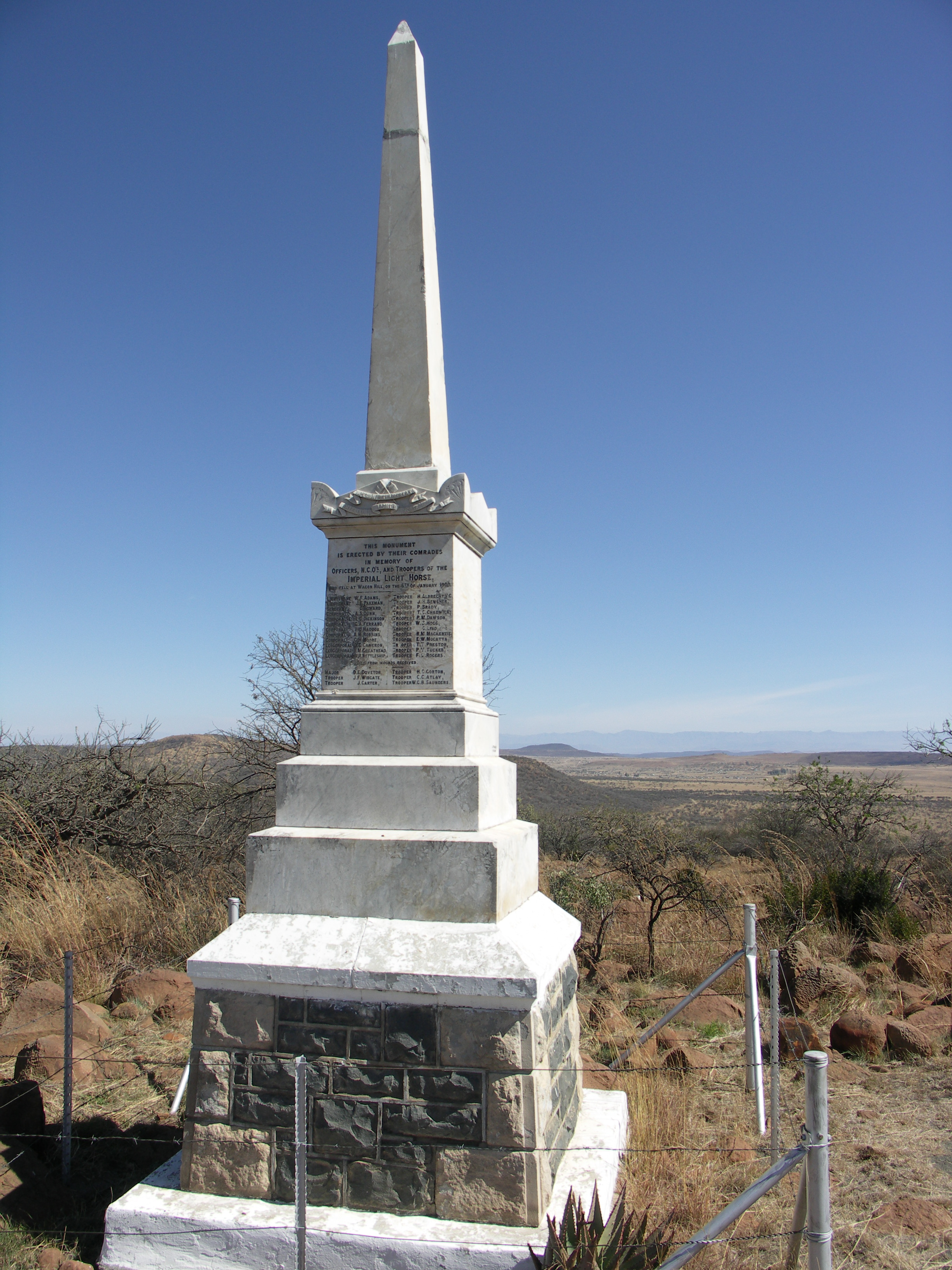
Imperial Light Horse Memorial on Platrand Ladysmith (28°35′28″S 29°45′33″E) – at the location of the Battle of Wagon Hill in which 30 men from the regiment died and whose names are engraved on the monument.

The Boers around Ladysmith were also growing weak from lack of forage. With little action, many fighters took unauthorised leave or brought their families into the siege encampments. Eventually, with the Tugela in flood, preventing Buller from giving any support, some younger Boer leaders persuaded General Piet Joubert to order a storming attempt on the night of 5 January 1900, before another relief attempt could be made.

The British line south of Ladysmith ran along a ridge known as the Platrand. The occupying British troops had named its features Wagon Hill to the west, and Caesar's Camp (after features near Aldershot, well known to much of the British army) to the east. Under Colonel Ian Hamilton, they had constructed a line of forts, sangars and entrenchments on the reverse slope of the Platrand, of which the Boers were unaware.

In the early hours of 6 January 1900, Boer storming parties under General C. J. de Villiers began climbing Wagon Hill and Caesar's Camp. They were spotted and engaged by British working parties who were emplacing some guns. The Boers captured the edge of Wagon Hill, but could not advance further. Half an hour later, they also captured part of the Caesar's Camp position, but again could not advance beyond the forward edge of the hill. British counter-attacks also failed.

At noon, de Villiers made another attack on Wagon Hill. Some of the exhausted defenders panicked and fled, but Hamilton led reserves to the spot and recaptured some empty gun pits. Although Hamilton suggested that the Boers would withdraw at night, Sir George White demanded that fresh reserves were to retake the entire position immediately. The Devonshire Regiment suffered heavy casualties but only drove the Boers back as far as the crest line, and a stalemate once again ensued.

Late in the afternoon, a terrific rainstorm broke, and the Boers withdrew under cover of it.

The British suffered 175 killed and 249 wounded. 52 dead Boers were left in the British positions, but their total casualties were not recorded.

== Later siege and relief ==
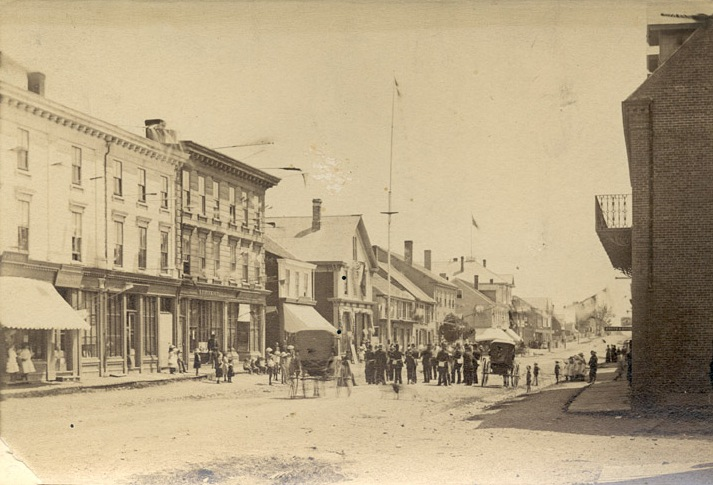
Rejoicing in St. Andrews, Canada upon receipt of the news of the relief of Ladysmith.

While Buller made repeated attempts to fight his way across the Tugela, the defenders of Ladysmith suffered increasingly from shortage of food and other supplies, and from disease, mainly enteric fever (typhoid), which claimed many lives. The Boers had long before captured Ladysmith's water supply, and the defenders could use only the muddy Klip River. Towards the end of the siege, the garrison and townsfolk were living largely on their remaining draught oxen and horses (mainly in the form of "chevril", a meat paste named after the commercial beef extract "Bovril").

Eventually, Buller broke through the Boer positions on 27 February. Following their succession of reverses, his troops had developed effective tactics based on close co-operation between the infantry and artillery. After the protracted struggle, the morale of Botha's men at last broke and they and the besiegers retreated, covered by another huge thunderstorm. Buller did not pursue, and White's men were too weak to do so.

The first party of the relief column under Major Hubert Gough, who was accompanied by war correspondent Winston Churchill, rode in on the evening of 28 February. Soon afterwards, as the townspeople celebrated, White made a speech at the town's post office to thank them for their fortitude, and reportedly said: "but, thank God, we kept the flag flying".

== Aftermath ==
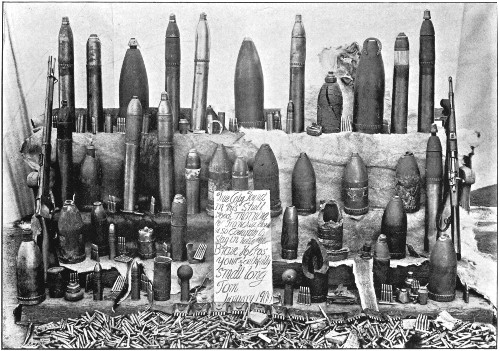
Varieties of ammunition collected at Ladysmith.

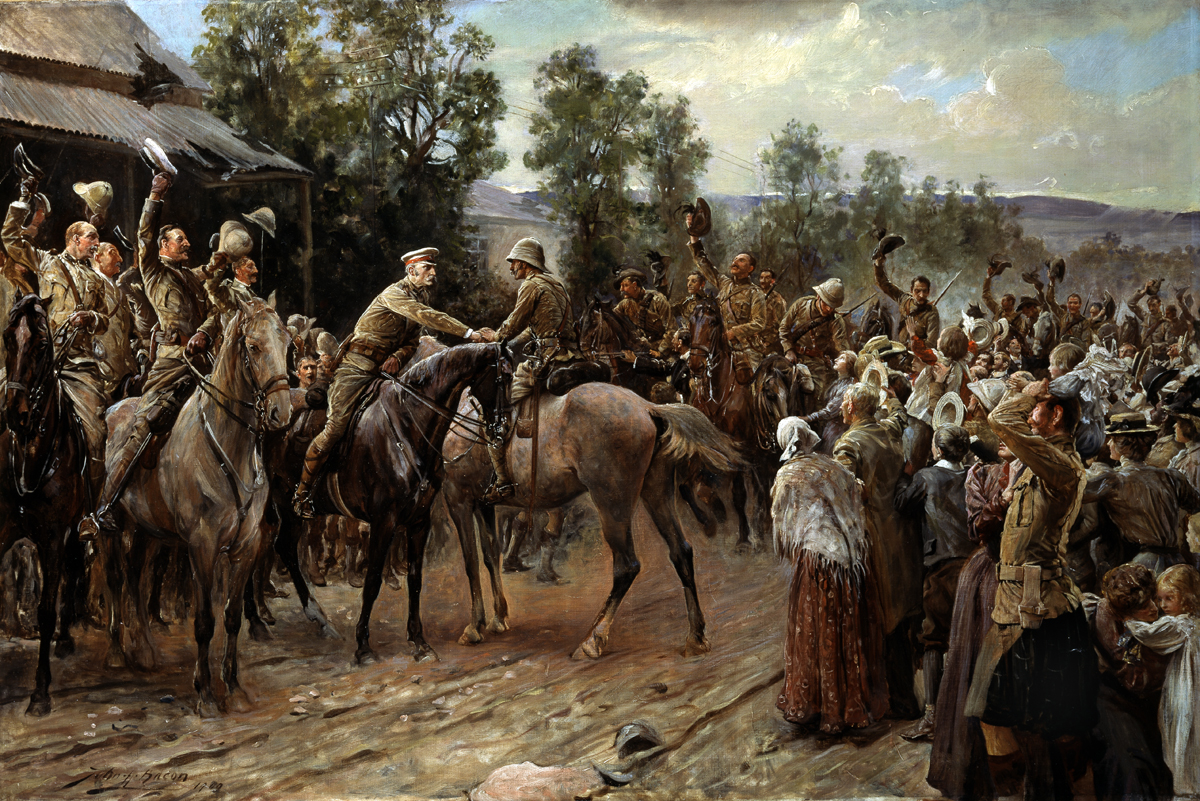
The Relief of Ladysmith. Painting by John Henry Frederick Bacon (1868–1914).

Four Victoria Crosses (two posthumous) were awarded following the siege:

- Trooper Herman Albrecht (Imperial Light Horse) and Lieutenant Robert Digby-Jones (Royal Engineers) jointly led the assault on Wagon Hill, and repelled the initial Boer attack, but both were killed in the ensuing mêlée.
- Lieutenant James Masterson (1st Battalion, Devonshire Regiment) delivered an urgent despatch despite suffering serious wounds during the Battle of Wagon Hill on 6 January 1900.
- Second Lieutenant John Norwood (5th Dragoon Guards) rescued a wounded comrade under heavy fire during a patrol on 30 October 1899.

Sir George White had no doubts about the need to hold Ladysmith, describing it as "a place of primary importance" because of its railway junction, which would have enabled the Free State and Transvaal armies to unite. Churchill commented that Ladysmith was an essential component of the Boer campaign strategy because "they scarcely reckoned on a fortnight's resistance; nor in their wildest nightmares did they conceive a four months' siege terminating in the furious inroad of a relieving army".

The British artist John Henry Frederick Bacon depicted The Relief of Ladysmith in a painting which shows people celebrating on 28 February 1900, as White shakes hands with Colonel Dundonald (representing Buller) at Pieter's Hill, just outside the town. Bacon's work became known as the Bovril War Picture after its photogravure was sponsored by the company, and offered free to anyone who collected a sufficient number of coupons from each jar of the product.

The Royal Navy's landing of two 4.7-inch (120 mm) guns from HMS Terrible and Powerful and four 12-pounder naval guns to help relieve the siege inspired the field gun competition at the Royal Tournament. The Naval Brigade had transported the improvised field guns using makeshift gun carriages over difficult terrain over the final leg of the journey, and the event it inspired became a popular item at the Royal Tournament until its end in 1999.

== Medical treatment during the siege ==
Early in the siege, an agreement between White and Joubert led to the creation of the neutral Intombi Military Hospital some 5 kilometres (3.1 mi) outside Ladysmith. It was run by Major-General David Bruce and his wife Mary. During the siege, the number of beds in the hospital camp grew from an initial 100 to over 1,900. A total of 10,673 admissions were received and treated at Intombi.

== Notable casualties during the siege ==
Arthur Stark, English author of The Birds of South Africa, was resident in the town's Royal Hotel. On the evening of 18 November 1899, when he was standing on the hotel's veranda, he was hit by shellfire from Pepworth Hill and suffered serious leg injuries. He died soon afterwards while undergoing surgery, and was buried in Ladysmith. H. W. Nevinson attended his funeral, and recorded the irony of Stark having been vociferously opposed to British war policy.

George Warrington Steevens, British author and war correspondent, died of enteric fever on 15 January 1900. He had been attached to Sir George White's force, and had sent many articles back to Britain. These were published posthumously in From Capetown to Ladysmith.

== Sources ==
- London to Ladysmith via Pretoria at Project Gutenberg. Churchill, Winston (1900). London to Ladysmith via Pretoria. Longman.
- Childs, Lewis (1999). Ladysmith: The Siege. Leo Cooper. ISBN 978-0-8505-2653-0.
- Conan Doyle, Arthur (1902). Chapter 13: The Siege Of Ladysmith. The Great Boer War. Classic Literature Library. Archived from the original on 21 June 2006 – via Public Domain Books.
- Durand, Henry Mortimer; White, George Stuart (1915). "III—Arrival in South Africa". The Life of Field-Marshal Sir George White, V.C. Vol. II. Edinburgh: Blackwood.
- Judd, Denis; Surridge, Keith (2013). The Boer War—A History. I. B. Tauris. ISBN 978-1-7807-6591-4.
- Kruger, Rayne (1964). Goodbye Dolly Gray. New English Library.
- Ladysmith, The Diary of a Siege at Project Gutenberg. Nevinson, H. W. (1900). Ladysmith—The Diary of a Siege. Methuen.
- Pakenham, Thomas (1979). The Boer War. Weidenfeld & Nicolson. ISBN 978-0-2977-7395-5.
- Four Months Besieged, The Story of Ladysmith at Project Gutenberg. Pearse, Henry H. S. (1900). Four Months Besieged: The Story of Ladysmith. Macmillan.
