= Battle of Rooihuiskraal =

Military action during the first Anglo-Boer War

- Part of the First Boer War
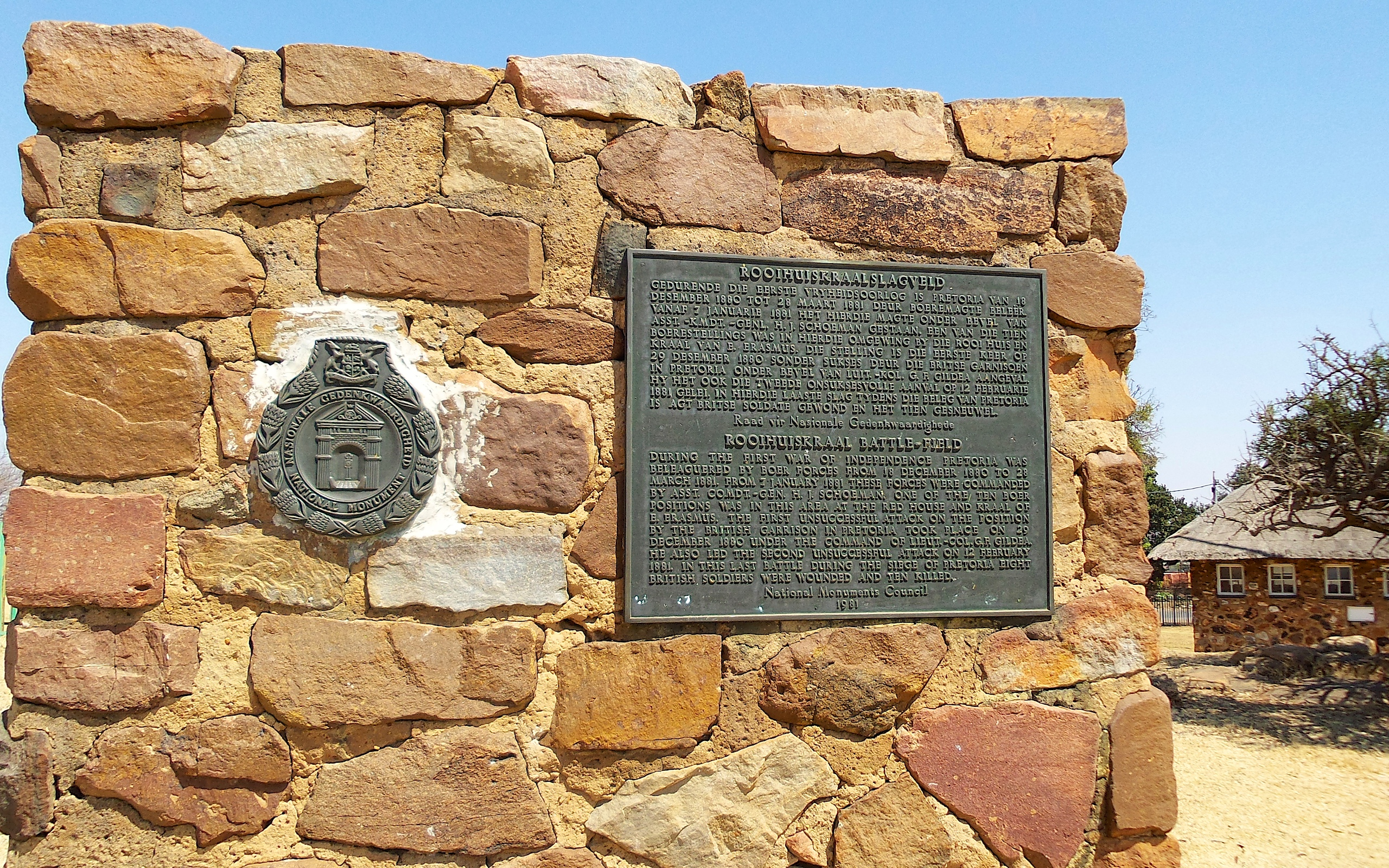
- Rooihuiskraal Battlefield Memorial
Date	12 February 1881
Location	Rooihuiskraal, South Africa 25°53′00″S 28°08′31″E
Result	Boer victory

Belligerents
South African Republic	United Kingdom

Commanders and leaders
(South African Republic) Daniel Jacobus Elardus Erasmus	(United Kingdom of Great Britain and Ireland) Lt-Col George Frederick Gildea (WIA)

Strength
Unknown	Pretoria Garrison

Casualties and losses
Unknown	1 killed and 15 wounded
- Location within South Africa

The Battle of Rooihuiskraal on 12 February 1881 was a military engagement during the First Boer War which took place at Rooihuiskraal just south of Pretoria.

== Background ==
The British Pretoria Garrison under the command of Lt-Col George Frederick Gildea moved out of their besieged positions at Pretoria to join the forces of General George Pomeroy Colley in Natal. The Boers under the command of D.J. Erasmus Jr had gotten wind of the British attempt to escape Pretoria, and entrenched themselves behind a stone wall that surrounded the animal stockade at Rooihuiskraal.

== Battle ==
The British force arrived at Rooihuiskraal on 12 February 1881 and was immediately fired upon by the Boer troops. In the confusion that followed in the British lines, Lt-Col Gildea stood upright in his stirrups while on horseback to motivate and rally his troops, when he was struck in the buttocks by a Boer bullet. The British were forced to retreat to their previous positions in Pretoria.

A single British soldier was killed during the battle and a further 15 (Including Lt-Col George Frederick Gildea) were wounded. The casualties on the Boer side are unknown.

== Aftermath ==
The British defeat at Rooihuiskraal had a demoralizing effect on the rest of the army. The Pretoria Garrison was unable to meet up with General George Pomeroy Colley's forces in Natal and following the Battle of Majuba Hill on 27 February, in which General Colley was killed, The First Boer War came to an end. The animal stockade at Rooihuiskraal has since been declared a national monument.
