= Daniel Jacobus Elardus Erasmus =

Boer general (1845 - 1914)

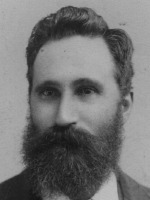

Boer War General of the South African Republic

Personal details
- Born: 4 March 1845 Doornkloof, Pretoria, South African Republic (present-day Irene, Pretoria, South Africa
- Died: 7 May 1914 (aged 69) Grootfontein, Pretoria, Union of South Africa
- Resting place: Pretoria, South Africa
- Spouse(s): Magdalena Margaretha Erasmus, Sibella ("Beppie") Margaretha Aletta Schabort
- Children: 11, seven daughters and four sons
- Profession: Politician and military commander

Military service
- Allegiance: South African Republic
- Years of service: 1880–1902
- Battles/wars: First Boer War; Battle of Rooihuiskraal; Malaboch War; Mpefu War; Second Boer War

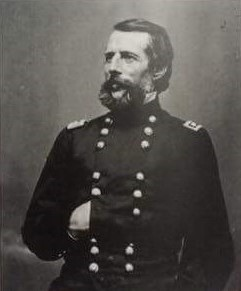
Daniel Jacobus Elardus Erasmus.

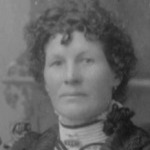
Sibella ("Beppie") Margaretha Aletta Schabort (1852–1912), Erasmus's second spouse.

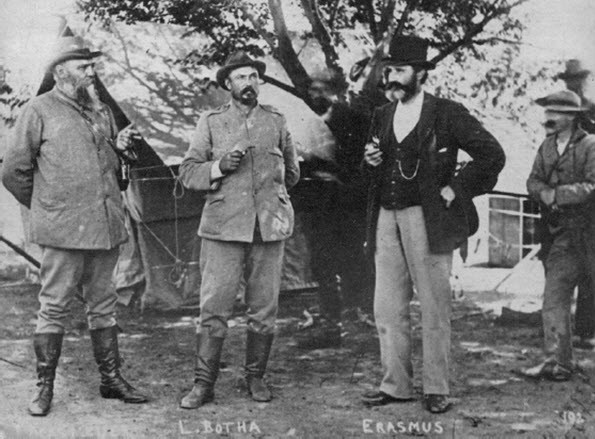
From left to right: Boer generals Lucas Meijer, Louis Botha and a posh Daniel Erasmus in the field, before 1903.

Daniel Jacobus Elardus Erasmus (4 March 1845 – Pretoria, 7 May 1914) was a South African Boer military commander and notable Boer military figure of the First and Second Anglo-Boer Wars.

== Family ==
Daniel Erasmus was born the third child and eldest son to Daniel Elardus (2) Erasmus (also known as Daantjie Doornkloof, George, Cape Colony, 22 September 1815 – Doornkloof, district Pretoria, Transvaal, 15 April 1875) and Susara "Sarie" Margaretha Jacobs(z) (Cradock, Cape Colony, 30 June 1818 – Doornkloof, Pretoria, before 3 October 1871). Daniel had two elder sisters and two younger brothers including Commander (Kommandant) Stephanus Petrus Erasmus (nicknamed Swart Lawaai, around 1850 – 1921).

On 16 September 1866 Daniel married Magdalena Margaretha Erasmus (Farm Elandskraal, Pienaarsrivier, Transvaal, 2 November 1847 – Elandskraal, Pienaarsrivier, 7 June 1873). They had two sons and one daughter. The widower then married Sibella ("Beppie") Margaretha Aletta Schabort (Vijgenboom, Western Cape, 13 March 1852 – Grootfontein, Pretoria, 13 October 1912) on 25 April 1876 in Heidelberg. They had six daughters and two sons.

== Career ==
=== First Boer War (1880-1881) ===
Daniel Erasmus took part in the Battle of Bronkhorstspruit of 20 December 1880 during the First Boer War and besieged the British garrison in Pretoria, blocking three outbreaks. Following the restoration of the independence of the South African Republic (ZAR), Erasmus became a member of the Volksraad and Commander of the Pretoria Commando, fighting in the Malaboch War (1894) and the campaign against Venda chieftain, Mpefu in the Magato War in 1898.

=== Second Boer War 1899-1902 ===
At a general Boer council of war on 11 October 1899 at Zandspruit/Sandspruit, just over the border of Natal Colony east of Newcastle and south of Utrecht, Erasmus was nominated Assistent Kommandant Generaal, second in command to Transvaal Commander-in-chief Piet Joubert. General Erasmus fought many battles against the British with his Pretoria Commando, for instance the Battle of Talana Hill (20 October 1899), the Battle of Rietfontein (24 October 1899), and the Siege of Ladysmith. Later on General Erasmus was head of the military court (Militaire Hof) for the districts of Heidelberg, Pretoria, Middelburg and Bethal. After the British occupation of the state capitals Bloemfontein (13 March 1900) and Pretoria (5 June 1900) Erasmus continued to fight. In the end he was captured by troops of General Bruce Hamilton from Ermelo on 3 January 1902, not far from Amsterdam near the border with Swaziland. Erasmus was transferred to a prisoner of war camp at Saint Helena, where he remained for five months until his release as a consequence of the peace Treaty of Vereeniging signed on 31 May 1902.

== Literature ==
- A.E., Onze Krijgs-officieren. Album van portretten met levens-schetsen der Transvaalse Generaals en Kommandanten (Translated title: Our Military Officers. Album of portraits with life sketches of the Transvaal Generals and Commandants), Volksstem, Pretoria 1904. In Dutch with a preface by Louis Botha. PDF on Wikimedia Commons. Page 18.
- Breytenbach, J. H. (1969–1996). Die Geskiedenis van die Tweede Vryheidsoorlog in Suid-Afrika, 1899–1902 [The History of the Second War of Independence in South Africa, 1899–1902] (in Afrikaans). Pretoria: Die Staatsdrukker.
  - Breytenbach, J. H. (1969). Die Boere-offensief, Okt. – Nov. 1899 [The Boer Offensive, Oct. – Nov. 1899]. Die Geskiedenis van die Tweede Vryheidsoorlog in Suid-Afrika, 1899–1902 (in Afrikaans). Vol. I. Pretoria: Die Staatsdrukker. OCLC 798106662. Pages 167, 169–171, 180–182, 187–192, 212, 217, 219, 227, 232–234, 265, 270–272, 275–280, 284–287, 300–302, 306–307, 329, 352, 358–360, 361 note, 469.
  - Breytenbach, J. H. (1971). Die eerste Britse offensief, Nov. – Des. 1899 [The first British offensive, Nov. – Dec. 1899]. Die Geskiedenis van die Tweede Vryheidsoorlog in Suid-Afrika, 1899–1902 (in Afrikaans). Vol. II. Pretoria: Die Staatsdrukker. Pages 236, 428–429, 431, 433, 435–436, 441–444, 449–450.
  - Breytenbach, J. H. (1973). Die stryd in Natal, Jan. – Feb. 1900 [The battle in Natal, Jan. – Feb. 1900]. Die Geskiedenis van die Tweede Vryheidsoorlog in Suid-Afrika, 1899–1902 (in Afrikaans). Vol. III. Pretoria: Die Staatsdrukker. ISBN 9780797012394. OCLC 612581136. Pages 21, 51–58, 60, 97–98, 108–109, 111, 123, 230, 373, 439, 444, 480, 530–531, 538–539, 554, 556, foto no 24.
  - Breytenbach, J. H. (1983). Die Britse Opmars tot in Pretoria [The British advance to Pretoria]. Die Geskiedenis van die Tweede Vryheidsoorlog in Suid-Afrika, 1899–1902 (in Afrikaans). Vol. V. Pretoria: Die Staatsdrukker. ISBN 9780621083606. OCLC 769254652. Page 497 for genl D.E. Erasmus.
  - Breytenbach, J. H. (1996). Die beleg van Mafeking tot met die Slag van Bergendal [The siege of Mafeking up to the Battle of Bergendal]. Die Geskiedenis van die Tweede Vryheidsoorlog in Suid-Afrika, 1899–1902 (in Afrikaans). Vol. VI. Pretoria: Die Staatsdrukker. ISBN 9780797033214. OCLC 813492747. Pages 64, 115, 143, 148, 160, 271, 286, 319.
- Thomas Pakenham, The Boer War, George Weidenfeld & Nicolson, London, 1979. Abacus, 1992. ISBN 0 349 10466 2. Pages 128 talana, 147 visits hospital expresses condolences on symons death, and 169 Lucas Meyer had not waited for Erasmus to come to Dundee.
- Preller JF (1972). "Erasmus, Daniel Jacobus Elardus". In De Kock WJ, Krüger DW (eds.). Dictionary of South African Biography Vol II (1st ed.). Cape Town and Johannesburg: Tafelberg-Uitgewers. pp. 219–220. ISBN 0624003698. OCLC 1063845175.
