= Low Rock Castle =

Former listed building in County Londonderry, Northern Ireland

Coordinates: 55.1786°N 6.7243°W

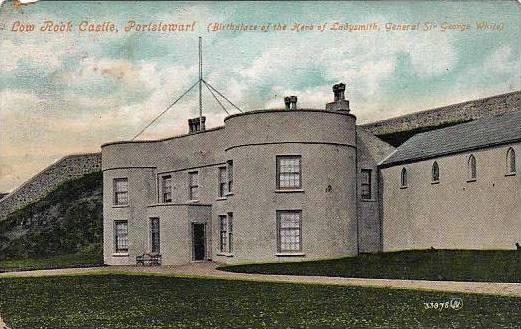
Low Rock Castle, Portstewart in 1906

Low Rock Castle was a listed building in Portstewart in County Londonderry, Northern Ireland.

== History ==
The house, which was originally battlemented, was completed around 1820. In 1835 it became the birthplace of Field Marshal Sir George White VC, who commanded the garrison at the Siege of Ladysmith during the Second Boer War.

It was demolished without permission in 2001 during the construction of a block of apartments that now occupy the site.

== Sources ==
- Durand, Henry Mortimer (1915). The life of Field-Marshal Sir George White, V.C. Edinburgh, London: W. Blackwood. ISBN 978-1177733694.
- Hughes, L (1990). Sophia: Regent of Russia, 1657-1704. Yale University Press. ISBN 978-0300047905.
