= Nieuwe Republiek =

Former country

New Republic Nieuwe Republiek
- 1884–1888
- Flag Coat of arms

- Location of the Nieuwe Republiek in Southern Africa (1884–1888)
- Status: Boer republic
- Capital: Vryheid
- Common languages: Dutch; Zulu
- President
  - 1884–1888: Lucas Johannes Meyer
- History
  - Established: 5 August 1884
  - Disestablished: 20 July 1888
- Currency: Pond
| Preceded by | Succeeded by |
| Zulu Kingdom | South African Republic |

The Nieuwe Republiek ("New Republic") was a small Boer republic which existed from 1884 to 1888 in present-day South Africa. It was recognised only by Germany and the South African Republic. Its independence was proclaimed on 16 August 1884, with land donated by the Zulu Kingdom through a treaty. It covered 13,600 square kilometres (5,300 sq mi) and the capital was Vryheid or Vrijheid ("Freedom" in Afrikaans or Dutch, respectively), both being alternative names of the state. The founder and president until it requested incorporation into the South African Republic on 20 July 1888 was Lucas Johannes Meyer, while Daniel Johannes Esselen acted as Secretary of State during the same period.

== History ==
The origins of the republic can be traced to the Anglo-Zulu war of 1879, which had created a great deal of turmoil in the area bordering Zululand, with refugees overrunning the lands of border farmers, as well as disrupting the seasonal movement of livestock. This created a desire to impose order, as well as enticing its participants with the possibility of gaining new lands for the Boers, who were trying to extend their territories. To this end, the Boers from the Utrecht and Wakkerstroom regions initially approached the recently defeated Cetshwayo and offered support in return of grants of land. They were, however, rebuked.

After Cetshwayo died, the Boers allied with the heir to the throne: Dinizulu, and offered their help in establishing his rule in exchange for land, to which Dinizulu agreed in April 1884. Around 150 Boers initially joined the expedition, as well as some Germans from the Luneburg settlement, with some Boers participating having resigned their posts in the government of Transvaal, due to the disapproval that the government had expressed for the expedition. However, this disapproval was most probably nominal, due to the involvement of so many local officials in the affair, as well as the possibility of obtaining a coastal area from this expedition, in the form of St Lucia, which the landlocked country of Transvaal was desperately trying to achieve.

The expedition commenced in the May of 1884, by which time the number of volunteer Boers participating had doubled, with volunteers coming 'from as far afield as Grey town', and included the future prime minister of the Union of South Africa: Louis Botha. After Boer farmers, who lived in the area, helped Dinuzulu defeat his rival Zibhebhu for succession of the Zulu throne, land was given to them by way of cession by the new Zulu king along the banks of the Mfolozi River. The republic therefore initially gained the whole of the Northwest of Zululand.

On 5 August 1884 the Boers formed the Nieuwe Republiek (New Republic) with recognition by Germany, Zuid-Afrikaanse Republiek (ZAR) and Portugal with Vryheid as its capital. However, the Boers and the Dinizulu were faced with a challenge by Zibhebhu kaMapitha, chief of the Mandlakazi, who was not prepared to accept Boer demands, and who had previously defeated the Zulu king Cetshwayo. The two forces met on 5 June 1884 at the Battle of Tshaneni, where 100 Boers and an Usuthu impi of 7 000 Zulu defeated Zibhebhu.

The success of the Boers had attracted 500 more volunteers to the force, brought there by the prospect of gaining land. These volunteers were not only Boers, however, with Harriet Colenso stating that Natal provided as many 'filibusters and landgrabbers' for the expedition as did the Transvaal. The arrivals of these volunteers prompted the Boers to make bigger demands of the Usuthu peoples and Dinizulu, in order to have enough land to distribute amongst the claimants as a reward for participation in the expedition, so as to have a substantial number of people to found a republic. This was initially resisted by the Usuthu, however, seeing that they were in no position to negotiate, were forced to give in, an thus, on the 16th of August, Dinuzulu issued a proclamation granting 1 355 000 morgen(1 morgen being about 2 acres) of Zulu territory to the Boers for the establishment of a republic.

The surveying committees therefore went on to extend the border to the sea from the mouth of the Mhlatuze river to St Lucia Bay, since there were more claimants to the land than there was land itself. A lottery was held to allocate the lands, with a committee member(one of the initial founders of the enterprise) being entitled to a 3 000 morgen farm, a volunteer who had enlisted before the 10th of June 1884 to a 2 000 morgen farm and a volunteer who had enlisted after that date to a 1 000 morgen farm.

The Nieuwe Republiek was finally recognized by the British on 22 October 1886. However, under the agreement by which the republic was recognised by Britain, it was agreed that, the area in the Melmouth district be administered by the British, something for which the president and the Volsraad of the new republic received as much and criticism as the British themselves. This caused the popularity of Lucas Meyer and the ruling clique to plummet. Seeking to maintain their position, Lucas Meyer therefore decided to not hold promised elections, and to seek the incorporation of the republic into Transvaal. Within a few months the British annexed a stretch of the coastline of the Nieuwe Republiek and the Zulu Kingdom north of the Thukela river (1887) in order to prevent the new Boer republic from having access to the sea, which they needed for a harbor.

British annexation of the Zulu territory resulted in a revolt, led by Dinuzulu in June 1888, which was quickly suppressed. Dinuzulu was tried for high treason in Eshowe and sentenced. The annexation of Zululand led to residents in the Nieuwe Republiek fearing they would be annexed by Britain. On 20 July 1888 the New Republic was incorporated with the Transvaal Republic on its own request, although enjoying considerable autonomy. The relations between the Boers and the Zulu remained stable until the outbreak of the Second Boer War in 1899.

In June 1900, British forces entered Vryheid, the capital of the Nieuwe Republiek. Arthur Jesse Shepstone, the son of Sir Theophilus Shepstone, was sent to the area and worked together with British military intelligence officer J. Roberts to organise an alliance with the Zulus against the Boers. The British defeated a Boer force in Schurweberg, near Vryheid. In March 1901, Shepstone declared martial law in the region. After the Second Boer War the territory was transferred to the British colony of Natal in 1903.

== Gallery ==
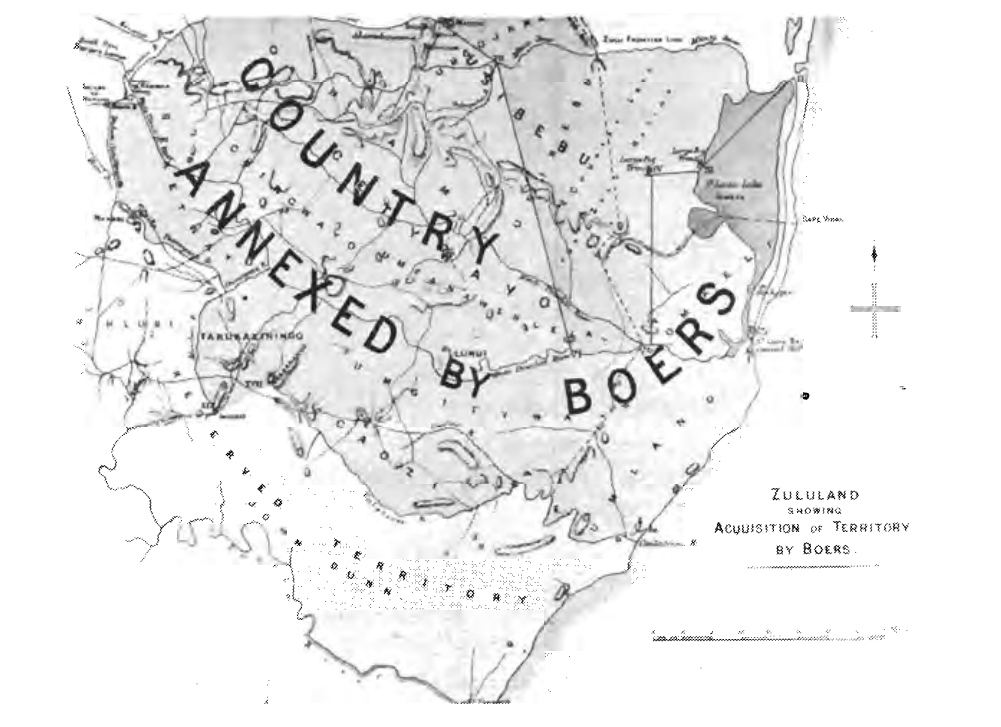
Initial Area of the New Republic as annexed by the Boers

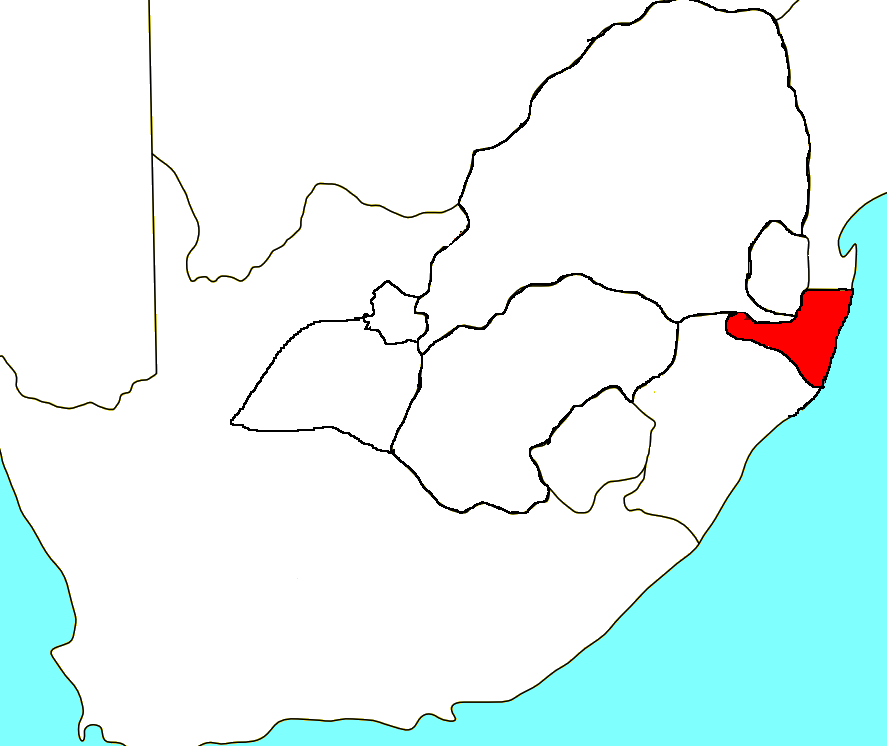
Location of the Nieuwe Republiek in Southern Africa

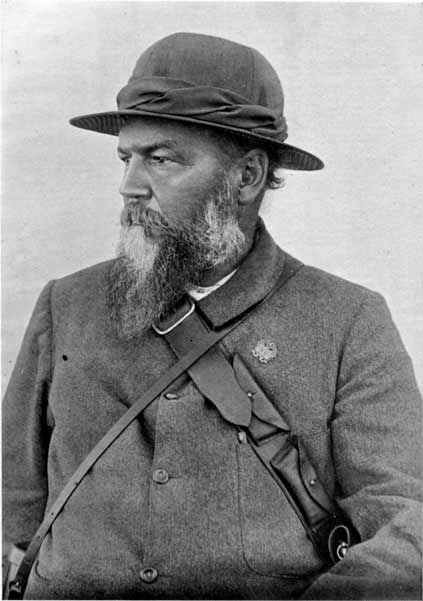
President Lucas Johannes Meijer

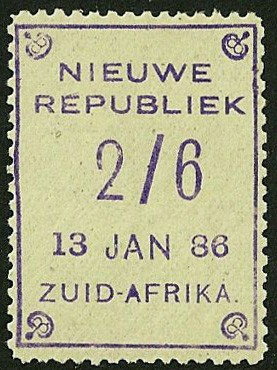
Postage stamp of the Nieuwe Republiek (1886)

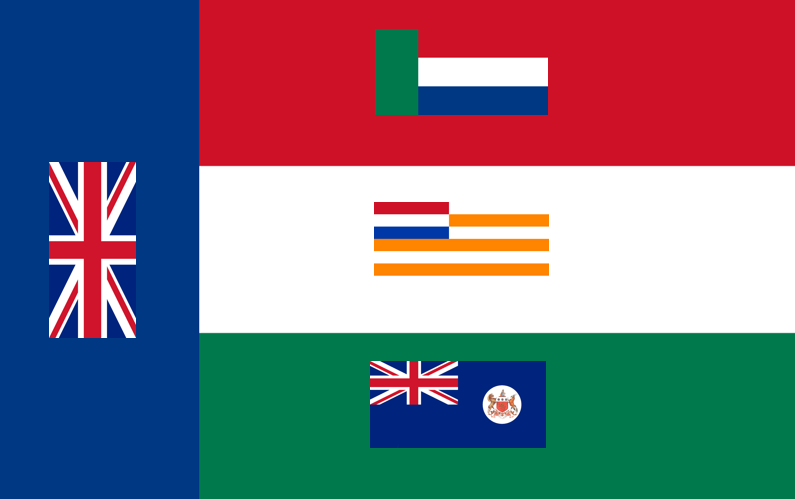
The original approved design of the New Republic flag

Original arms of the Nieuwe Republiek and subsequently taken over by the town of Vryheid

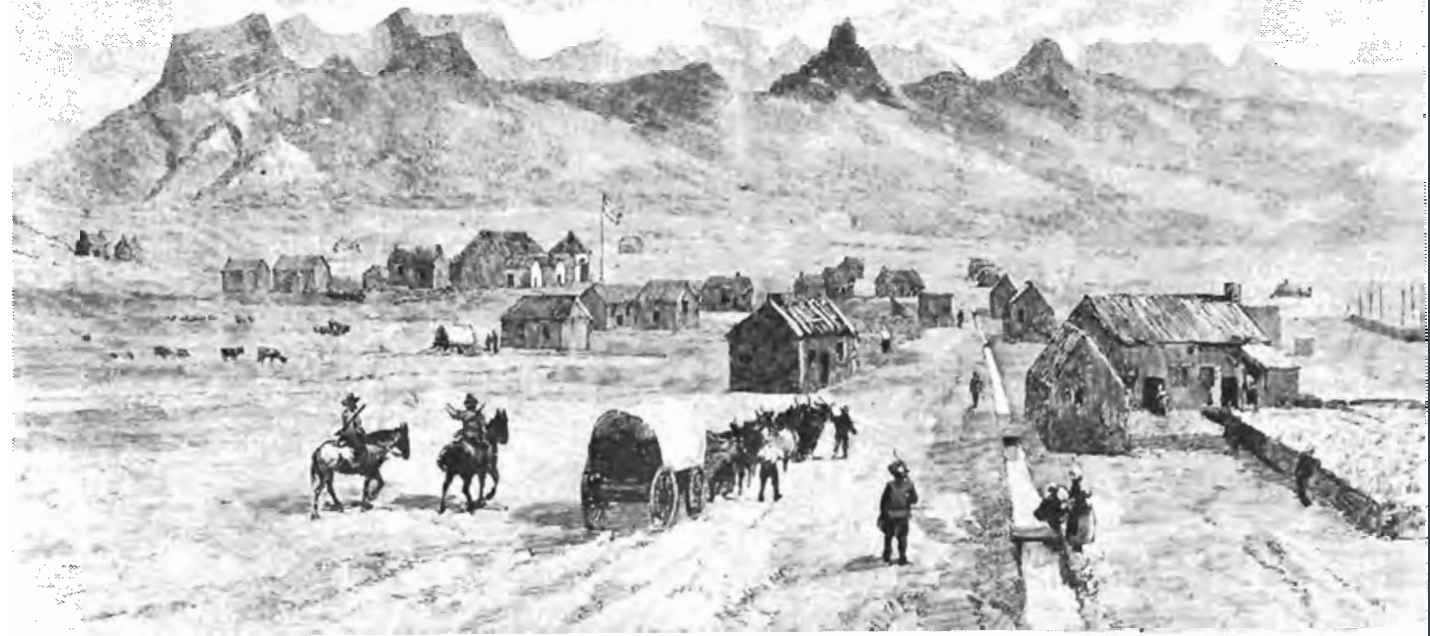
Vryheid in its infancy

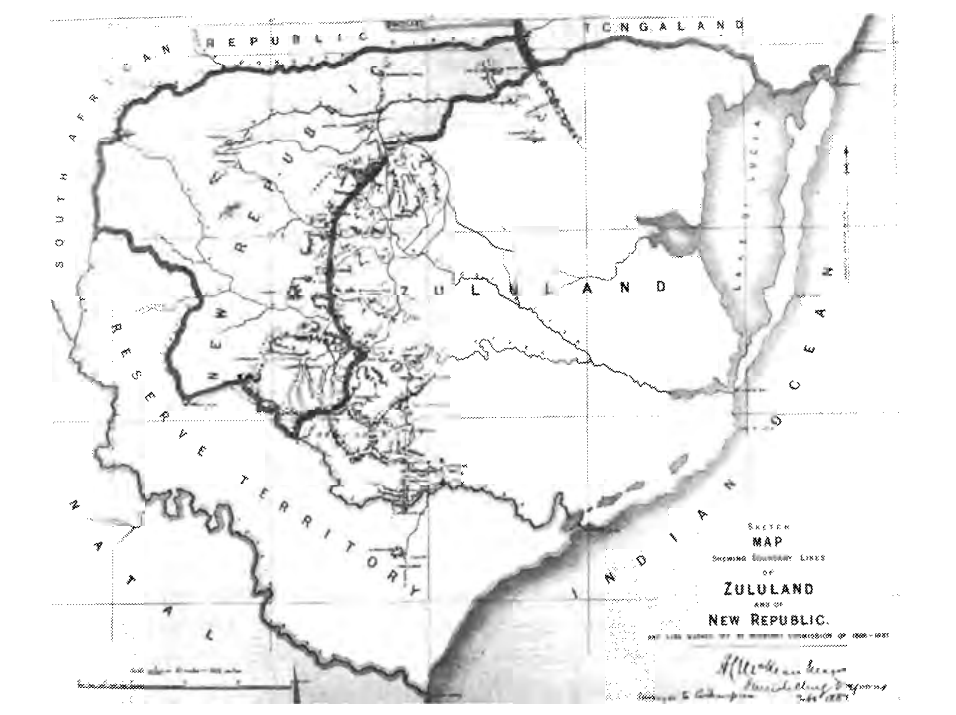
The division of Zululand by the British and the Boers

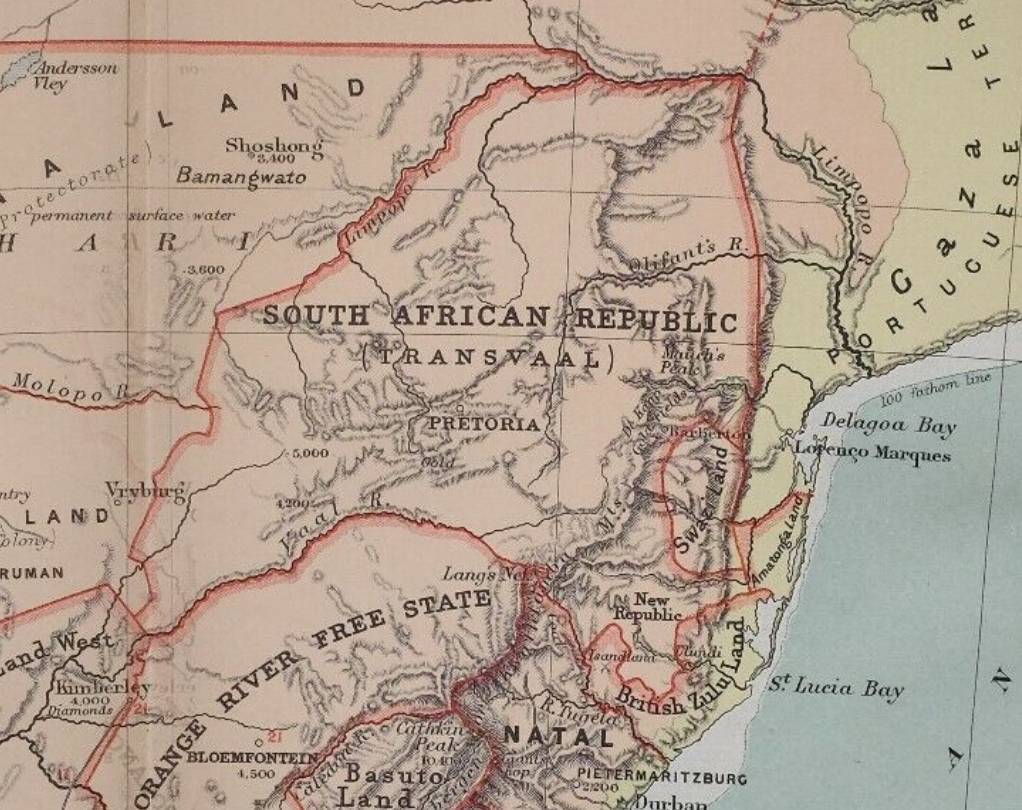
Area after the annexation of Zululand by Britain and the integration of the New Republic into Transvaal
