= Hatt, Cornwall =

Hamlet in Cornwall, England

Coordinates: 50.436°N 4.261°W

Hatt
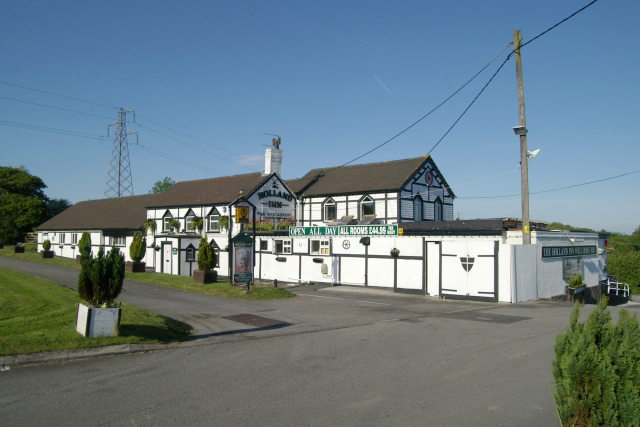
- The Holland Inn, Hatt, now The Cardinals

- Location within Cornwall
- OS grid reference: SX395620
- Unitary authority: Cornwall
- Ceremonial county: Cornwall
- Region: South West
- Country: England
- Sovereign state: United Kingdom
- Post town: Saltash
- Postcode district: PL12

Hatt is a hamlet in the civil parish of Botusfleming in east Cornwall, England, UK. It is on the A388 road from Callington to Saltash. Hatt House was built of red brick in about 1720 and is of two and a half storeys. The hamlet's main community area is situated at the Hatt Roundabout, with a petrol station and a playing field nearby as well as a 'bus stop providing travel to Callington, Launceston, Saltash and Plymouth.

== Etymology ==
The history of the name 'Hatt' is believed to originate in a tale, in which an unnamed cardinal was on a visit to Truro. After stopping at a local tavern, he went on his way but had lost his mitre. A local found it, exclaiming "The Cardinal's Hat!" before running it down to Truro. As a reward, the cardinal provided funding for the establishment of a parish and village.

== Local tradition ==
The annual "Big Lunch" celebration has become a recent tradition within the village, along with the neighbouring village of Botusfleming. Communal meals are held in the streets and the Recreational Field is opened up for games and sporting events. Normally, there is a charitable drive as well with any money raised given to charity.

== Notable people ==
- Major-General Sir William Penn Symons KCB was born at Hatt.
