= Battle of Elandsfontein =

Military action during the first Anglo-Boer War

- Part of the First Boer War
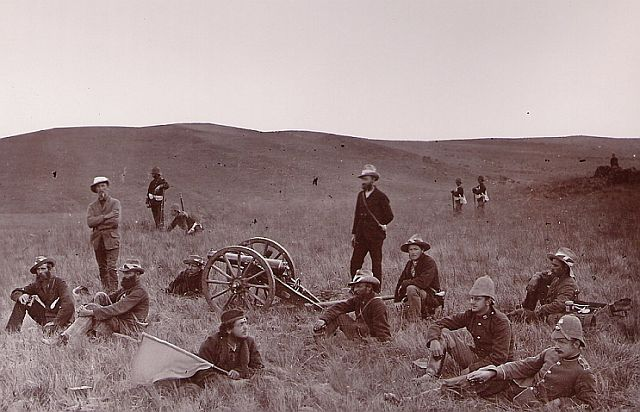
- Aftermath of the battle, in the foreground are British soldiers on patrol, a 7-pounder gun, and British Army Officers.
Date	16 January 1881
Location	Elandsfontein, South Africa 25°45′00″S 28°01′59″E
Result	Boer victory

Belligerents
South African Republic	United Kingdom

Commanders and leaders
(South African Republic) Unknown	(United Kingdom of Great Britain and Ireland) Lt-Col George Frederick Gildea (United Kingdom of Great Britain and Ireland) Col William Bellairs (United Kingdom of Great Britain and Ireland) Lieutenant J.W. Glynn

Strength
Unknown	154 Pretoria Volunteers; 129 Royal Scots Fusiliers; 74 Pretoria Carbineers; 62 Cavalry; 39 men of the Royal Artillery; 30 men of the 94th Regiment; 170 mounted men including 45 mounted infantry a 9 and 7 pounder field gun a gun mounted cart

Casualties and losses
8 wounded	4 men killed and 6 wounded
- Location within South Africa

The Battle of Elandsfontein on 11 January 1881 was a military engagement during the First Boer War which took place at Elandsfontein ridge just west of Pretoria. During the war horses proved to be the main means of transport across the South African plains. Because of this, much effort was put in grass mowers by the British for the production of hay. It was during one such expedition to collect the necessary horse fodder on 11 January 1881 in a valley near Elandsfontein, that the British were spotted and attacked by a party of Boers. This resulted in the Boers capturing the mowing machine, a wagon and some mules while the British escaped the encounter. With the belief that their attackers had originated from a laager at Elandsfontein, an escorted expedition force was sent to the laager's believed location on 16 January 1881 to either assert dominance in the area or to destroy the camp outright.

== Pre-Battle Situation ==
The British expedition force was ordered to proceed to a Boer laager in Elandsfontein, West of Pretoria, on 16 January 1881. It consisted of 154 Pretoria Volunteers, 129 Royal Scots Fusiliers, 74 Pretoria Carbineers, 62 Cavalry, 30 men of the 94th Regiment, 170 mounted men including 45 mounted infantry, 39 men of the Royal Artillery, a 9 and 7 pounder field gun and a gun mounted cart. The force was under the command of Lt-Col George Frederick Gildea and Col William Bellairs and left for the laager at 4.00 am. An additional force of Royal Engineers under the command of Lieutenant R.P. Littledale had been sent out earlier to create a diversion a few kilometers east of the laagers location. This diversion was made by exploding some dynamite at 6 am, when the main force was halfway to their destination. The distraction succeeded in drawing away a small band of Boer fighters towards the direction of the explosions.

== The Battle ==
When the British force arrived, they noticed that the Elandsfontein ridge was occupied by the Boers with its left side fortified with a stone blockhouse and a loop-holed wall. A signal fire was also burning in the Boer camp, suggesting that the British force had already been spotted. Wasting no time, the British commanders began to prepare battle formations starting with sending out 50 Pretoria riflemen 5 kilometers out left to capture the Quagga Poort pass. The cavalry was then sent out to scout out the right and position themselves to the north against the stone defences on the opposite end of the ridge. The Pretoria Carbineers were sent to a hill 2 kilometers to the left in order to engage any upcoming Boer reinforcements. The remainder of the Pretoria rifle troops were put in reserve on a rocky rise while the Artillery was wheeled into position and the wagons were laagered. The Royal Scots Fusiliers were put in a forward attack position towards the enemy camp.

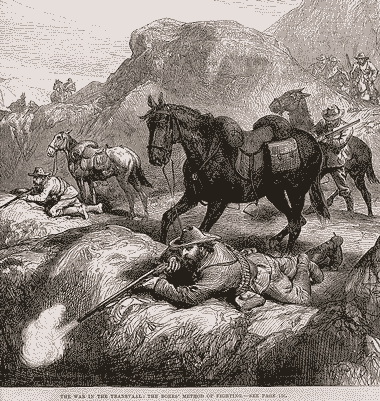
Boers situated on the ridge engaging the British.

Lt-Col Gildea decided that the best course of attack would be from the ridge where the cavalry under the command of Lt J.W. Glynn was located. The cavalry men dismounted their horses and camouflaged them before engaging the enemy on foot, driving them back from rock to rock. In support of the attack wave, another 50 fusiliers alongside the mounted gun and the 94th regiment, were sent to the battle scene to drive the Boers off the ridge. The attacking force came within 200 meters of the Boers’ main defences before being halted by the defenders. The British kept up a steady bombardment of the enemy stone laager with their artillery which proved to be rather ineffective. In response to the stalemate, the mounted infantry and carbineers were deployed to the left of the battle and the 7 pounder field gun was repositioned on a hill which the British had trouble with hauling the gun up the ridge.

It was during this time that a large number of Boer reinforcements were spotted approaching the field from the southern Quagga Poort pass. The now relocated Carbineers being powerless to keep them at bay in comparison to their previous position. The defending Boers themselves, renewed their breakthrough efforts after spotting the arriving reinforcements. Despite still outnumbering the Boers and seemingly being within reach of capturing the laager, the British command didn't want to prolong the battle fearing the loss of many more men. Lt-Col Gildea ordered the retreat of his troops which was covered by his artillery at 11 am. The force arrived back in Pretoria at 3 pm.

== Aftermath ==
Although the battle proved to be a Boer victory, Lt-Col Gildea didn't consider the battle to be an extreme failure. Rather blaming the loss on the shortcomings of his own artillery and the skill of the Boers. During the retreat, two men named Lance-Corporal James Murray and Trooper John Danaher, distinguished themselves after saving a fellow soldier from the battlefield under heavy fire. They were both awarded the Victoria Cross for their actions. The new mowers were now ordered to operate under armed guard.
