= Siege of Pretoria =

Siege during the First Boer War

- Part of the First Boer War
Date	16 December 1880 – 28 March 1881
Location	Pretoria, South Africa
Result	Boer victory

Belligerents
United Kingdom of Great Britain and Ireland	South African Republic

Commanders and leaders
William Bellairs	D.J. Erasmus

Strength
1,340	6,000

Casualties and losses
9 dead, 38 wounded	21 dead, 6 wounded, 15 captured

The siege of Pretoria was a military engagement in the First Boer War, in which Boer forces laid siege to the British garrison at Pretoria. There was not much fighting in the siege, and the Boers had resorted to a strategy of just cutting off the British garrison, rather than attacking it. A few attempts were made, however, but none were successful. With the ceasefire in March 1881, the garrison surrendered upon hearing news of it.
