= Penn Symons =

British Army officer (d. 1899)

Lieutenant-General Sir Penn Symons KCB
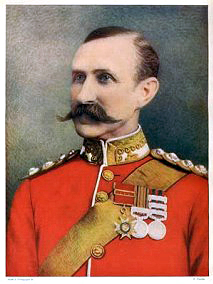
- Born: 17 July 1843; Hatt, Cornwall
- Died: 23 October 1899 (aged 56); Talana Hill, Dundee, KwaZulu-Natal
- Burial place: Talana Hill, Dundee, KwaZulu-Natal; 28°6′49″S 30°12′18″E
- Military career
- Allegiance: United Kingdom
- Branch: British Army
- Service years: 1863–1899
- Rank: Lieutenant-General
- Unit: 24th Foot
- Conflicts: Ninth Xhosa War; Anglo-Zulu War; Third Anglo-Burmese War; Chin-Lushai Expedition; Mahsud Expedition; Tochi Valley Expedition 1897–1898; Tirah Campaign; Second Boer War (DOW)
- Awards: Knight Commander of the Order of the Bath

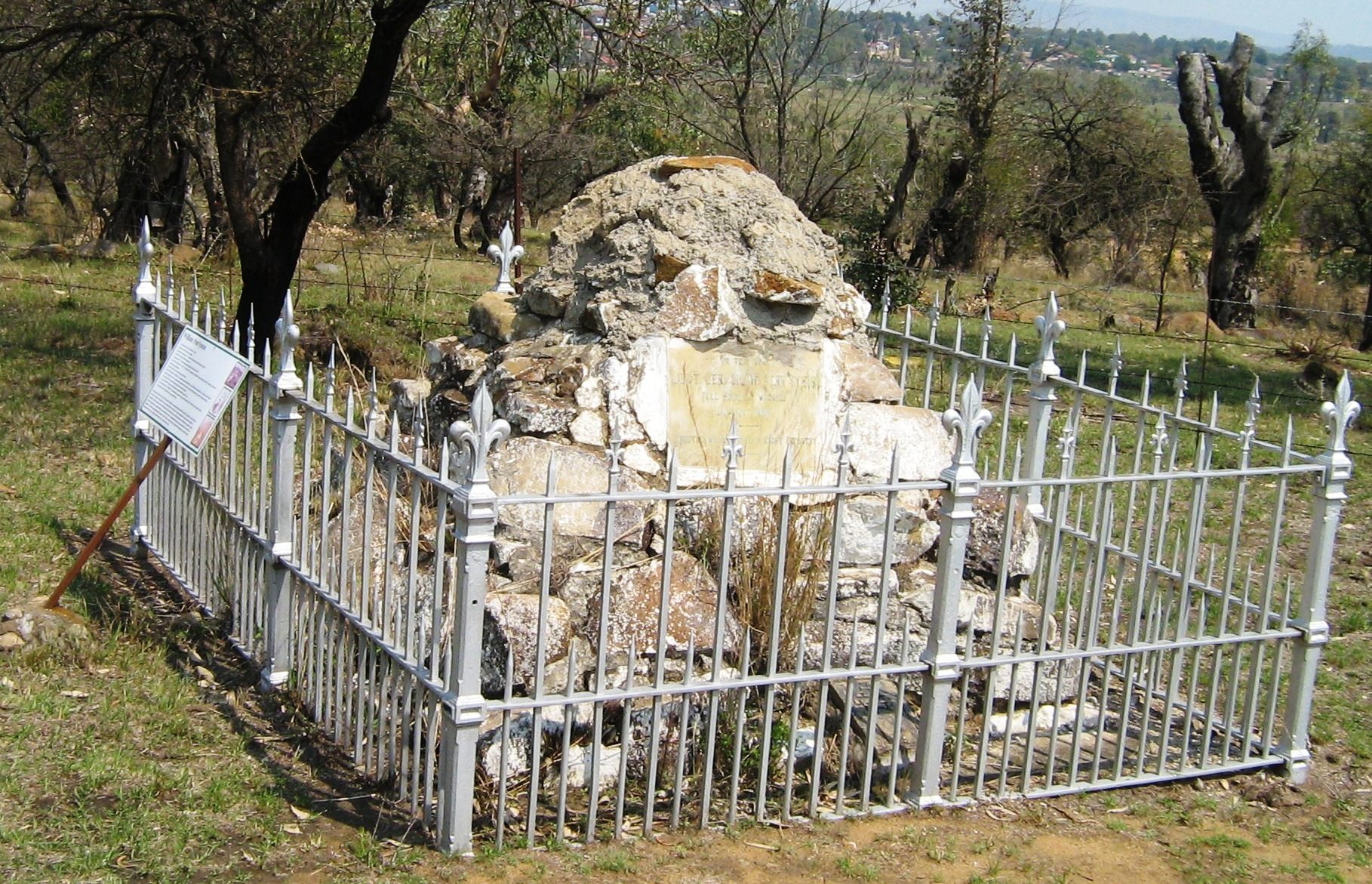
Dundee Talana Museum Memorial cairn to Gen Sir William Penn Symons

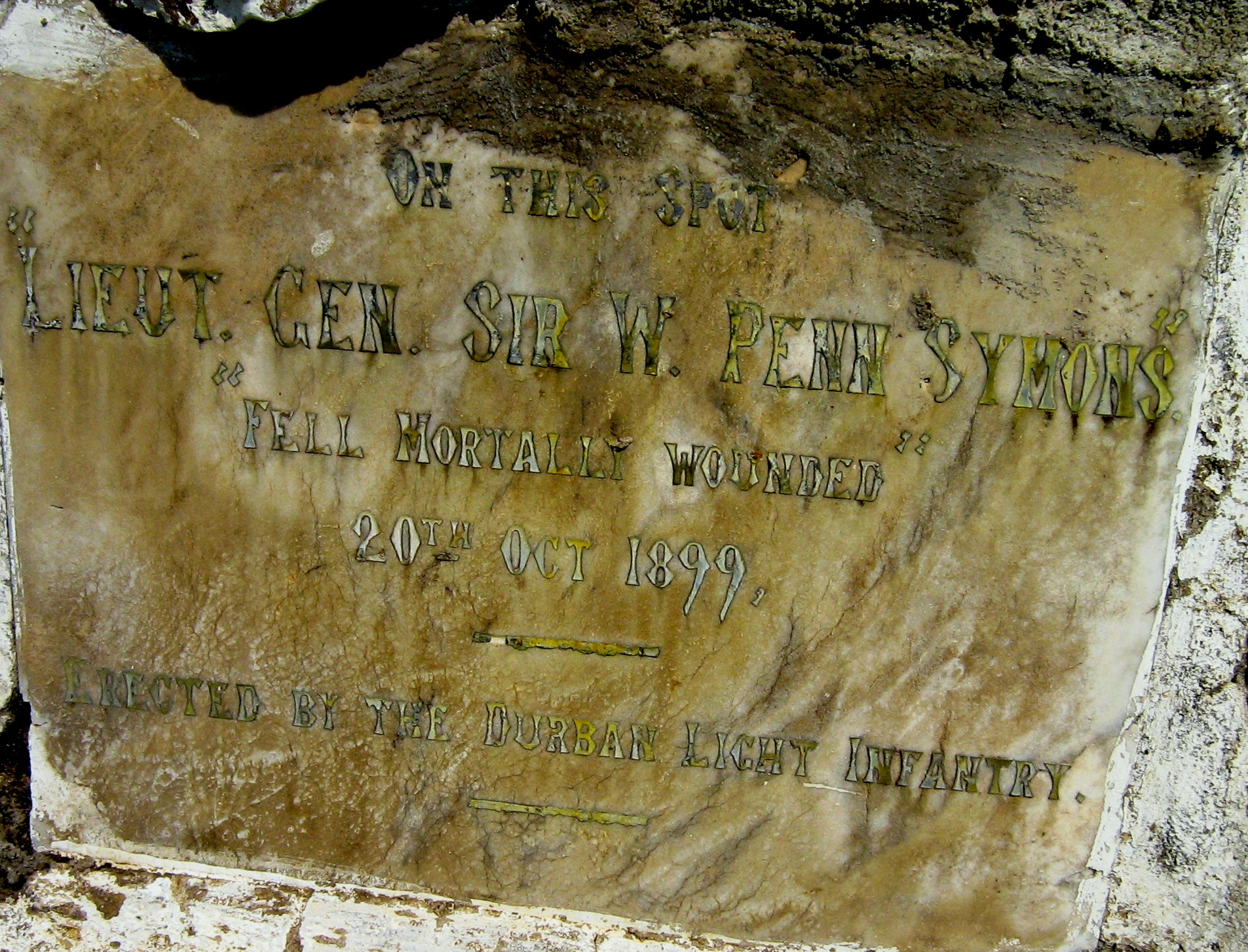
Dundee Talana Museum Memorial tablet to Gen Sir William Penn Symons

Lieutenant-General Sir William Penn Symons KCB (17 July 1843 – 23 October 1899) was a British Army officer who was mortally wounded as he commanded his forces at the Battle of Talana Hill during the Second Boer War. While his forces won the battle, they had to abandon their position and fall back to Ladysmith. Symons and the more severely wounded were left to the Boers; he died three days later. A monument to his valour was raised in Victoria Park, Saltash, Cornwall, UK.

== Early life and family ==
William Penn Symons was born on 17 July 1843 at Hatt, Cornwall, the eldest son of William Symons and Caroline Anne (née Southwell). He was educated privately and commissioned as an Ensign of the 24th Foot (later the South Wales Borderers) on 6 March 1863. He married Jane Caroline (née Hawkins) of Edgbaston on 13 February 1877 but the couple was childless.

== Military career ==
Symons was promoted to lieutenant on 11 December 1866 and captain on 16 February 1878. His first combat experience was in South Africa during the Ninth Xhosa War (1877–78) where as a captain of the 2nd Battalion of the 24th Foot faced the native Gcaleka and Ngqika tribes led by King Sandile kaNgqika. In 1879 he took part in the Zulu war and on 1 July 1881 he obtained his majority.

He then served during the Burmese Expedition (1885–89) being breveted as lieutenant colonel on 26 November 1886 and appointed as Assistant Adjutant General for Musketry in Madras (with the brevet rank of colonel) on 25 November 1887. In 1889 he commanded one of the two columns of the Burma Field Force in the Chin-Lushai Expedition for which he received the Companion of the Order of the Bath (CB).

On 31 September 1891 Symons was promoted to regimental lieutenant colonel where he would command the 2nd Battalion, South Wales Borderers, until being made A.A.G Musketry in Bengal in April 1883. Then in 1894-5 he commanded a brigade during the Waziristan Expedition being promoted to local (brevet) brigadier general on 25 March 1895. In 1898 he was in command of the 2nd Brigade, Tochi Field Force during the Tochi Valley Expedition 1897-98, after which he led the 1st Division in the Tirah Campaign and was awarded the Knight Commander of the Order of the Bath (KCB) on 20 May 1898.

=== Second Boer War ===
Colonel Symons was given the staff rank of brigadier general and was to be General Officer Commanding of Natal with temporary rank of major general on 15 May 1899; later that year on 20 September his staff rank would be raised to major general and on 9 October to lieutenant general.

When Symons arrived in South Africa there were around ten thousand troops spread between Cape Colony and Natal. He was asked by the War Office to advise on the number of troops required to safely garrison the Natal from the threat of invasion from the Boer Republics of the Transvaal and Orange Free State. His initial estimate was for an extra two thousand troops but he later raised that to five thousand. In the end the Cabinet decided to send ten thousand extra troops but they also appointed Lieutenant General Sir George White to supersede Symons as GOC in Natal.

However, before White arrived at Cape Town Penn Symons (who was known as a "fire eater"), had on his own authority deployed one of his brigades seventy miles north of Ladysmith at a town called Dundee. The position of both Ladysmith and Dundee was precarious as they stand in a triangle of Natal north of the Tugela River with the Orange Free State to the west and the Transvaal to the east. White wanted to recall the Dundee garrison to Ladysmith but because of political pressures from Sir Walter Hely-Hutchinson, the Governor of Natal, he agreed to leave them there. The Boers declared war on 11 October and began crossing the Natal borders the following day.

==== Battle of Talana Hill ====
On 20 October 1899 as dawn broke, men of the Dundee garrison spotted Boer troops on the nearby Talana hill (at 28°6′49″S 30°12′18″E) who proceeded to open fire on the town with their Creusot 75mm guns. Symons was annoyed by the "impudence" of the Boers to attack before breakfast. The British guns moved to return fire as the general surveyed the Boer positions and gave orders to his commanding officers.

Symons believed in old-fashioned military tactics of close order, where by concentrating troops on the attack he hoped to smash the Boer defences. The reality was that these formations were not designed to be used against long-range bolt-action rifles, and Symons' brigades would be the first of many in this war to pay the heavy cost of the mistake, as many generals would repeat it. However, his orders for the cavalry commander, Colonel Möller, were less conventional, telling him to act on his own initiative; it would be another costly mistake.

At 7:30 am the infantry battalions set off from the east of the town; first the 2nd Battalion Royal Dublin Fusiliers, then the 1st King's Royal Rifle Corps and lastly the 1st Royal Irish Fusiliers (the 1st Leicestershire Regiment were left to guard the camp). The first part of the advance went well and they reached a small wood at the foot of the hill where they found some shelter but beyond the wood there was a wall with a small gap and then open ground. Some of the Dublins were pinned down in a ditch ahead and the Fusiliers were lining the wall to the left. Shortly after 9am Symons rode up to the wood being followed by an aide-de-camp holding up a red pennant, to find out why the attack had stalled. He ordered the men to proceed, rode through the wood and dismounted, then walked through the gap in the wall still being followed by his pennant. After a few moments he returned and was helped to remount his horse. He then rode back from the front lines until he was out of sight from his troops before he asked for assistance from the Indian stretcher bearers as he had been shot in the stomach.

== Death ==
In excruciating pain from a severe wound to his stomach, Symons was taken to the 20th Field Hospital at Dundee. Despite this, all that he wanted to know was, "have they got the hill?" While the battle was won, their position at Dundee quickly became untenable. After a few wasted days, Symons' replacement, Brigadier General James Yule, finally decided to abandon the town along with the most severely wounded to the Boers, stealing away at night to Ladysmith. The next day, the town surrendered and thus the mortally-wounded Symons became a prisoner of war along with many others. Just before he died on 23 October he implored the medical officer, Major Donegan, to "tell everyone I died facing the enemy, tell everyone I died facing the enemy".

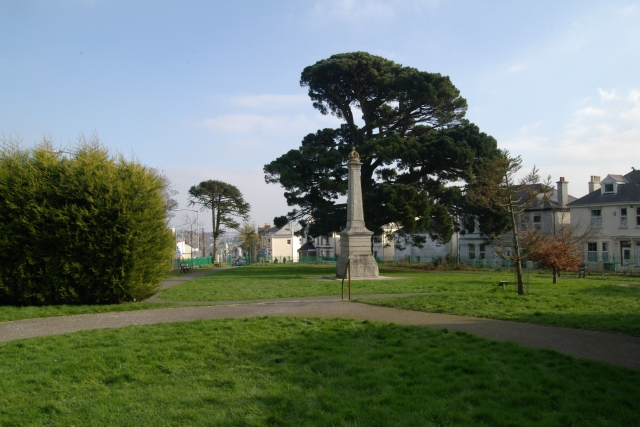
The Symons monument, Saltash

Winston Churchill wrote in his telegrams to The Morning Post:

So Sir Penn Symons is killed! Well, no one would have laid down his life more gladly in such a cause. Twenty years ago the merest chance saved him from the massacre at Islandhlwana, and Death promoted him in an afternoon from subaltern to senior captain. Thenceforward his rise was rapid. He commanded the First Division of the Tirah Expeditionary Force among the mountains with prudent skill. His brigades had no misfortunes: his rearguards came safely into camp. In the spring of 1898, when the army lay around Fort Jumrood, looking forward to a fresh campaign, I used often to meet him. Everyone talked of Symons, of his energy, of his jokes, of his enthusiasm. It was Symons who had built a racecourse on the stony plain; who had organised the Jumrood Spring Meeting; who won the principal event himself, to the delight of the private soldiers, with whom he was intensely popular; who, moreover, was to be first and foremost if the war with the tribes broke out again; and who was entrusted with much of the negotiations with their jirgas. Dinner with Symons in the mud tower of Jumrood Fort was an experience. The memory of many tales of sport and war remains. At the end the General would drink the old Peninsular toasts: 'Our Men', 'Our Women', 'Our Religion', 'Our Swords', 'Ourselves', 'Sweethearts and Wives', and 'Absent Friends'–one for every night of the week. The night I dined the toast was 'Our Men'. May the State in her necessities find others like him!

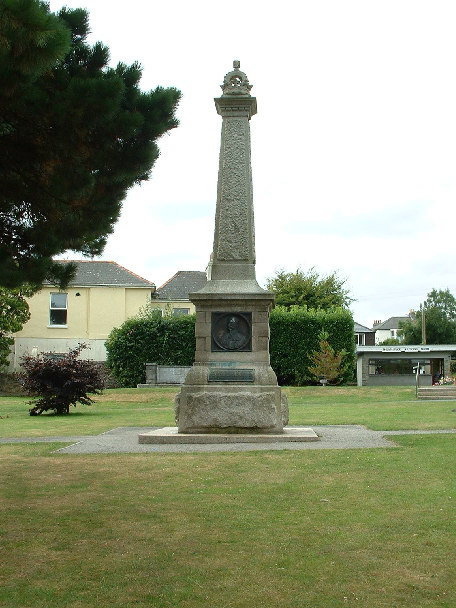
Victoria Park, Saltash

=== Memorials ===
The Durban Light Infantry erected a memorial stone over his grave at Dundee. Another monument to his valour was raised in Victoria Park, Saltash, Cornwall.

A memorial was erected in December 1902 in Umballa, from funds raised by the local population. He had been in command there until he left for South Africa.

== Notes ==
=== Sources ===
- "South Wales Borderers: Sir William Penn Symons". britishempire.co.uk.
- Bruce Hunt. "William Penn Symons". brucehunt.co.uk. Archived from the original on 14 September 2010.
- Burnett, Maj. Charles K. (1905). The 18th Hussars in South Africa: the records of a cavalry regiment during the Boer War, 1899–1902. Winchester: Warren & son. ISBN 9781845749071.
- Churchill, W.S. (1900). London to Ladysmith via Pretoria. London: Longmans, Green & Co. at Project Gutenberg
- Lloyd, Ernest Marsh (1901). "Symons, William Penn" . In Lee, Sidney (ed.). Dictionary of National Biography (1st supplement). London: Smith, Elder & Co.
- E.M. Lloyd and Rev. James Lunt (2004). "Symons, Sir William Penn". In Lunt, James (ed.). Oxford Dictionary of National Biography (online ed.). Oxford University Press. doi:10.1093/ref:odnb/26898. (Subscription, Wikipedia Library access or UK public library membership required.)
- Pakenham, Thomas (1979). The Boer War. New York: Random House. ISBN 0-394-42742-4.
