= George Frederick Gildea =

British Lieutenant Colonel (1831–1898)

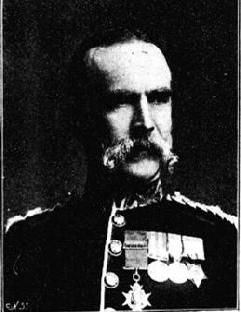
- Born: November 10, 1831; County Mayo, Ireland
- Died: April 24, 1898 (aged 66); Tullichewan Castle, Scotland
- Spouse(s): Fanny Power Florinda Gascoyne (m. 1863–1872) Eliza Campbell (m. 1874–1898)
- Military career
- Allegiance: United Kingdom
- Branch: British Army
- Service years: 1852 – 1890s
- Rank: Lieutenant Colonel
- Unit: 69th (South Lincolnshire) Regiment of Foot
- Conflicts: First Boer War: Battle of Elandsfontein

George Frederick Gildea (November 10, 1831 – April 24, 1898) was a British Lieutenant Colonel of Irish origin who was notable for commanding the 69th Foot during the First Boer War.

== Biography ==
George was born on November 10, 1831. He enlisted into service of the British Army in 1852.

During the First Boer War, Gildea was the primary commander of the garrison stationed at Pretoria and this led to the Battle of Elandsfontein and while the battle ended in a Boer victory, Gildea didn't consider the battle to be an extreme failure. In the official report of the battle, Gildea wrote the following:

The behaviour of all ranks engaged was good, but I cannot but give to Nourse's Horse, under Lieut Glynn, the chief honours of the day; the manner in which they took the hill, and drove the Boers before them could not be surpassed, and I cannot say how much I regret not having had the pleasure of completing the work they had so well begun. The behaviour of Sergt. Fitz-Clements, Nourse's Horse, who captured four horses from the enemy, is deserving of special notice, but that of Trooper John Donagher, of Nourse's Horse, and Lance-Corporal Murray, 94th Regiment, forms the subject of a special report.

Later in the same year, Gildea was promoted to colonel, and he died on April 24, 1898.

=== Family ===
Gildea married Fanny Power Florinda Gascoyne on March 21, 1863, in Ireland and had five children, but Fanny died after giving birth to the fifth child. Gildea later remarried to Eliza Campbell and had another child with her.
