= Battle of Talana Hill =

1899 battle of the Second Boer War

- Part of Second Boer War
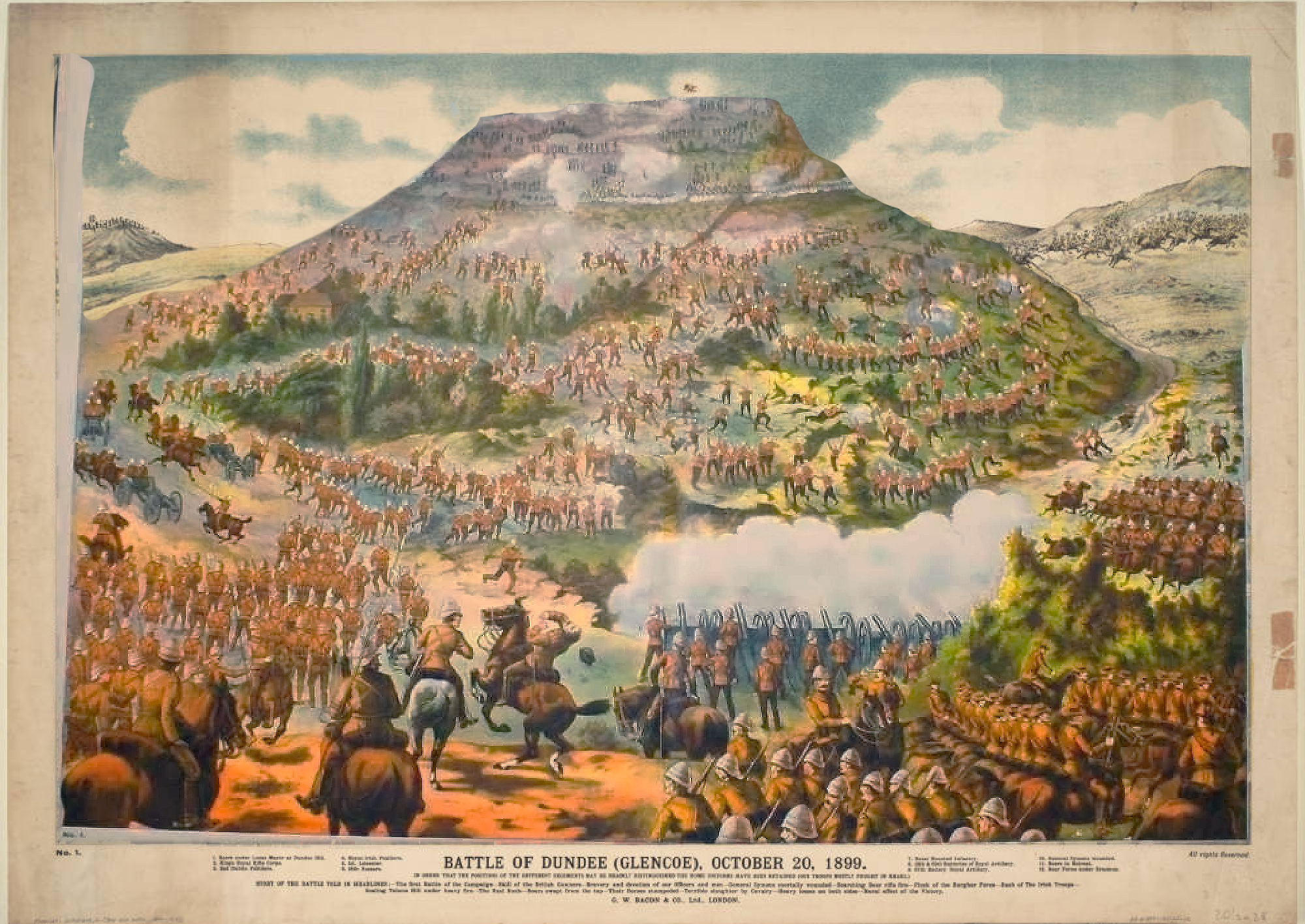
- The Battle of Talana Hill as depicted in Bacon's South Africa War prints
Date	20 October 1899
Location	Talana, Natal, South Africa 28°8′51″S 30°15′43″E
Result	British tactical victory

Belligerents
United Kingdom	South African Republic

Commanders and leaders
(United Kingdom) Lt-Gen. Sir William Symons (DOW)	(South African Republic) Gen. Lucas Meyer (South African Republic) Gen. Daniel Jacobus Elardus Erasmus

Strength
4,000; 18 field guns 1 machine gun	3,000; 3 field guns 2 pom pom guns

Casualties and losses
41 killed 185 wounded 220 captured or missing	23 killed 66 wounded 20 missing
- Location within South Africa

The Battle of Talana Hill, also known as the Battle of Glencoe, was the first major clash of the Second Boer War. A frontal attack by British infantry supported by artillery drove the Boers from a hilltop position, but the British suffered heavy casualties in the process, including their commanding general, Sir William Penn Symons, being mortally wounded.

== Prelude ==
Reinforcements sent to Natal by Britain immediately before the outbreak of war had moved into the northern path of the province of Natal, but not far enough forward to occupy the passes of the Drakensberg Mountains. As a result, the Boers could invade Natal from three sides.

Lieutenant-General Sir George White in command of forces in Natal requested that forces at Glencoe (Dundee) be withdrawn to concentrate his forces at Ladysmith where he held the bulk of the British garrison. The Governor of Natal considered it necessary to hold the position for political and economic reasons, so he dispatched Lieutenant-General Sir William Penn Symons to take control of the troops at Glencoe. War was declared at 5pm on 11 October; the Boers invaded on 12 October.

Symons commanded a brigade (four infantry battalions, part of a cavalry regiment and three companies of mounted infantry, three field artillery batteries) which occupied the coal-mining town of Dundee. Coal was strategically important to the British war effort, for it was needed to power the British steam locomotives. On the evening of 19 October, two Boer forces from the independent South African Republic, each numbering 4,000 men under General Lucas Meyer and General "Maroela" Erasmus closed in on Dundee.

== Battle ==
Before dawn on 20 October, Erasmus's force occupied Impati Mountain north of Dundee at 28°6′49″S 30°12′18″E. Meyer's men occupied the low Talana Hill east of the town at 28°8′51″S 30°15′43″E, and dragged several German-manufactured Krupp field guns to the top. As dawn broke and the British spotted the Boers on Talana Hill, these guns opened fire, ineffectually.

The British 16th and 69th Field Batteries galloped to within range and opened fire. Leaving the 1st Battalion Leicestershire Regiment and the 67th Field Battery to guard the camp, the British infantry, led by the 2nd Battalion Royal Dublin Fusiliers and supported in succession by the 1st Battalion King's Royal Rifle Corps (KRRC) and the 1st Battalion Royal Irish Fusiliers (RIF), moved forward to make a frontal attack, and reached the foot of the hill where they were to advance through a small wood. However, they were pinned down by heavy rifle fire from the top of Talana Hill. Symons went forward to urge them on, and was mortally wounded in the stomach – although he was able to mount his horse and ride back into Dundee, where he later died. Under Symons' successor, Brigadier-General James Yule, the KRRC managed to reach a small stone wall at the foot of Talana Hill, where the Dublin Fusiliers were pinned down by Boer fire. With the Royal Artillery laying down accurate fire on the summit, the KRRC supported by the RIF were able to proceed up the hill. When they reached the top, they suffered casualties from their own supporting artillery. The Boers abandoned their positions on the hill. Despite the British artillery being repositioned to harass the Boer retreat, they declined to fire, worried that they might hit their own troops again.

General Lukas Meyer's forces mounted their ponies and made off. A squadron of the 18th Hussars and the British mounted infantry tried to cut off their retreat, but most of the British horsemen strayed onto the slopes of Impati. General Erasmus's men, who had so far played no part in the battle due to Impati being shrouded in fog, surrounded the British mounted detachment and forced them to surrender.

== Aftermath ==
The British had won a tactical victory, but at a high cost – and a copy of the British Intelligence Notes on the Dutch Republics (which underestimated the Boer numbers and armament) fell into the hands of the Boers.

Yule's men were unable to contemplate attacking Impati Hill, which held Dundee's water supply. They marched and countermarched beneath the hill for two days under intermittent shellfire. Other Boer forces had cut the British line of supply and retreat. Finally, the British force retreated across country at night. After an arduous four-day march of 64 miles (103 km) they reached Ladysmith, where they reinforced the garrison.

== Sources ==
- Goodbye Dolly Gray: The story of the Boer War, Rayne Kruger, New English Library, 1964; new edition published by Pimlico, 1996, ISBN 0-7126-6285-5.
- Pakenham, Thomas (1979). The Boer War. Weidenfeld & Nicolson. ISBN 0-7474-0976-5.
