= James Yule =

British Army general

Brigadier-General James Yule CB
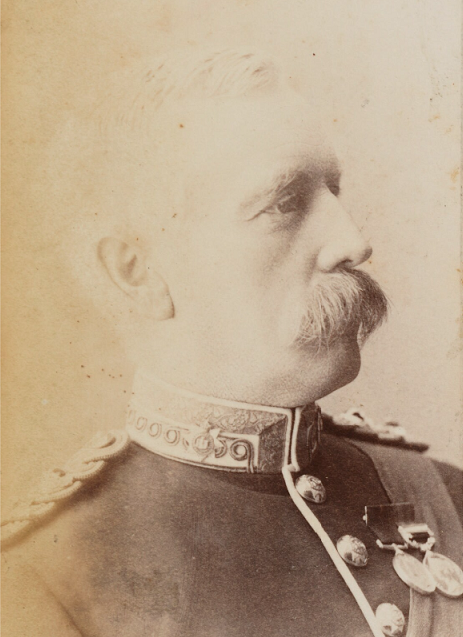
- Born: 26 April 1847; Mansfield
- Died: 7 May 1920 (aged 73)
- Military career
- Allegiance: United Kingdom
- Branch: British Army
- Service years: 1865–1901
- Rank: Brigadier-General
- Commands: 4th Division
- Conflicts: Second Boer War
- Awards: Companion of the Order of the Bath

Brigadier-General James Herbert Yule CB (26 April 1847 – 7 May 1920) was a senior British Army officer who briefly acted as General Officer Commanding the 4th Division during the Second Boer War.

== Early life ==
Yule was briefly educated at Rugby School for a single term. He was the son of Robert Abercromby Yule, a colonel who served in the 16th The Queen's Lancers and fought in the First Anglo-Sikh War.

== Military career ==
Yule was commissioned as an ensign in the 11th (North Devonshire) Regiment on 1 December 1865. He was deployed to Afghanistan for service the Second Anglo-Afghan War in 1879, to Burma to help with suppressing the Burmese resistance movement in 1891 and to India for service in the Tirah campaign in 1897.

Yule was then sent to South Africa for service in Second Boer War: he was given command of a brigade in the newly formed 4th Division in Northern Natal in September 1899 and was then given a new command with orders to defend Glencoe in October 1899. The division, which was under the command of Major-General Sir William Penn Symons, launched a frontal attack on the enemy during the Battle of Glencoe on 20 October 1899. However, Symons was seriously wounded, and Yule took over command of the division. Yule managed to secure the target of the attack, Talana Hill, but after finding it impossible to retain possession of the hill, withdrew the division to Ladysmith where it became part of the besieged garrison on 26 October 1899. He sailed for home in January 1900 and was appointed a Companion of the Order of the Bath for his service in South Africa on 27 September 1901.
