= George White (British Army officer) =

British Army general and recipient of the Victoria Cross

Field Marshal Sir George White VC GCB OM GCSI GCMG GCIE GCVO
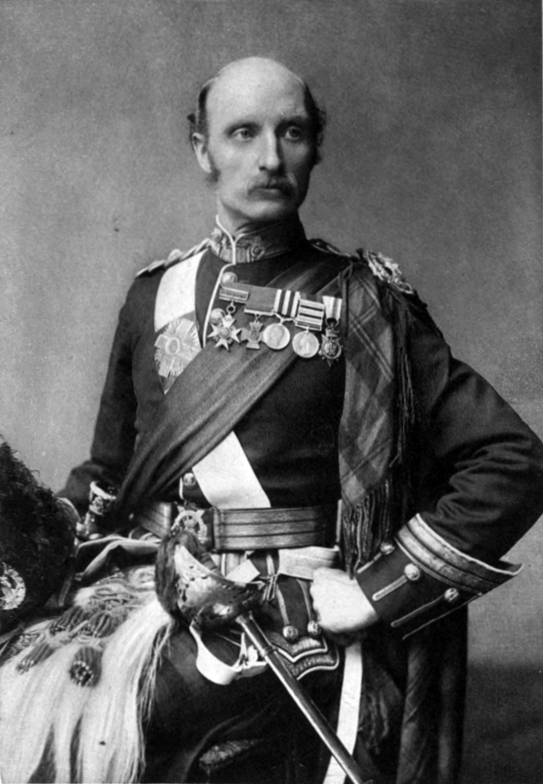
- Sir George Stuart White
- Born: 6 July 1835; Low Rock Castle, Portstewart, Ireland
- Died: 24 June 1912 (aged 76); Royal Hospital Chelsea, London, England
- Burial place: Broughshane Presbyterian Churchyard, County Antrim
- Military career
- Allegiance: United Kingdom
- Branch: British Army
- Service years: 1851–1905
- Rank: Field Marshal
- Commands: Commander-in-Chief, India; Quetta District; Upper Burma Field Force; 2nd Brigade; 2nd Battalion Gordon Highlanders
- Conflicts: Indian Mutiny; Second Anglo-Afghan War; Third Anglo-Burmese War; Mahdist War; Zhob Valley Expedition (1890–1891); Second Boer War
- Awards: Victoria Cross; Knight Grand Cross of the Order of the Bath; Member of the Order of Merit; Knight Grand Commander of the Order of the Star of India; Knight Grand Cross of the Order of St Michael and St George; Knight Grand Commander of the Order of the Indian Empire; Knight Grand Cross of the Royal Victorian Order
- Other work: Governor of Gibraltar; Governor of Royal Hospital Chelsea

Field Marshal Sir George Stuart White, VC, GCB, OM, GCSI, GCMG, GCIE, GCVO (6 July 1835 – 24 June 1912) was an officer of the British Army. He was stationed at Peshawar during the Indian Mutiny and then fought at the Battle of Charasiab in October 1879 and at the Battle of Kandahar in September 1880 during the Second Anglo-Afghan War. For his bravery during these two battles, he was awarded the Victoria Cross. He went on to command a brigade during the Third Anglo-Burmese War in 1886 and became commander of Quetta District in 1889 in which role he led operations in the Zhob Valley and in Balochistan. He was commander of the forces in Natal at the opening of the Second Boer War and fought at the Battle of Elandslaagte in October 1899. He commanded the garrison at the siege of Ladysmith: although instructed by General Sir Redvers Buller to surrender the garrison he responded "I hold Ladysmith for the Queen" and held out for another 75 days before being relieved in February 1900. He finished his career as Governor of Gibraltar and then as Governor of the Royal Hospital Chelsea.

== Early career ==
White was born at Low Rock Castle, Portstewart, County Londonderry. He was the son of James Robert White of Whitehall, Broughshane, County Antrim, and Frances Ann Stewart (daughter of George Stewart (d.1808), Surgeon-General to the British Forces in Ireland, and his wife Frances Stewart of Killymoon Castle). He was educated at Bromsgrove School in Worcestershire and later at King William's College on the Isle of Man and then at the Royal Military College, Sandhurst. He was commissioned an ensign in the 27th (Inniskilling) Regiment of Foot on 4 November 1853.

White was sent to India in 1854 and, having been promoted lieutenant on 29 January 1855, was stationed at Peshawar during the Indian Mutiny in 1857. He was promoted captain on 10 July 1863 and transferred to the 92nd Regiment of Foot on 4 August 1863. He returned to England before being further promoted major on 24 December 1863. After five years in England he went back to India with his regiment in 1868. He was given command of his battalion in 1875 and then fought at the Battle of Charasiab in October 1879 and at the Battle of Kandahar in September 1880 during the Second Anglo-Afghan War.

== Victoria Cross ==
He was 44 years old when the following deeds took place in Afghanistan for which he was awarded the VC:

For conspicuous bravery during the engagement at Charasiah on 6 October 1879, when, finding that the artillery and rifle fire failed to dislodge the enemy from a fortified hill which it was necessary to capture, Major White led an attack upon it in person. Advancing with two companies of his regiment; and climbing from one steep ledge to another, he came upon a body of the enemy, strongly posted, and outnumbering his force by about 8 to 1. His men being much exhausted, and immediate action being necessary, Major White took a rifle, and, going on by himself, shot the leader of the enemy. This act so intimidated the rest that they fled round the side of the hill, and the position was won. Again, on 1 September 1880, at the battle of Candahar, Major White, in leading, the final charge, under a heavy fire from the enemy, who held a strong position and were supported by two guns, rode straight up to within a few yards of them, and seeing the guns, dashed forward and secured one, immediately after which the enemy retired.

White's Victoria Cross is displayed at the Gordon Highlanders Museum, Aberdeen, Scotland.

== India ==
Appointed a Companion of the Order of the Bath in February 1881 and promoted to lieutenant colonel on 2 March, White was briefly Military Secretary to the Viceroy and Governor-General of India before being given command of the 2nd Battalion of the Gordon Highlanders in October that year. He then joined the staff in Egypt as assistant-adjutant and quartermaster-general in February 1885 with promotion to colonel on 2 March 1885.

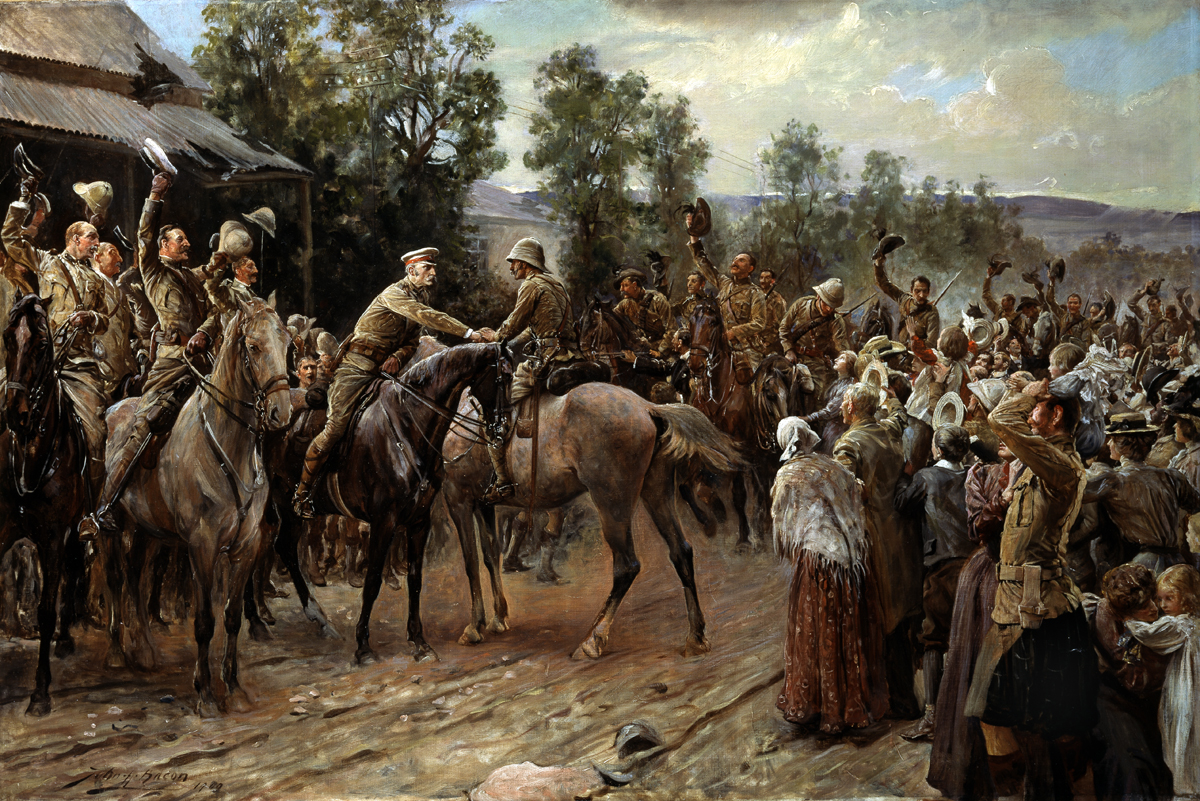
The Relief of Ladysmith. Sir George White greets Major Hubert Gough on 28 February 1900. Painting by John Henry Frederick Bacon (1868–1914)

In September 1885 White was given command of a brigade of the Madras Army and led it as the 2nd Brigade of the British Burma Division during the Third Anglo-Burmese War in November 1885. Promoted to local major general on 1 April 1886, he led the subsequent occupation of Burma as Commander of the Upper Burma Field Force in mid-1886 and was knighted as a Knight Commander of the Order of the Bath. Promoted to the substantive rank of major general on 1 July 1887, he was given command of Quetta District in April 1889 and led operations in the Zhob Valley and in Balochistan. In the 1890 New Year Honours List White was appointed a Knight Commander of the Order of the Indian Empire. Upgraded to a Knight Grand Commander of the Order of the Indian Empire in March 1893, he became Commander-in-Chief, India with the local rank of lieutenant general in April, which was made substantive on 1 April 1895. Made a Knight Grand Cross of the Order of the Bath in June 1897 and a Knight Grand Commander of the Order of the Star of India the following January, White became Quartermaster-General to the Forces in October 1898.

== South Africa and Ladysmith ==
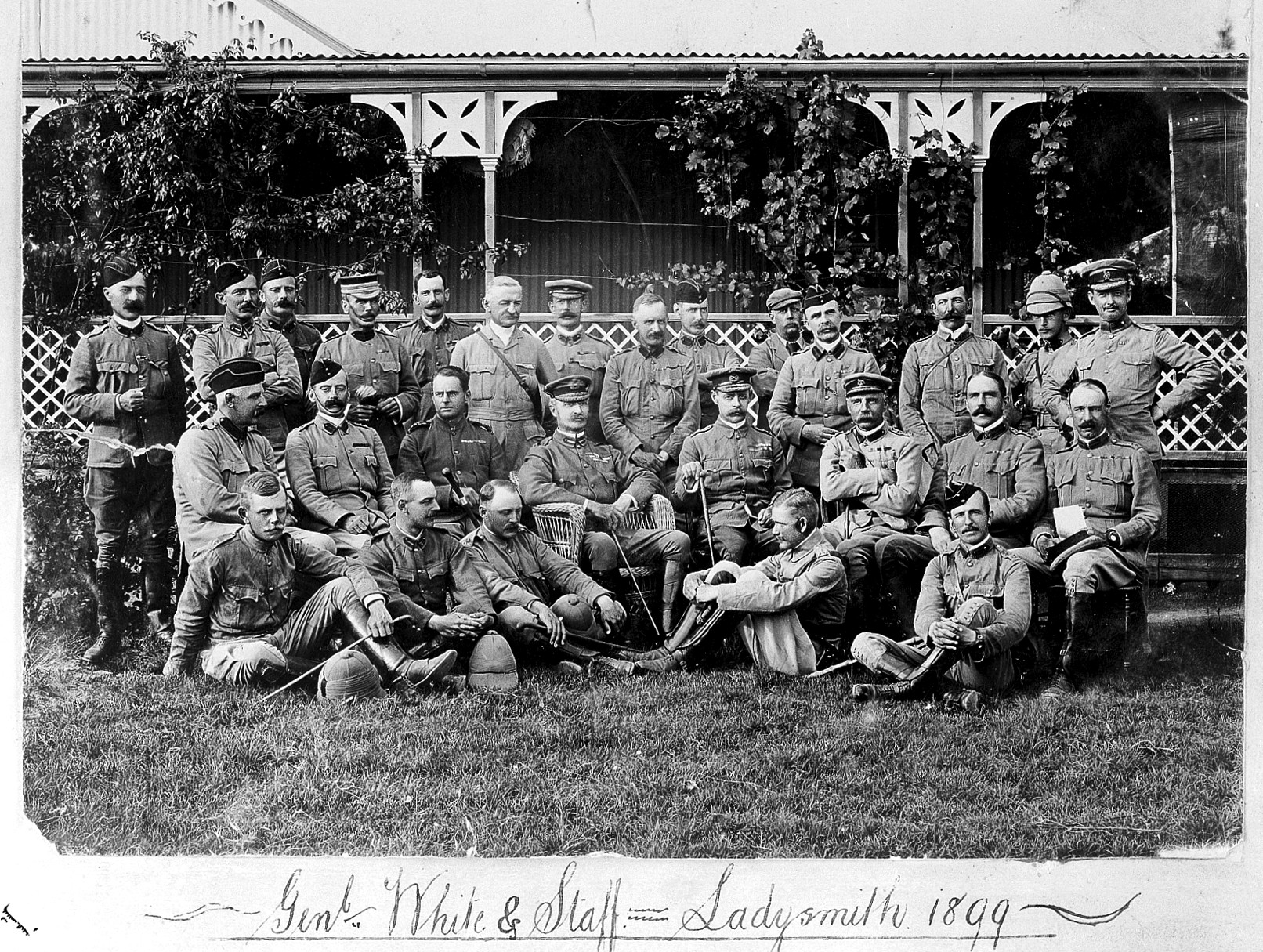
George White and staff in Ladysmith

White became commander of the forces in Natal in September 1899 shortly before the opening of the Second Boer War and fought at the Battle of Elandslaagte in October 1899. He then withdrew to Ladysmith where he took command of the garrison during the siege of Ladysmith with his aide-de-camp Clive Dixon (later portraying the siege in watercolour): when his position there became untenable he was instructed by General Sir Redvers Buller to destroy the guns and surrender the garrison on the best terms he could. White responded "I hold Ladysmith for the Queen" and held out for another four months before the town was relieved in late February 1900. His health greatly reduced, White left the city in early March to recover in more peaceful parts of the colony, before he left Cape Town for the United Kingdom on the SS Dunvegan Castle later the same month. There were thousands of people greeting him on his arrival in Southampton the following month, and the city gave him a formal welcome before he departed for London. For his service in the war he was appointed a Knight Grand Cross of the Order of St Michael and St George (GCMG) later that year, having earlier been made a Knight Grand Cross of the Royal Victorian Order (GCVO) in May 1900.

== Governor of Gibraltar and later life ==
White became Governor of Gibraltar in May 1900 and, in that role, was promoted to full general on 9 October 1900 and to field marshal on 8 April 1903. In 1905 he was appointed to a Commission of Inquiry into contracts placed with private contractors during the Second Boer War; he was appointed a Member of the Order of Merit later that year. He was Governor of the Royal Hospital Chelsea from 17 June 1905 until his death there on 24 June 1912. He was buried at Broughshane, a village in County Antrim, Northern Ireland. A statue of White is currently located at Portland Place, London, while the Sir George White Memorial Flute Band still operates in Broughshane, Ballymena.

White was also honorary colonel of the 2nd Volunteer Battalion the Prince Albert's (Somersetshire Light Infantry) and, later, of the Gordon Highlanders.

== Family ==
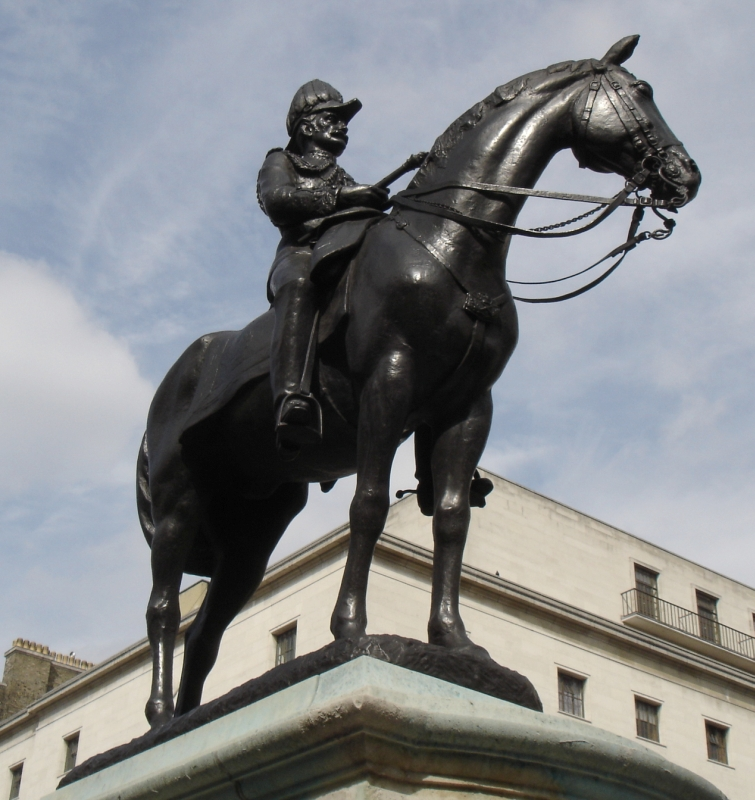
Statue of White in Portland Place, London

In 1874 White married Amelia Maria Baly, daughter of the Venerable Joseph Baly, Archdeacon of Calcutta, with whom he had one son and four daughters. James Robert (Jack) White, Rose Frances White, May Constance White (Currie), Amy Gladys Stuart White (Lady Napier) and Georgina Mary White. Lady White was invested as a Companion of the Imperial Order of the Crown of India (CI) by Queen Victoria at Windsor Castle on 6 March 1900. In the year after her husband's death their unoccupied house at Englefield Green was badly damaged by suffragette arsonists. Elsie Duval and Olive Beamish were the suspects.

Their son Jack White, after service in the British Army, became an Irish republican and socialist who co-founded the Irish Citizen Army along with James Connolly and James Larkin.

== Honours and awards ==
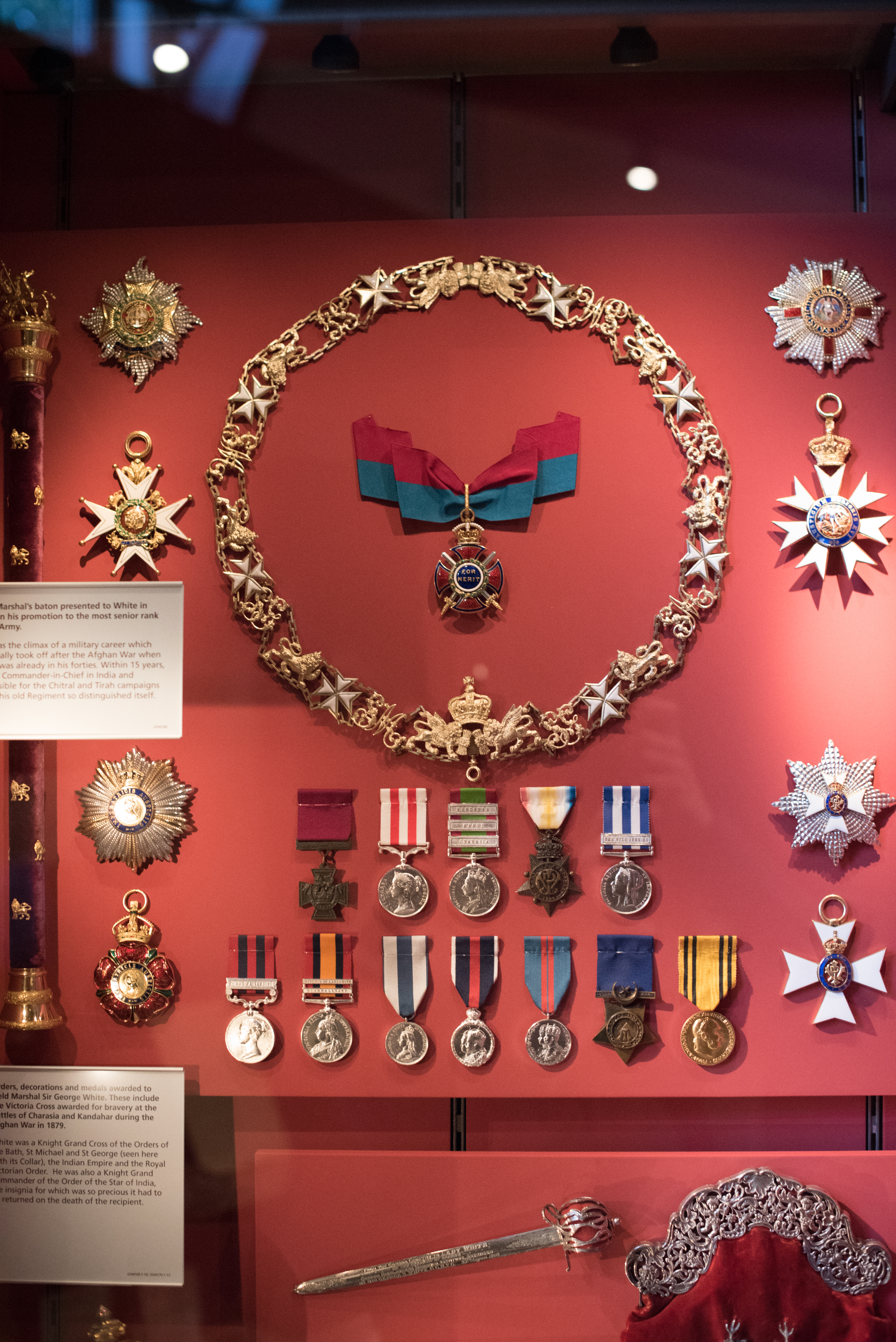
White's medals and honours displayed at the Gordon Highlanders Museum.

| Ribbon | Description | Notes |
| | Victoria Cross (VC) | 1879 |
| | Knight Grand Cross of the Order of the Bath (GCB) | 1897 |
| | Order of Merit (OM) | 1905 |
| | Knight Grand Commander of the Order of the Star of India (GCSI) | 1898 |
| | Knight Grand Cross of the Order of Saint Michael and St George (GCMG) | 1900 |
| | Knight Grand Commander of the Order of the Indian Empire (GCIE) | 1893 |
| | Knight Grand Cross of the Royal Victorian Order (GCVO) | 1900 |
| | Indian Mutiny Medal | |
| | Afghanistan Medal | Clasps: Kandahar, Kabul and Charasia. |
| | Kabul to Kandahar Star | |
| | Egypt Medal | Clasp: The Nile 1884-85 |
| | India General Service Medal (1854) | Clasp: Burma 1885-87 |
| | Queen's South Africa Medal | Clasps: Defence of Ladysmith, Elandslaagte |
| | Queen Victoria Diamond Jubilee Medal | |
| | King Edward VII Coronation Medal | |
| | King George V Coronation Medal | |
| | Khedive's Star | |
| | Bronze Jubilee Medal for Foreigners | Austria-Hungary 1908 |

Coat of arms of George White
| Notes Confirmed by Sir Arthur Vicars, Ulster King of Arms, 29 April 1905. Crest On a wreath of the colours a dexter arm embowed vambraced holding in the hand a sprig of three roses slipped seeded and leaved Proper and charged on the elbow with a four leaved shamrock slipped Gules. Escutcheon Per fess Argent and Gules in chief six roses three and three of the last barbed and seeded Proper and in base an eagle displayed Or. Motto Honeste Parta |

== Sources ==
- Durand, Henry Mortimer (1915). The Life of Field-Marshal Sir George White, V.C. Edinburgh, London: W. Blackwood. ISBN 978-1177733694.
- Heathcote, Tony (1999). The British Field Marshals 1736–1997. Pen & Sword Books Ltd. ISBN 0-85052-696-5.

Military offices
| Preceded by Sir Frederick Roberts | Commander-in-Chief, India; 1893–1898 | Succeeded by Sir Charles Nairne |
| Preceded by Sir Richard Harrison | Quartermaster-General to the Forces; 1898–1899 | Succeeded by Sir Charles Clarke |
Government offices
| Preceded by Sir Robert Biddulph | Governor of Gibraltar; 1900–1905 | Succeeded by Sir Frederick Forestier-Walker |
Honorary titles
| Preceded by Sir Henry Norman | Governor, Royal Hospital Chelsea; 1905–1912 | Succeeded by Sir Neville Lyttelton |
