= Lucas Johannes Meyer =

South African politician (1846–1902)

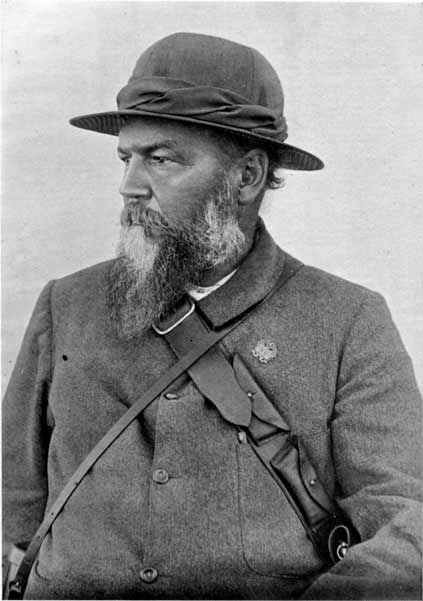
- Meyer during the Second Anglo-Boer War

1st President of the Nieuwe Republiek
- In office 16 August 1884 – 20 July 1888

Personal details
- Born: Lucas Johannes Meyer; 19 November 1846 Sand River, Transorangia
- Died: 8 August 1902 (aged 55) Brussels, Belgium
- Resting place: Vryheid, KwaZulu-Natal

Military service
- Allegiance: South African Republic
- Years of service: 1881, 1899–1902
- Rank: General
- Battles/wars: First Boer War: – Battle of Ingogo; Second Boer War: – Battle of Talana Hill – Battle of Vaal Krantz

Lucas Johannes Meyer (19 November 1846 – 8 August 1902), was a Boer general, member of the Transvaal government and president of the Nieuwe Republiek.

== Early life ==
Meyer was the eldest son of Izaak Johannes Meijer and his wife, Martha Maria Elizabeth Landman and the grandson of Lucas Johannes Meyer, a Voortrekker leader and member of the Volksraad of the Natalia Republic. As a young man, Meyer went to Natal and lived in Ladysmith and Newcastle, but in 1865 he settled in the Utrecht district in the South African Republic. In 1872 he was elected field cornet.

== Career ==
He strongly opposed the British annexation of the Transvaal. At the battle of Ingogo, during the First Anglo-Boer War he was badly wounded and unable to fight at the Battle of Majuba Hill. After the war, he served as magistrate of Utrecht from 1882 to 1884. In 1884 he became the district commandant and the leader of a group of Boers who assisted Prince Dinuzulu during the power struggle in Zululand, against his brother Zibhebhu. At the Battle of Tshaneni on 5 June 1884 Dinuzulu and his warriors, with the help of some 100 Boers, defeated Zibhebhu.

After the victory, Dinizulu handed a piece of land to the Boers as compensation for their assistance and Meyer played a leading role in the establishment of the Nieuwe Republiek on the land. In August 1884, he was appointed Commandant-General and Acting President and when his friend and confidant, Commandant-General Piet Joubert who had been elected president refused the appointment, Meyer became president. Meyer fought for the recognition of the Nieuwe Republiek, as the Republic was recognized only by the German Empire and the South African Republic. He then took a leading role in obtaining British permission for the incorporation of the Nieuwe Republiek into the South African Republic as the Vryheid district, which permission was granted in 1888.

In 1890, Commandant-General Joubert appointed Meyer as frontier commissioner of the Transvaal's southern border and he held office until he was elected the first member of the Volksraad for Utrecht in 1893 and in 1899, he became chairman of the Volksraad.

Meyer played an important role in Natal during the Second Anglo-Boer War as General of the southern commandos in the Transvaal and the various advances into Natal. He commanded the Boer forces attacking Dundee at the Battle of Talana Hill on 20 October 1899. However, due to illness, he was forced to leave the scene of fighting during the battle at Modderspruit on 30 October 1899 and command was taken over by General Louis Botha. Meyer returned to the battlefield and took part in the Battle of Vaal Krantz during February 1900 and also assisted with the occupation of Biggarsberg in May 1900.

Because of ill health, he was unable to take an active part during the latter part of the war and at the conclusion of the war, he became a member of the Executive Council, taking part in the peace conference and was one of the signatories of the Treaty of Vereeniging.

== Personal life and death ==
Meyer was a tall, powerfully built man, immensely popular and was commonly referred to as the 'Lion of Vryheid'. He was married twice, first to Margaretha Johanna van Niekerk and after her death in 1892, he married Petronella Burger. Three children were born from his first marriage. During a visit to Europe he died of heart disease in Brussels, Belgium. He was buried in the cemetery in Vryheid.
