= Northern Natal Offensive =

Major offensive of the Second Boer War

- Part of the Second Boer War
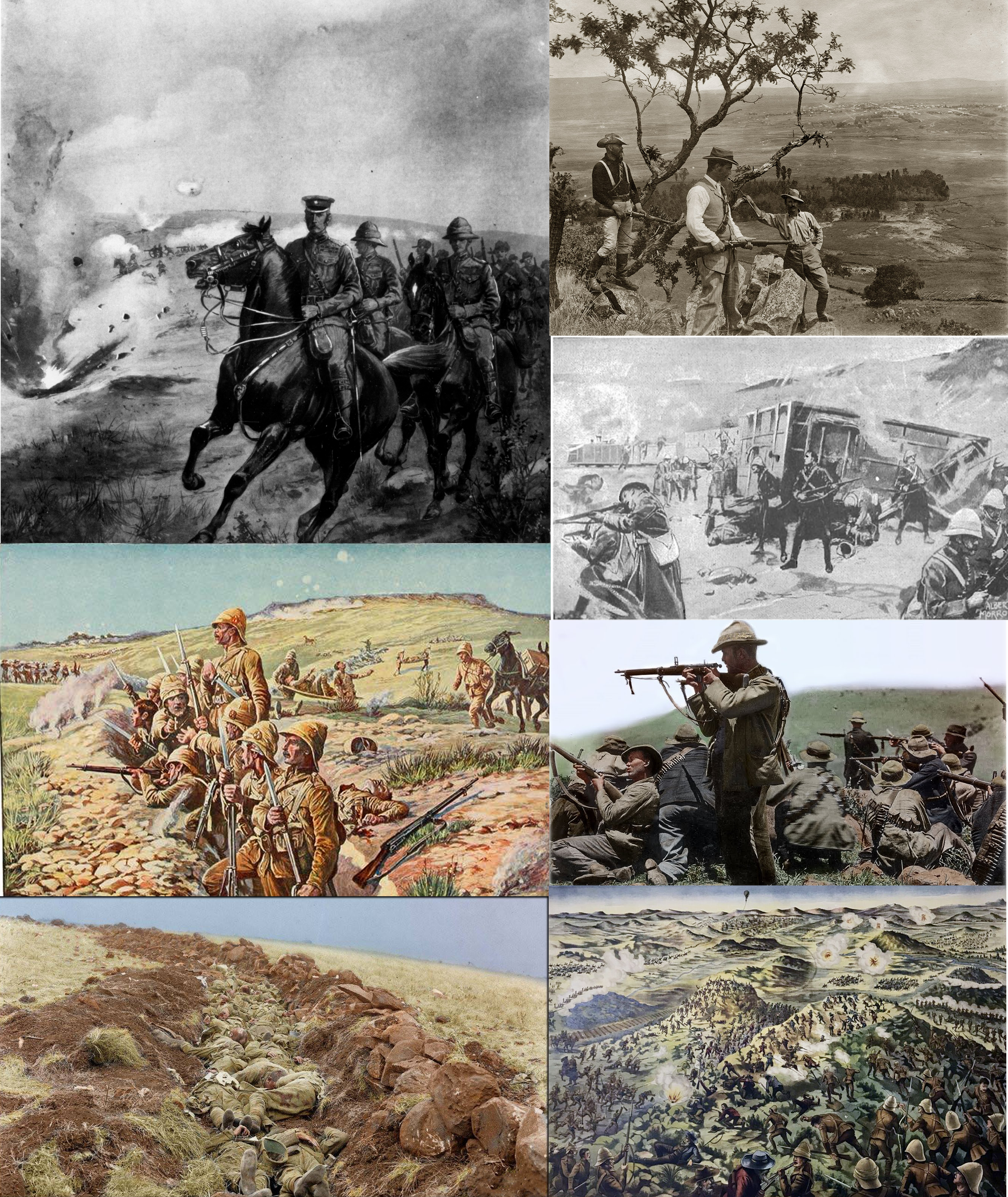
- Events of the Northern Natal Offensive. Clockwise from left: General White and his staff at the Battle of Elandslaagte; Boer troops atop Talana Hill; The Battle of Chieveley; Boers at the Second Battle of Colenso; The Battle of the Pieters; British dead at Spion Kop; The fighting at Wagon Hill.
Date	12 October 1899 – 10 June 1900
Location	Natal, South Africa
Result	British victory

Belligerents
British Empire	South African Republic; Orange Free State

Commanders and leaders
(United Kingdom of Great Britain and Ireland) Joseph Chamberlain (United Kingdom of Great Britain and Ireland) Lord Roberts (United Kingdom of Great Britain and Ireland) Redvers Buller (United Kingdom of Great Britain and Ireland) George White (United Kingdom of Great Britain and Ireland) William Symons (DOW) (United Kingdom of Great Britain and Ireland) Ian Hamilton (United Kingdom of Great Britain and Ireland) Walter Kitchener (United Kingdom of Great Britain and Ireland) John French (United Kingdom of Great Britain and Ireland) Aylmer Haldane	(South African Republic) Paul Kruger (South African Republic) Piet Joubert (South African Republic) Louis Botha (South African Republic) Lucas Meyer (South African Republic) Adolf Schiel (South African Republic) Sarel Oosthuizen (South African Republic) Camillo Ricchiardi (South African Republic) Schlak Burger (South African Republic) Johannes Kock † (Orange Free State) Christiaan de Wet (Orange Free State) Hendrik Prinsloo

Strength
October 1899: 22,000 troops December 1899: 32,000 troops (11,000 troops besieged at Ladysmith); February 1900: 60,000 troops	October 1899: 33,000 troops December 1899: 25,000 troops February 1900: 20,000 troops

Casualties and losses
9,509 total 2,276 killed 4,215 wounded 1,901 captured 1,117 missing	1,351 total 530 killed 620 wounded 91 captured 110 missing

The Northern Natal Offensive (12 October 1899 – 10 June 1900) was a military invasion of the Northern region of Natal by the Boers of the Transvaal and the Orange Free State during the Second Boer War. It was part of a larger offensive by the Boers into the British colonies, with other invasions occurring in Bechuanaland and the Cape Colony. The Boers invaded on 12 October, after Paul Kruger had declared war a day earlier. The Boers initially had success with this offensive, besieging Ladysmith, and reaching as far south as Estcourt in November 1899. The goal of the offensive for the Boers was to reach the port city of Durban and the capital of Pietermartizburg in order hopefully force the British into peace negotiations. However, with Redvers Buller's reinforcements arriving that same month, the Boers retreated to the Tugela River. Multiple attempts were made by Buller to relieve Ladysmith, but to no avail. However, the fourth attempt in February 1900 expelled the Boers from their position at the Battle of the Pieters. Scattered fighting from March-May 1900 continued, with the Boers being expelled from Natal completely at the Battle of Laing's Nek. With the Boers out of Natal, the offensive ended.

== Background ==
"If Mr. Chamberlain was really playing a game of bluff, it must be confessed that he was bluffing from a very weak hand."

— Arthur Conan Doyle, The Great Boer War - Chapter 4

The British and the Boers had been building up troops at the border between their two domains. Since June 1899, after the failure of the Bloemfontein Conference, Joseph Chamberlain and his aides had been gradually sending forces to Natal to reinforce the region, with a large military buildup occurring in September when reinforcements arrived from India. The hope was that the Boers would be deterred from the region due to the large military presence. The Natal Field Force, under the command of Sir George White, had been dispatched to Ladysmith if conflict broke between the Boers and the British. A garrison Force had been dispatched to Dundee under the command of Major-General Penn Symons in order to secure the railway lines. Kruger moved his commandos to the border. The position of Northern Natal was defined by a series of passes and hills, which would make easy for the Boers to invade, and throw up defensive positions, as they had done in the First Boer War.

The British forces in Natal numbered ~22,000, whilst the Boers held around 33,000 from both republics. De-escalation attempts were unsuccessful, and on 9 October, Kruger had sent an ultimatum to the British Government, asking them to remove all troops from Natal. The ultimatum arrived late, on 11 October, and was met with general ridicule. That same day, Kruger declared war, and President Steyn of the Orange Free State followed suit.

British Forces in Natal before 12 October 1899 (Dundee and Ladysmith)
Ladysmith Garrison
Artillery	Infantry	Cavalry
21st Battery	2nd Battalion Berkshire Regiment	5th Dragoon Guards
42nd Battery	1st Battalion Royal Munster Fusiliers	9th Lancers
53rd Battery	1st Battalion Manchester Regiment	19th Hussars
No. 10 Mountain Battery	1st Battalion Liverpool Regiment	Imperial Light Horse
	2nd Battalion Gordon Highlanders	
	1st Battalion Gloucestershire Regiment	
	1st Battalion Devonshire Regiment	
	Natal Mounted Police	
	Natal Carbineers	
Dundee Garrison
Artillery	Infantry	Cavalry
13th Battery	2nd Battalion King's Royal Rifle Corps	5th Lancers
67th Battery	2nd Battalion Dublin Fusiliers	18th Hussars
69th Battery	1st Battalion Royal Irish Fusiliers	
	1st Battalion Leicestershire Regiment	

== Early Offensive ==
"After a long ride we emerged into open country and there, winding across the plain ran the Buffalo River with the green hills and pleasant valleys of Natal stretching beyond."

— Deneys Reitz, Commando - Chapter 4

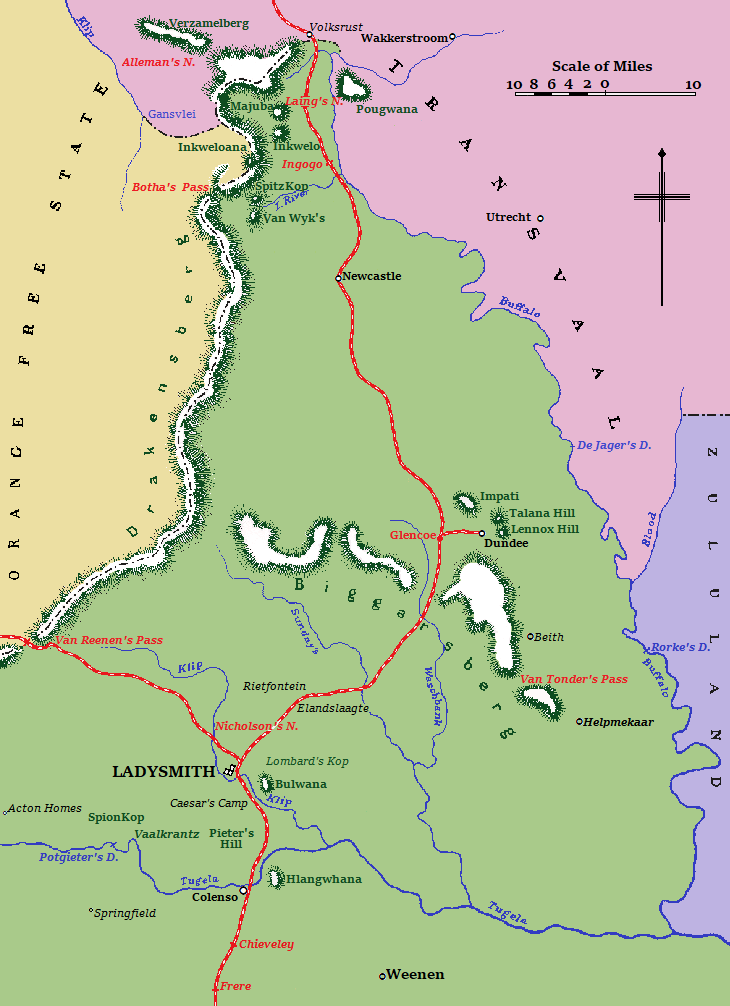
Map of Northern Natal, showing all sites of battle

The Boers, under the command of Piet Joubert, crossed the Buffalo River at Volksrust on 12 October, officially beginning the Offensive. By nightfall, they had reached a position outside of Newcastle. The British were concentrated at two positions. 4000 troops under William Penn-Symons were at Dundee, whilst the rest of the force was concentrated at Ladysmith. General White send out limited reconnaissance, but did not find the Boers. The Boers occupied Newcastle on 15 October, and they split into three main forces. The first Boer column headed towards Utrecht, the second column headed south along the railway, and the third headed for Dundee. On 18 October, General White's cavalry spotted the Boers on patrol, and on the night of 19 October, they were seen approaching Dundee.

=== Battle of Talana Hill ===
Date: 20 October 1899

A column of Boers under the command of Lucas Meyer moved towards Dundee, and occupied Impati Hill (around 6 miles northwest of Dundee). They then moved their artillery and infantry on Talana Hill, which overlooked the town of Dundee. The Boer guns now overlooked Dundee, and the British moved the 13th and 69th Batteries to fire on the hill. An artillery barrage ensues, with both sides firing on each other. At 7 AM, Penn-Symons ordered the infantry to assault the Boer position, and moved the 18th Hussars to the western side of the hill.

The 2nd Dublin Fusiliers, 2nd Rifles, and the 2nd Irish Fusiliers made up the assaulting infantry, while the 1st Leicester Regiment remained at Dundee to guard the camp. They advanced across the open grassland and began to ascend the hill; few casualties were taken at this point. The British then came across a wood that stretched across the bottom of the hill. At this point, the advance was halted, as the Boers poured intense fire on this position.

"An officer of Irish Fusiliers has narrated how, in trying to cut the straps from a fallen private, a razor lent [to] him for that purpose by a wounded sergeant was instantly shot out of his hand."

— Arthur Conan Doyle, The Great Boer War, Chapter 5 - Talana Hill

Penn-Symons, seeing the advance halt, decided to mount his horse and ride to Talana, in hopes of restarting the advance up the hill. The troops began to move behind him, with the advance slowly creeping up the hill. Penn-Symons, however, would be shot in the stomach and carried back to camp. He would later die of his wounds on 23 October. The advance restarted, and the British began making their way up Talana Hill. The 69th Battery laid down a heavy fire on the top, weakening the Boers. At this point, Meyer gave the order to retreat, and the British took the top of the hill. The 69th Battery, however, had accidentally hit British troops in the cross-fire, and therefore did not fire on the retreating Boers, for fear of once again hitting British troops. The 18th Hussars, under Col. Moller, attempted to pursue the retreating Boers, with little results.

The Battle of Talana Hill, whilst a British victory, did not halt the Boer advance. The other two columns began moving south, and the British had taken heavy casualties in comparison with the Boers.

=== Battle of Elandslaagte ===
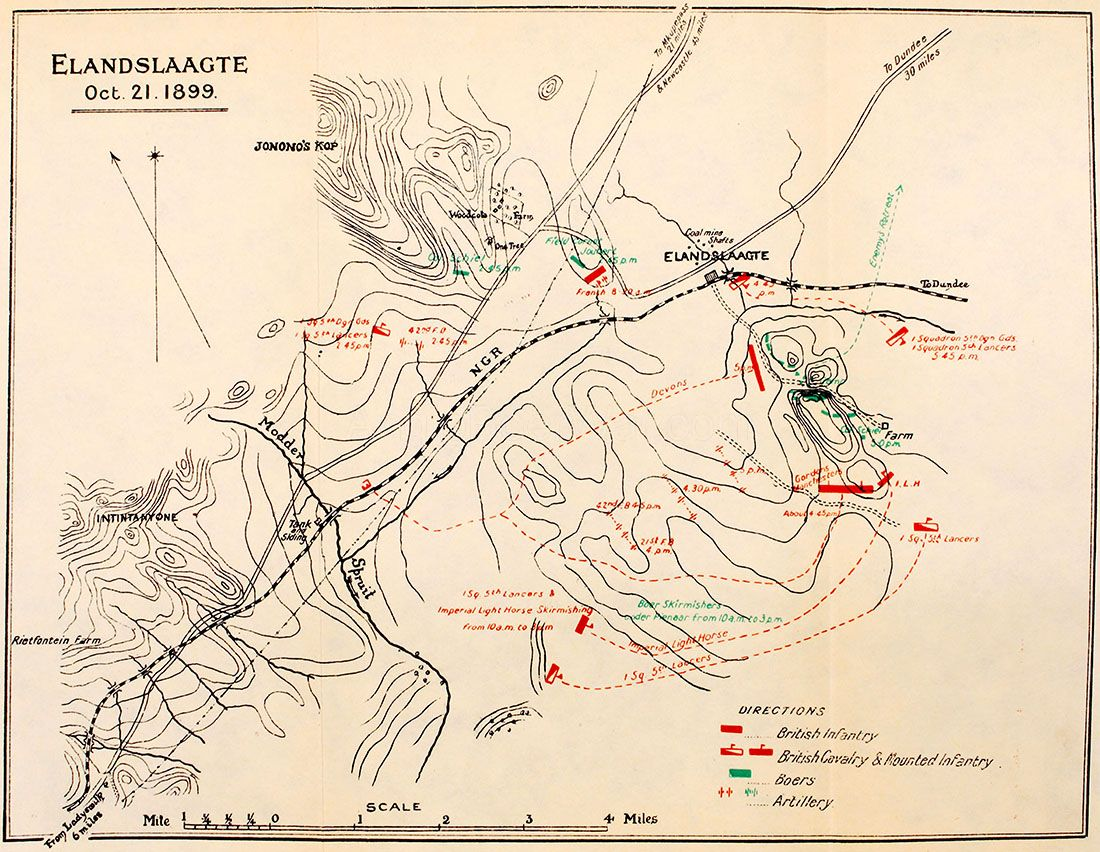
Map of the Battle of Elandslaagte

Date: 21 October 1899

Whilst Meyer's column had moved towards Dundee, another column led by General Johannes Kock moved south along the railway lines. On 19 October, his force occupied Elandslaagte railway station, and had established their camp on the hills outside the settlement. The Boers had now cutoff the British garrison at Dundee, as Elandslaagte lay in between Penn-Symon's force and White's main force at Ladysmith. His force consisted of the Johannesburg Commando and the German Volunteers, under the command of Colonel Adolf Schiel. General White decided that the Dundee garrison had to be relieved in order for them to retreat and join the main garrison at Ladysmith. On the evening 20 October, a reconnaissance force under Colonel John French scouted out the Boer position, and had returned on 21 October with a battery of the Natal artillery, five squadrons of the Imperial Horse, and half a battalion of the Manchester Regiment in an armored train. The Boers were reinforced that day, and French's force was outgunned. French's force moved up when it came into contact with a few Boer outposts. The Imperial Light horse engaged them, and the Natal artillery fired a few rounds at the railway station before retiring behind the Modder River (not to be confused with the Modder River in the O.F.S). French had decided to telegraph for reinforcements from Ladysmith.

At around midday, another force under the command of Ian Hamilton arrived from Ladysmith, comprising the 1st Devonshire Regiment, 2nd Gordon Highlanders, two squadrons of the 5th Lancers, the 5th Dragoon Guards, the 21st & 42nd R.F.A batteries. The British then decided to assault at around 1 o'clock, with the infantry assaulting both in the front and on the right flank. The Devons were to advance at 3 yards apart from each man, and companies to advance in wide order, as per the command of Hamilton. General White and his staff rode down from Ladysmith to view the action, but did not take away command from French. At this point, the Manchesters and the Gordons had begun flanking from the right, whilst the Devons advanced from the front. Once the Devons reached the base of the hills, they took cover and waited for the flanking attack to succeed. At around 4 o'clock, a rainstorm came over the battlefield, darkening it significantly whilst also halting the British advance. Eventually, the Gordons resumed their advance, along with the Manchesters. The Devons followed suit, and quickly charged at the Boer positions on the hilltop.

"Scotchman, Englishman, and British Africander keeping pace in that race of death. And now at last they began to see their enemy."

— Arthur Conan Doyle, The Great Boer War, Chapter 6, Part I - Elandslaagte

The Boers began to retreat further back, trying to take positions further on the hills, but to no avail. General Koch tried to lead a counterattack against the British forces, which almost succeeded, were it not for Ian Hamilton riding to the position of the Gordons and rallying them to advance. The Gordons launched an assault, with the rest of the infantry following, pushing the Boers off the hills. The cavalry then finished the job, with the 5th Lancers and 5th Dragoons encircling the retreating Boers. Elandslaagte was cleared of the Boers, and a pathway was open for the British at Dundee to retreat to Ladysmith.

General White then stationed a body of troops at Elandslaagte in order to secure the railway line from Dundee to Ladysmith. General Yule, who took command from Penn-Symons in Dundee after he was mortally wounded. However, it was discovered on 22 October that the Boers had occupied a position further south of Elandslaagte, threatening Ladysmith. White panicked, and hastily retreated back to Ladysmith. Yule and the Dundee garrison were forced to march south to Ladysmith without much cover.

=== Battle of Rietfontein ===
Date: 24 October 1899

Whilst the Boer advance at Elandslaagte had been halted, other columns still began moving south. Commandos from the Orange Free State, under the command of Christiaan de Wet, began moving along the mountain passes. They had reached around seven miles north of Ladysmith, and General White decided to try and repulse them from their position in order to prevent the Dundee garrison from being ambushed. On 24 October, White moved out from Ladysmith the 5th Lancers, 19th Hussars, 42nd battery, 53rd battery, 10th mountain battery, the Devons, Liverpools, Gloucesters, 2nd King's Royal Rifles, the Imperial Light Horse, and the Natal Volunteers, a force of ~4000 strong. The cavalry force was commanded by John French, and began to move along the railway towards Elandslaagte. The Boers opened fire from the north, on a mountain called 'Tinta Inyoni' by the Zulus. The artillery opened up on the Boer positions, and silenced the Boer guns. At 8 AM, the infantry began to advance, with the Gloucesters and Manchesters leading the advance, and the Devons supporting from the rear. The Gloucesters suffered heavy losses due to their advance in a more open position, compared to that of the Devons and Manchesters. The Boers were cleared from the hillside, and Yule's column was unmolested as it moved from Dundee, arriving on 26 October. With most of the NFF concentrated at Ladysmith, the Boers were able to move through Northern Natal, and move south. They swept through the countryside, and were virtually unmolested, save for the occasional British patrol.

"At the end of this first vigorous week of hostilities it is interesting to sum up the net result. The strategical advantage had lain with the Boers. They had made our position at Dundee untenable and had driven us back to Ladysmith. On the other hand, the tactical advantages lay with us. We had twice driven them from their positions. On the whole, the honours of that week's fighting in Natal may be said to have been fairly equal--which is more than we could claim for many a weary week to come."

— Arthur Conan Doyle, The Great Boer War, Chapter 6, Pt. II - Rietfontein

== Besieging of Ladysmith ==
"It was a grave thing to leave the town in order to give battle, for the mobile enemy might swing round and seize it behind us. Nevertheless White determined to make the venture."

— Arthur Conan Doyle, The Great Boer War - Chapter 7

=== Battle of Ladysmith ===
Date: 30 October 1899

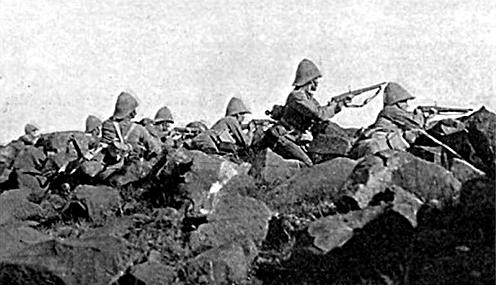
Devonshire Regiment at the Battle of Ladysmith

White and his troops were now concentrated at Ladysmith, with the Boers rapidly approaching the city. On 29 October, a reconnaissance balloon was sent out, and discovered the Boers approaching from the hills at the north. White decided to act. On 30 October, the Boers opened fire on the city. White then sent his forces out to engage the Boers, hoping to dislodge them from their positions. There were three main positions which had a high concentration of Boers. Farquhar's Farm, which lay to the northeast, Pepworth Hill, directly north of Ladysmith, and Nicholson's Nek, which was situated slightly northwest than the other positions. The main strategy was to use the tactics used at Elandslaagte, to use a frontal attack to draw the Boers' fire whilst the main infantry would flank from the sides. The British forces assaulted the hills, and on Pepworth hill they had considerable success. The Devons and Gloucesters constructed stone sangars (visible in the picture on the right). They began to fire on the Boers on the other side of the hill. The Royal Irish Fusiliers joined them as well. By afternoon, the ammunition for the troops was running low, and the troops were called to cease fire. The Irish Fusiliers were called to surrender, and many officers broke their swords in protest, as they had suffered few casualties. The force retreated, even though they had very few casualties. With Pepworth Hill abandoned, the other British positions followed. The Boers then began their encircling movement of Ladysmith, and some of the British forces were called to evacuate. White took full blame for the blunder, and prepared to entrench his forces on the outskirts of the city.

"Haggard officers cracked their sword-blades and cursed the day that they had been born. Privates sobbed with their stained faces buried in their hands. Of all tests of discipline that ever they had stood, the hardest to many was to conform to all that the cursed flapping handkerchief meant to them. 'Father, father, we had rather have died,' cried the Fusiliers to their priest."

— Arthur Conan Doyle, The Great Boer War, Chapter 7 - The Battle of Ladysmith

=== Siege of Ladysmith ===
Date: 1 November 1899 - 28 February 1900

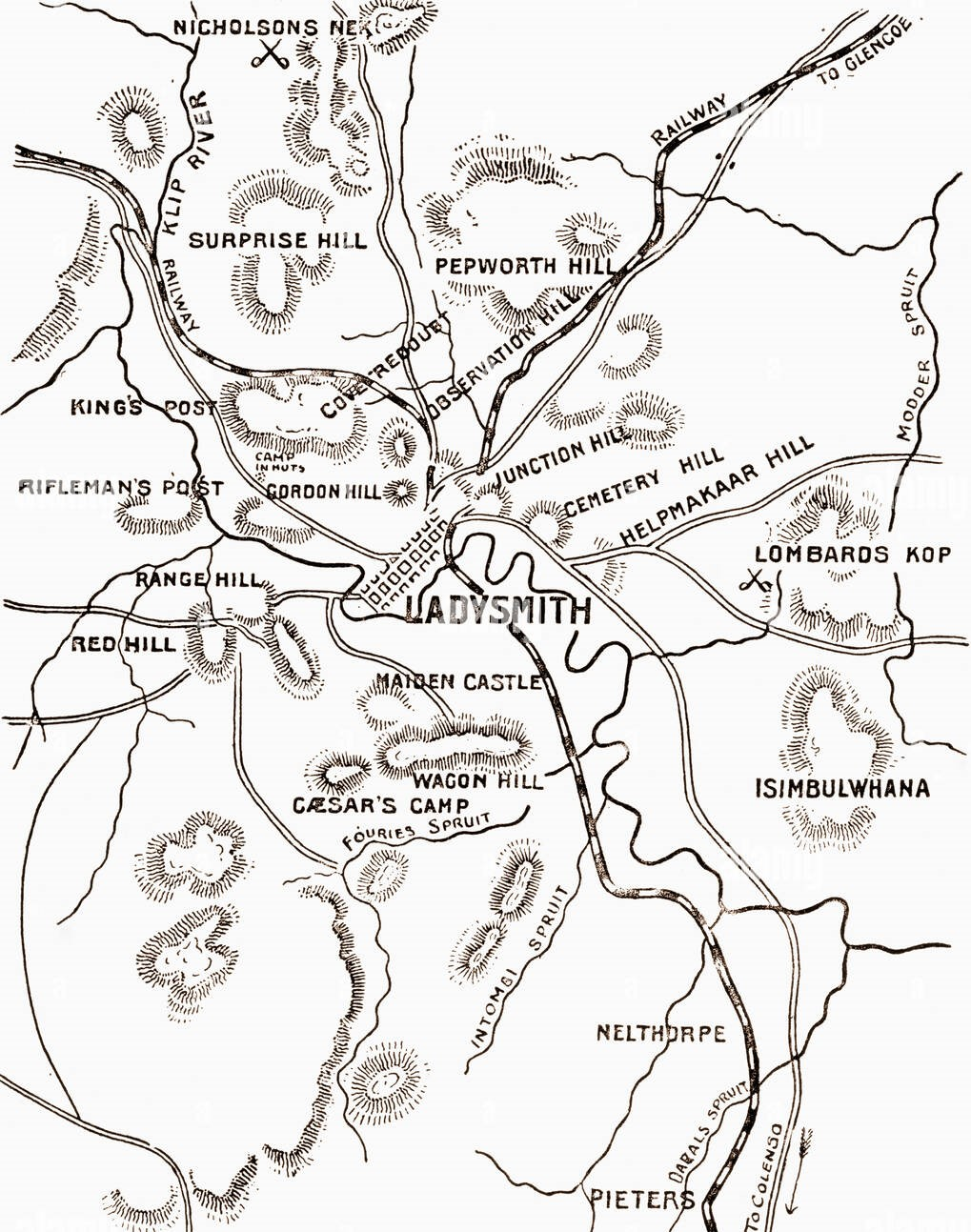
Positions at Ladysmith

After the disastrous Battle of Ladysmith, the Boers moved to besiege the town of Ladysmith. Citizens were evacuated out of the city, along with some regiments. Most, however, stayed in the city. On November 2, the last siege train moved out from the city, and the Boers completely surrounded the city. Naval guns from the HMS Terrible had arrived in Ladysmith for the British, and the Boer Long Tom (155mm Creusot Fortress gun) had arrived.

On the last day before the Boers completely surrounded the city, General French and White's Chief of Staff, Douglas Haig, were evacuated out by armored train. At this point, the Boers had trapped 11,000 British troops at Ladysmith. Artillery bombardments from both sides ensued, but the Boers did not launch any actual offenses to take the city in the year. The Boer advance south continued, however it slowed significantly due to a significant Boer force having to be dispatched to Ladysmith.

=== First Battle of Colenso ===
Date: 3 November 1899

With the Boers having laid Ladysmith under siege, and trapping most of the British force in Natal there, the remainder of the British forces began to move towards Estcourt. A small detachment of the Durban Light Infantry and a naval brigade from HMS Tartar had constructed fortifications at Colenso, acting as an outpost for the British forces in the area. On 3 November, the Boers moved their artillery to the heights to the north of Colenso. They began to open fire on the British position, with the British taking no cover as they had no artillery to counter. They hastily evacuated their positions after some time, and left before Boer infantry could take the town. These forces then moved to Estcourt, leaving the Tugela River undefended, allowing the Boers to set up defensive positions there.

=== Battle of Chieveley ===
Date: 15 November 1899

At this point, the Boers had advanced from Colenso, and under General Botha's strategy, split into two columns. It was decided that they would try to take Durban, which was only a mere 100 miles or so from them. At this point, all British forces were at Estcourt, and trenches were being dug in anticipation of a Boer attack. On 14 November, Colonel Charles J. Long received word that two Boers columns were headed towards them, with one heading for Weenen and the other for Estcourt. Long send out an armoured train on 15 November in order to look for these Boer forces. In command of the train was Aylmer Haldane, a Captain of the Gordon Highlanders, of which had been trapped at Ladysmith. On the train as well was war correspondent and future PM Winston Churchill. The train was ambushed after passing Frere Station, and was forced to surrender after a prolonged fight, with most of the troops being taken prisoner. The Boer advance into Natal continued, and Weenen was occupied later that week. The Boers began to move to the hills surrounding Estcourt, planning to bypass the town in order to head to Durban.

"Death stood before me, grim sullen Death without his light-hearted companion, Chance. So I held up my hand, and like Mr. Jorrocks's foxes, cried 'Capivy.'"

— Winston Spencer Churchill, London to Ladysmith via Pretoria, Chapter 7 - The Fate of the Armoured Train

=== Battle of Willow Grange ===
Date: 23 November 1899

The Boer advance into Natal continued south. Louis Botha, one of the generals in charge of the offensive, decided that it would be best to continue the push to Durban, much to the disapproval of the more cautious Piet Joubert. Nonetheless, Joubert gave Botha permission to continue the plan. On November 22, the Boers decided to head through the hills south of Estcourt to bypass the main British force located there. They then continued south, eventually situating themselves at Willow Grange. Willow Grange is a large hill which overlooks the railway line to Estcourt. The Boers situated themselves there, and the British forces learned of this. Colonel Walter Kitchener decided to move out from Ladysmith that night with a force of 2000 troops to dislodge the Boers from their position. They assaulted the next morning, 23 November, but a heavy thunderstorm delayed the British advance. The Boers took up a position behind the stone wall of a farm, and began to fire on the advancing British. Fire was exchanged on both sides, but the thunderstorm got worse. Multiple troops on both sides were struck by lightning, and the British advance was called off. The Boers then decided to retreat after the first 10,000 troops arrived in Mooi River on 24 November, part of Buller's reinforcements.

=== Buller's Reinforcements Arrive ===
From 24 November up to December, the British forces from Durban had begun to mass at Estcourt. A total of 33,000 troops amassed there, and General Buller arrived in Natal on 27 November. Buller moved the force up to Chieveley, establishing camp there. On 9 December, he cleared out the rest of the territory nearby, ensuring that the Boers stayed north of the Tugela River. Buller then stayed in Chieveley, and prepared to assault the Boer positions at the Tugela in order to relieve Ladysmith.

== Defense of the Tugela ==
=== Second Battle of Colenso ===
Date: 15 December 1899

With General Buller having arrived in Natal on 27 November, he began to amass his forces in preparation for an assault on the Boer defensive positions, in hopes of dislodging them to relieve the city of Ladysmith. After concentrating his forces thoroughly, he moved out his forces at daybreak on 15 December. The previous defeats of Stormberg on 10 December and Magersfontein on 11 December put pressure on Buller and his forces to succeed.

=== Battle of Wagon Hill ===
Date: 5 January 1900

=== Battle of Spion Kop ===
Date: 23-24 January 1900

After the Second Battle of Colenso, Buller reorganized his forces and went back to Chieveley

=== Battle of Vaal Krantz ===
Date: 5-7 February 1900

At this point, time was of the essence, and Ladysmith needed to be relieved

== Repulse from Ladysmith ==
=== Battle of Pieters Hill ===
Date: 14-27 February 1900

== Clearing of Natal ==
Date: 28 February - 10 June 1900
