= October 1899 =

Month of 1899

<<	October 1899					>>
Su	Mo	Tu	We	Th	Fr	Sa
1	2	3	4	5	6	7
8	9	10	11	12	13	14
15	16	17	18	19	20	21
22	23	24	25	26	27	28
29	30	31

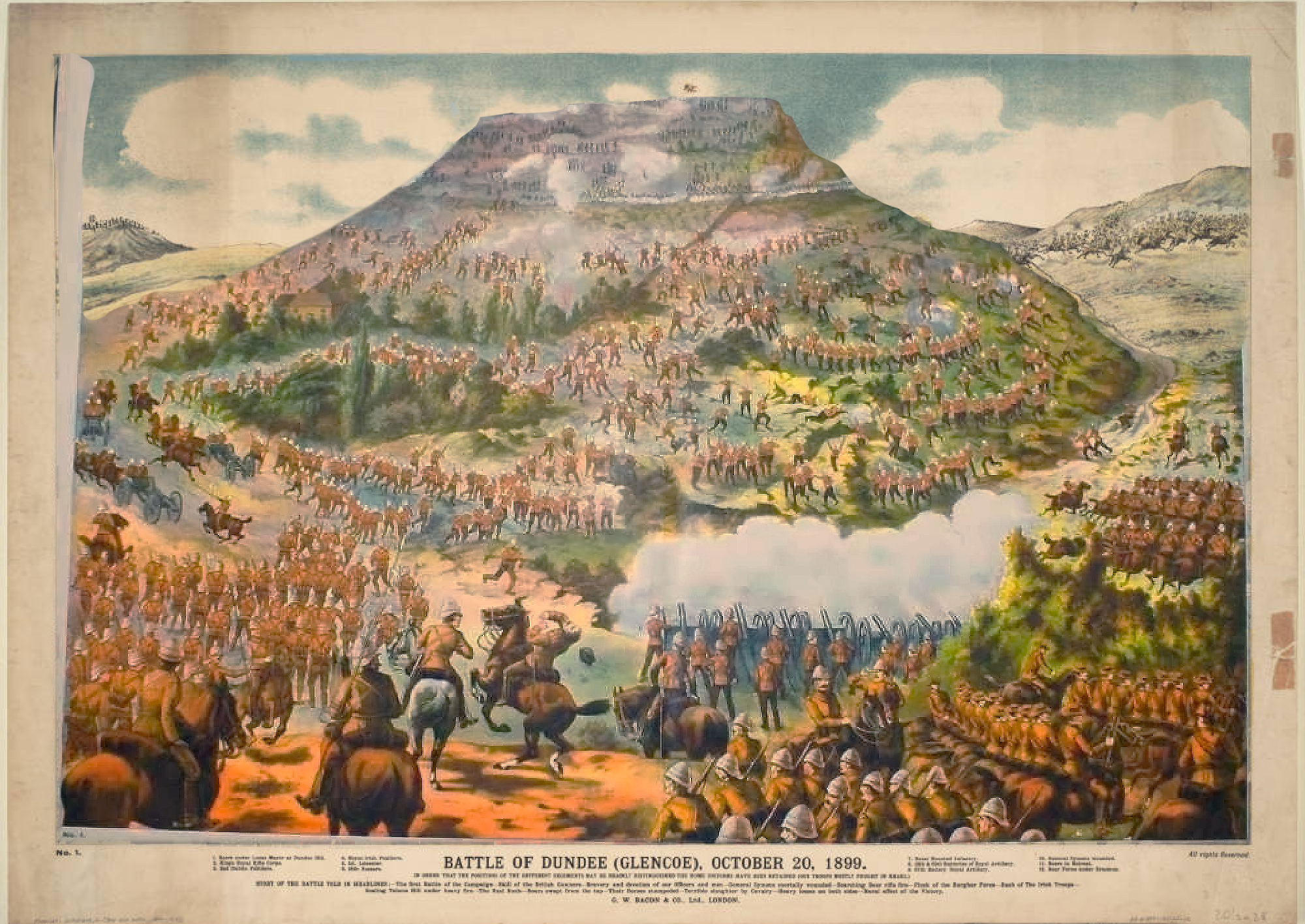
October 20, 1899: Battle of Talana Hill, the first major battle of the Second Boer War.

The following events occurred in October 1899:

== October 1, 1899 (Sunday) ==
- Possession of the Mariana Islands was formally transferred from Spain to Germany, which purchased the archipelago (with the exception of Guam) from Spain for 837,500 German gold marks. The islands became part of German New Guinea.
- Born: Ernest Haycox, American writer; in Portland, Oregon (d. 1950)

== October 2, 1899 (Monday) ==
- The Republic of Negros was declared on the Philippine island of Negros by a committee in Bacolod with approval by the U.S. Military Governor of the Philippines, General Elwell S. Otis, to be ruled jointly by a U.S. military governor appointed by General Otis, and a Philippine civil governor elected by registered voters in the Republic. The short-lived republic would exist until its annexation by the U.S. as a province of the islands.
- The London School of Hygiene & Tropical Medicine was established at the University of London by Sir Patrick Manson following a donation by the Indian philanthropist B. D. Petit.
- Bērnu Klīniskā Universitātes Slimnīca (BKUS, "Children's Clinical University Hospital"), a specialized children's hospital in Latvia, was established in Riga by a wealthy industrialist, James Armiststead.
- Died:
  - Emma Hardinge Britten, 76, British writer and Spiritualist
  - Percy Pilcher, 32, British aviation pioneer and glider pilot, died of injuries sustained in a glider accident on September 30.

== October 3, 1899 (Tuesday) ==
- The boundary dispute between Venezuela and British Guiana was resolved by a binding award from the International Tribunal of Arbitration of five neutral jurists agreed upon by the United Kingdom and the United Venezuelan States.
- Born: Gertrude Berg, American actress; in New York City (d. 1966)

== October 4, 1899 (Wednesday) ==
- With the Second Boer War and invasion of the British Cape Colony and the Colony of Natal in South Africa, the British Governor of Swaziland (now the Kingdom of Eswatini) issued an order for "all white inhabitants" and British subjects to evacuate, with the exception of men eligible for military service. British citizens, along with some South African civilians, were escorted to the Swaziland border with the Portuguese colony of Mozambique.
- Born: Franz Jonas, President of Austria from 1965 to 1974; in Floridsdorf, Austria-Hungary (d. 1974)

== October 5, 1899 (Thursday) ==
- The Federal State of the Visayas, formed 10 months earlier as a state of the First Philippine Republic founded by the nationalist leader Emilio Aguinaldo, came to an end with its formal annexation by the Republic.
- The song cycle Sea Pictures, opus 37, composed by Edward Elgar from five poems by different authors (starting with "Sea Slumber Song" by Roden Noel), was performed for the first time, premiering at the Norfolk and Norwich Festival.
- Born:
  - Marcus Wallenberg Jr., Swedish banker and CEO of Stockholms Enskilda Bank; in Stockholm (d. 1982)
  - George, Duke of Mecklenburg, head of the House of Mecklenburg-Strelitz; at Oranienbaum, Russia (d. 1963)

== October 6, 1899 (Friday) ==
- French opera singer Charles Dalmorès (Henri Alphonse Brin) made his operatic debut, appearing in the title role of the Richard Wagner opera Siegfried at the Théâtre des Arts in Rouen. Specializing in French language roles, he would be celebrated in Europe and in the United States on both the state and as a recording artist until his retirement in 1918.
- Born: Ivor McIntyre, English-born Royal Australian Air Force pilot and the first person (along with Stanley Goble) to circumnavigate Australia by air; in Kent (killed in plane crash, 1928)

== October 7, 1899 (Saturday) ==
- Four companies of the Loyal North Lancashire Regiment of the British Army, commanded by Lieutenant-Colonel Robert Kekewich and assigned to protect the Empire's Cape Colony, arrived in Kimberley at the request of the De Beers diamond company and the municipality's citizens. Five days later, the Boer Army arrived on the outskirts of the city and began bombardment on October 14.
- Died: Deodato Arellano, 55, Filipino propagandist and revolutionary who founded the Katipunan guerrillas, died of tuberculosis.

== October 8, 1899 (Sunday) ==
- The South African Republic telegraphed a three-day ultimatum to the United Kingdom, demanding an arbitration of issues and a pullback of troops from the borders between the Republic and the adjoining Cape Colony, Natal and Bechuanaland by October 11.

== October 9, 1899 (Monday) ==
- Born: Bruce Catton, American Civil War historian, winner of the Pulitzer Prize for History; in Petoskey, Michigan (d. 1978)

== October 10, 1899 (Tuesday) ==
- The French Sudan was divided into two smaller administrative units, Middle Niger (which later became the nations of Niger and Gambia) and Upper Senegal (which became the nations of Senegal and Mali).

== October 11, 1899 (Wednesday) ==
- In South Africa, the Second Boer War between the United Kingdom and the Boers of the Transvaal and Orange Free State began as the Boers invaded the British colony of Natal. The war would last for more than two and one half years until the surrender of both republics on May 31, 1902, and their subsequent annexation as British colonies.

== October 12, 1899 (Thursday) ==
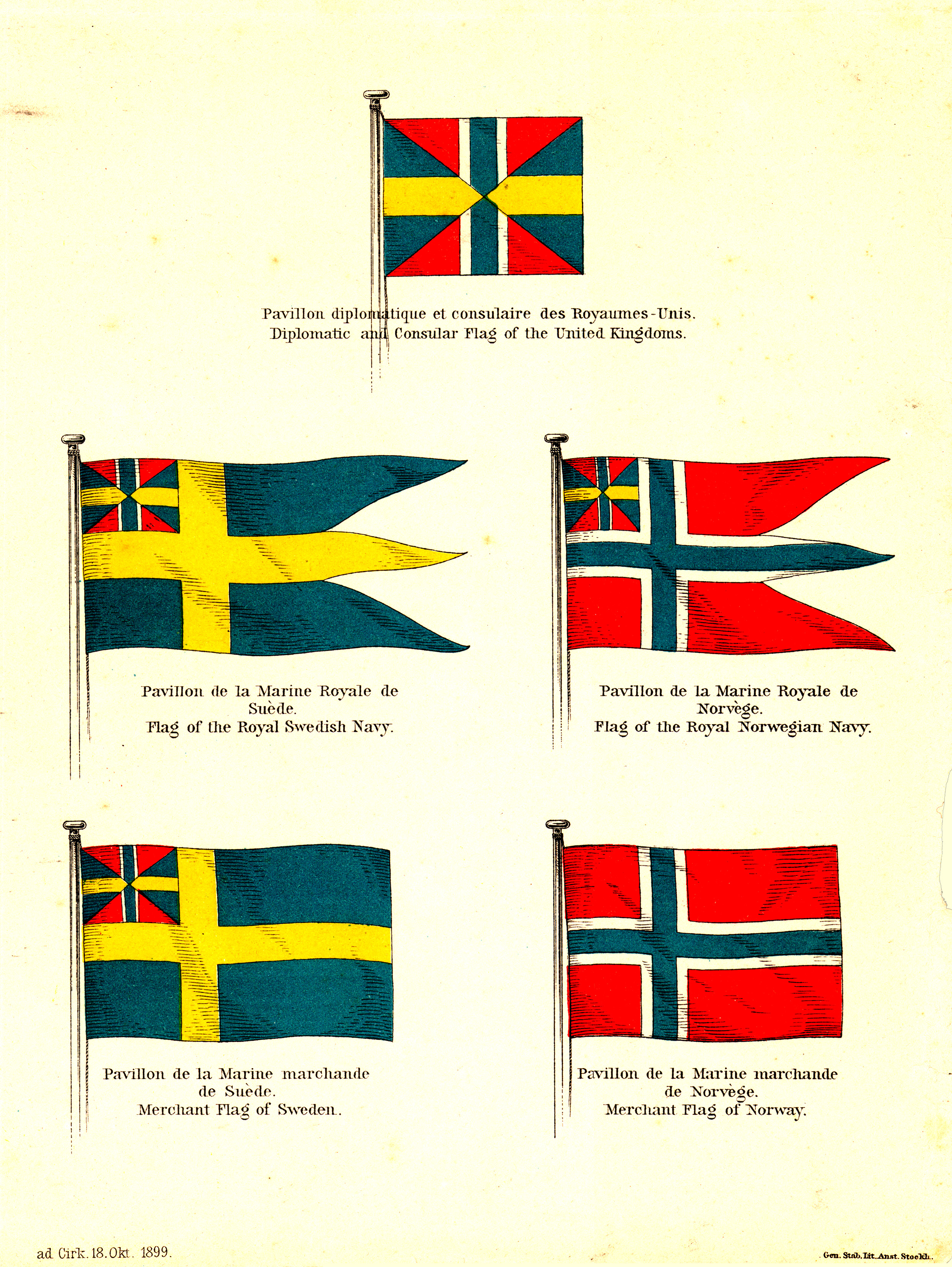
Norway's flag before and after the removal of the unionsmerket

- Symbolic of the gradual separation of Norway from its union with Sweden, the "union mark" (unionsmerket) was removed from a Norwegian flag for the first time since the Sweden and Norway had a set of common flags, starting with the flag used by merchant ships. King Oscar II, in his capacity as King of Norway, had vetoed the first two attempts by Norway's parliament, the Storting, but under the union's constitution, the removal from the merchant flag became effective upon its passage by the Storting for the third time. The union mark would be taken off of the Norwegian navy flag on June 9, 1905, and off of all flags in Sweden and Norway by November 1, 1905.
- The Battle of Kraaipan began in South Africa as the Boers attacked the city in Britain's Cape Colony. On the first day of the attack by General Koos de la Rey, the British armoured train Mosquito was derailed, and the British surrendered the following day.
- Elliott Lewis became the Premier of Tasmania (a self-governing British colony that would join in the founding of Australia in 1901) after the government of Premier Edward Braddon lost a vote of confidence.

== October 13, 1899 (Friday) ==
- The Second Boer War extended into the British Bechuanaland Protectorate (modern-day Botswana) as the siege of Mafeking began in Britain's Cape Colony in South Africa. The siege, initiated by the Boer General Piet Cronjé and defended by Robert Baden-Powell, would last more than seven months until May 17, 1900, when a column of 2,000 British Army soldiers, commanded by Colonel B. T. Mahon, came to the rescue.

== October 14, 1899 (Saturday) ==
- The Boer invasion of the Cape Colony began with the siege of Kimberley.

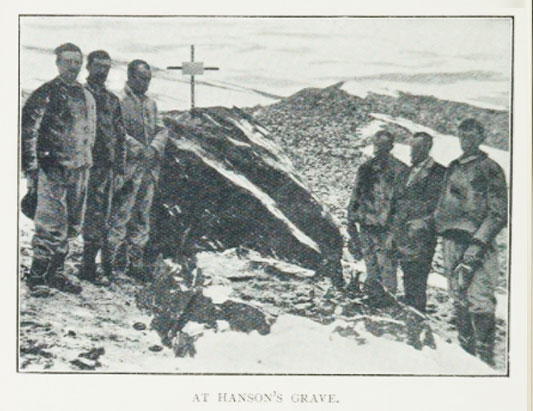
Crew of the Southern Cross Expedition at Nicolai Hanson's grave

- Died:
  - Nicolai Hanson, 29, Norwegian zoologist and Antarctic explorer, a member of the Southern Cross Expedition, died in Antarctica and became the first person to be buried there.
  - Anna Cabot Quincy Waterston, 87, American diarist

== October 15, 1899 (Sunday) ==
- The 1899 Major League Baseball season ended after six months, with the Brooklyn Superbas (now the Los Angeles Dodgers) finishing in first place of the 12-team National League, with a record of 101 wins and 47 losses, eight games ahead of the 95-57 Boston Beaneaters (now the Atlanta Braves). Brooklyn had effectively clinched the pennant on October 7 with a 13 to 2 win over the New York Giants, putting it seven games ahead with only six games left to play.
- French Army officer and explorer Ferdinand de Béhagle, aged 42, was put to death by Sudanese warlord Rabih az-Zubayr, prompting a French expedition against Rabih.

== October 16, 1899 (Monday) ==
- In England, the musical comedy A Chinese Honeymoon, produced by lyricist George Dance with music by Howard Talbot, premiered at the Theatre Royal in Hanley, now part of Stoke-on-Trent in Staffordshire. The first musical to run for 1,000 performances, it would open at the Royal Strand Theatre in London for the first of 1,075 performances on October 5, 1901, and at the Casino Theatre on Broadway on June 2, 1902.
- Died:
  - Edward Orton Sr., 70, American geologist and educator who served as the first president of Ohio State University from its opening on September 17, 1873, as the Ohio Agricultural and Mechanical College
  - Ludwig Zottmayr, 71, German bass-baritone singer known for appearing in the premiere of Richard Wagner's Tristan und Isolde on June 10, 1865.

== October 17, 1899 (Tuesday) ==
- The Thousand Days' War began in Colombia as Colombian Liberal Party soldiers led by General Rafael Uribe Uribe, with support from Venezuela, began a fight against the government of National Party president Manuel Antonio Sanclemente. The war would continue for 1,130 days.

== October 18, 1899 (Wednesday) ==
- The Boxer Rebellion began in China as the Battle of Senluo Temple was fought between more than 4,000 Imperial Chinese Army troops and at least 1,000 rebels from the Society of Righteous and Harmonious Fists.

== October 19, 1899 (Thursday) ==
- Boer troops commanded by Johannes Kock captured the railway station in Elandslaagte and cut the telegraph line between the British Army headquarters at Ladysmith and its station at Dundee.
- 17-year-old Robert H. Goddard received his inspiration to develop the first rocket capable of reaching outer space, after viewing his yard from high in a tree and imagining "how wonderful it would be to make some device which had even the possibility of ascending to Mars, and how it would look on a small scale, if sent up from the meadow at my feet."
- Born: Miguel Ángel Asturias, Guatemalan writer, Nobel Prize laureate; in Guatemala City (d. 1974)

== October 20, 1899 (Friday) ==
- In the first major clash of the Second Boer War, the Battle of Talana Hill, the British Army drove the Boers from a hilltop position, but with heavy casualties, including their commanding general Sir Penn Symons, who would die on October 23.

== October 21, 1899 (Saturday) ==
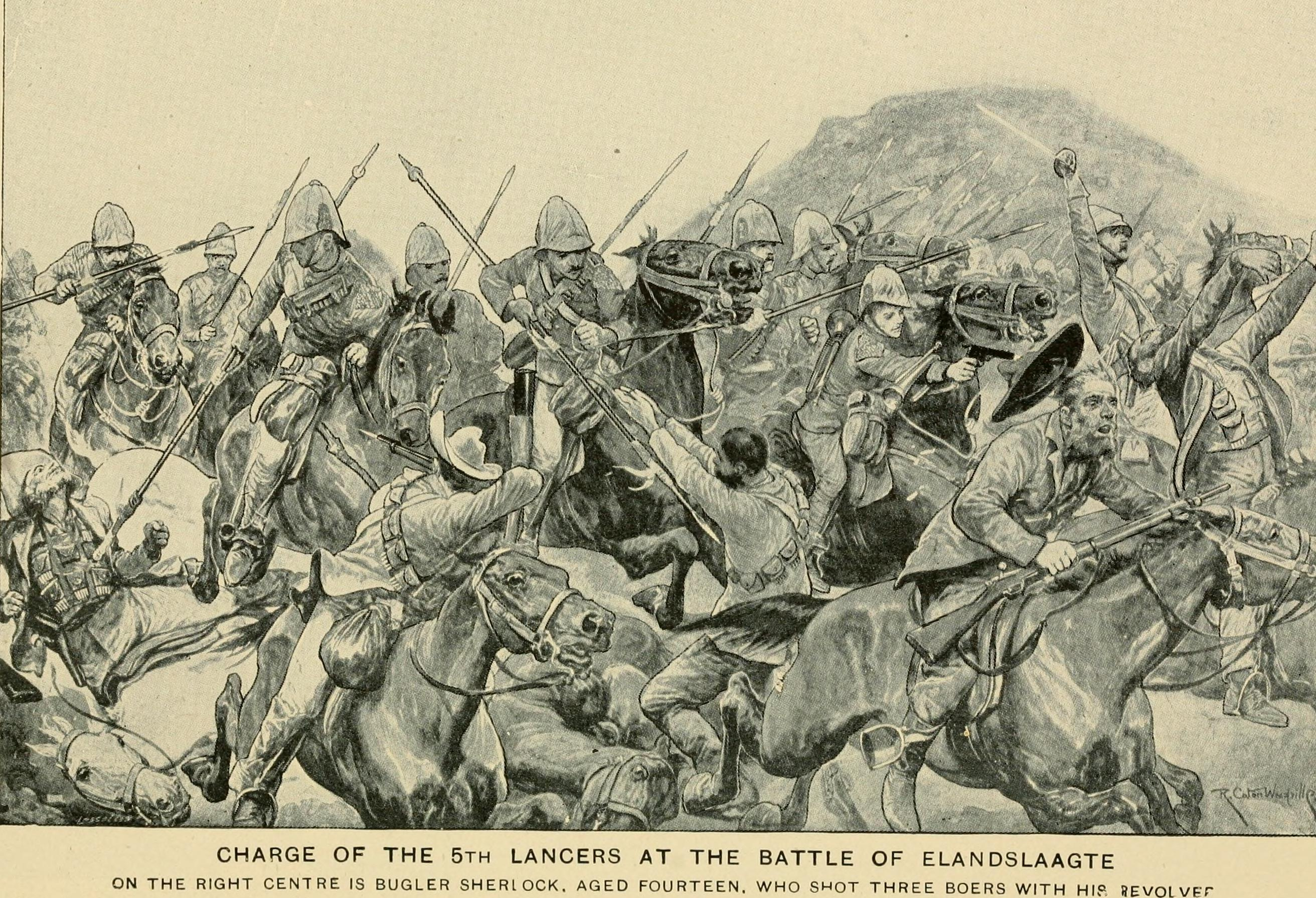
Charge of the 5th Lancers at the Battle of Elandslaagte

- The Battle of Elandslaagte was fought in Natal, as the British Army recaptured the railway station from the Boers, then proceeded toward the fortress of Ladysmith. South African General Jan Kock was fatally wounded in the battle and would die 10 days later.
- Died: Herman Coster, 34, Dutch lawyer and State Attorney of the Zuid-Afrikaansche Republiek, was killed in action at the Battle of Elandslaagte.

== October 22, 1899 (Sunday) ==
- Died: Ella Brockway Avann, 46, American educator, died after experiencing convulsions.

== October 23, 1899 (Monday) ==
- Died: Lieutenant-General Sir William Penn Symons KCB, 56, British Army officer, died of wounds sustained at the Battle of Talana Hill on October 20.

== October 24, 1899 (Tuesday) ==
- President Martinus Theunis Steyn of the South African Republic proclaimed the annexation of the northern portion of the Cape Colony above the Vaal River.
- The sinking of the ship Cisneros by the Colombian Navy warship Hércules drowned more than 200 Liberal rebels during the Battle of Magdalena River.
- Born: László Bíró (born László József Schweiger), Hungarian inventor of the ballpoint pen; in Budapest (d. 1985)

== October 25, 1899 (Wednesday) ==
- Dr. Benjamin Ide Wheeler was inaugurated as president of the University of California.
- Died:
  - Grant Allen, 51, Canadian science writer and novelist, died of liver cancer.
  - Peter Mitchell PC, 75, Canadian lawyer, shipbuilder, politician and Father of Confederation

== October 26, 1899 (Thursday) ==
- The foundering of the British steamer Zurich off the coast of Norway killed 16 of the 17 crew aboard, with only the captain surviving.

== October 27, 1899 (Friday) ==
- Died:
  - Florence Marryat, 66, British author and actress, died of diabetes and pneumonia.
  - Guy Vernor Henry, 60, American military officer, Medal of Honor recipient and former military governor of Puerto Rico, died of pneumonia.

== October 28, 1899 (Saturday) ==
- Died:
  - Ottmar Mergenthaler, 45, German-American inventor of the linotype machine, died of tuberculosis.
  - John Codman Ropes, 63, American military historian and lawyer

== October 29, 1899 (Sunday) ==
- The Battle of Kouno ended after two days in Chad, as French Army Captain Émile Gentil led a force of 344 troops against a much larger force of Sudanese Arabs, led by the warlord Rabih az-Zubayr. Gentil routed the Sudanese.
- Born: Akim Tamiroff (born Hovakim Tamiryants), Armenian actor; in Tiflis or Baku, Russian Empire (d. 1972)

== October 30, 1899 (Monday) ==
- The Battle of Ladysmith began as British troops at the Ladysmith fort attempted to make a preemptive strike against a larger force of South African Republic and Orange Free State troops who were gradually surrounding the fort. After sustaining 400 casualties and having 800 men captured, the British retreated back to the fort where a 118-day siege would begin on November 2.
- Died:
  - Sir Arthur Blomfield ARA FRIBA, 70, British architect
  - William H. Webb, 83, American industrialist and philanthropist

== October 31, 1899 (Tuesday) ==
- Died:
  - Johannes Hermanus Michiel Kock, 64, Boer general and politician, died of wounds sustained at the Battle of Elandslaagte on October 21.
  - Anton Berindei, 61, Wallachian-born Romanian general and politician
  - Henry A. Neely, 69, second bishop of Maine in the Episcopal Church
