= New South Wales Citizens Bushmen =

- Active: 1900–1901
- Country: New South Wales
- Allegiance: British Empire
- Type: Mounted Infantry
- Engagements: Second Boer War

The New South Wales Citizens Bushmen was a mounted infantry regiment of the Colony of New South Wales which was raised in 1900 and served in the Second Boer War.

== South African service ==
The regiment left Sydney on 28 February 1900, aboard the Atlantian and Maplemore, arriving in Cape Town on 2 April, then onto Biera, disembarking on 12 April and marched to Bulawayo, Rhodesia.

The regiment's A Squadron and Headquarters participated in the relief of Mafeking in May and the relief of Rustenburg in July. The regiment's B, C, and D Squadrons, took part in the action at Koster's River on 22 July, attempting to relieve the Elands River garrison, which included A Squadron.

In 1901 the regiment operated in the Transvaal region and the advance on Pietersburg. On 11 May, the regiment disembarked in Sydney.

The regiment received the battle honour South Africa 1899–1902. Members of the regiment received one Companion of the Order of St Michael and St George, 4 Distinguished Service Orders and 3 Distinguished Conduct Medals as part of their actions in the Second Boer War.

== Commanding officers ==
- Henry Parke Airey
- James Francis Thomas
