= Adolf Schiel =

German officer and writer (1858–1903)

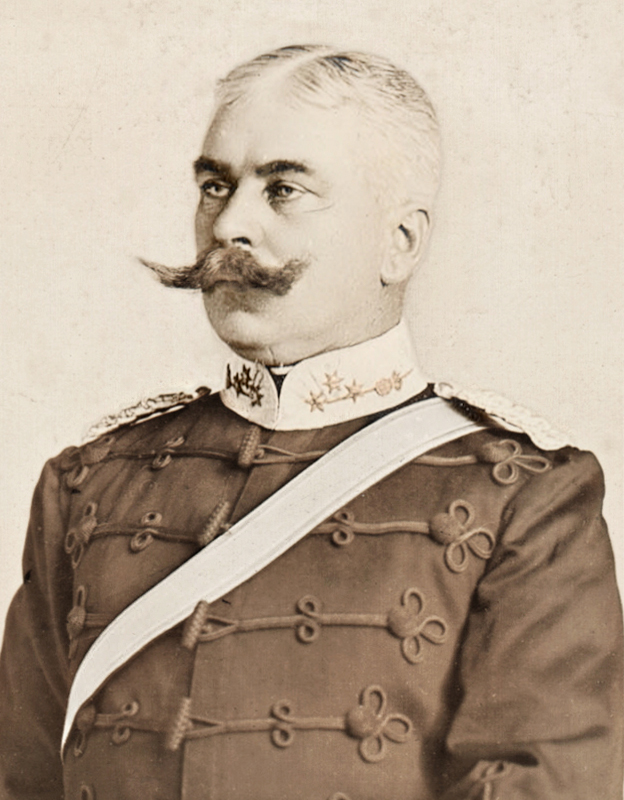
- Adolf Schiel photographed by Jan van Hoepen
- Born: 19 December 1858; Frankfurt-am-Main, Germany
- Died: 8 August 1903 (aged 44); Bad Reichenhall, Germany
- Occupations: Farmer, Soldier

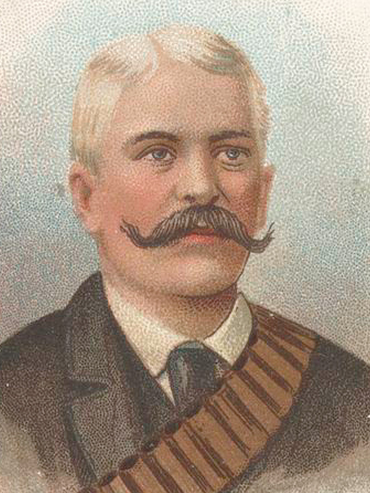
A trade card depicting Colonel Schiel

Adolf Friedrich Schiel (19 December 1858 – 8 August 1903) was an officer in the South African Republic's military forces during the Anglo-Boer war of 1899-1902.

== Biography ==
Born in Frankfurt-am-Main on 19 December 1858, Schiel was conscripted into the Prussian Army, serving as a cavalry trooper. He came to the South African Republic in 1878, settling in Natal. There, he took up farming and was later appointed head of the prisons service. In 1898 he was commissioned a lieutenant colonel and charged with supervising construction of a fortress adjacent to Johannesburg Prison. On the eve of war Schiel was given permission to form a Boer Commando composed, primarily, of his former prisons staff. Schiel was wounded and taken prisoner during the Battle of Elandslaagte on 20 October 1899. He returned to Germany following the war where he published his autobiography, 23 Jahre Sturm und Sonnenschein in Südafrika ("23 Years of Storm and Sunshine in South Africa"), and later died on 8 August 1903 in Bad Reichenhall of the wounds he had received at Elandslaagte.

== Legacy ==
- NSG Colonel Schiel, a noted shooting club in Frankfurt named after Schiel.
