= Rustenburg Commando =

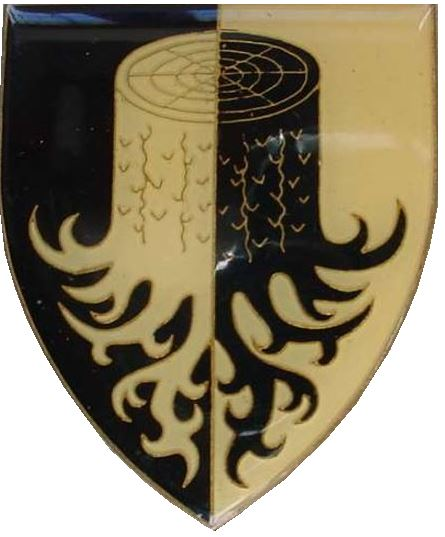
- Rustenburg Commando emblem
- Country: South Africa
- Allegiance: (South African Republic) Zuid Afrikaanse Republiek; Union of South Africa; Republic of South Africa; Republic of South Africa
- Branch: South African Army; South African Army
- Type: Infantry
- Role: Light Infantry
- Size: One Battalion
- Part of: South African Infantry Corps; Army Territorial Reserve, Group 19
- Garrison/HQ: Rustenburg
- Motto: Ex populo pro popula (Out of the people for the people)

Rustenburg Commando was a light infantry regiment of the South African Army. It formed part of the South African Army Infantry Formation as well as the South African Territorial Reserve.

== History ==
=== Origin ===
This commando was mustered in the Anglo Boer War Period.

=== Operations ===
==== With the Zuid Afrikaanse Republiek ====
===== Anglo Boer War =====
This Commando engaged in operations served at:

- Kimberley,
- Siege of Mafeking,
- Bechuanaland destroying a railway line,
- Kraaipan,
- Vaalkrans and
- Pieters Hill.

==== With the UDF ====
By 1902 all Commando remnants were under British military control and disarmed.

By 1912, however previous Commando members could join shooting associations.

By 1940, such commandos were under control of the National Reserve of Volunteers.

These commandos were formally reactivated by 1948.

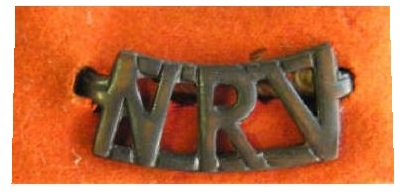
UDF era National Reserve of Volunteers shoulder tab

===== 1914 Rebellion =====
During the Maritz Rebellion, members served on both the side of the government and the insurrection.

===== World War 1 =====
Commando members served in German South West Africa.

==== With the SADF ====
During this era, the unit was mainly involved in area force protection, cordones and search operations assisting the local police and stock theft control.

The unit resorted under the command of Group 19.

===== Colours =====
The unit received its colours on 20 August 1982 from the then vice State President, Mr A.L. Schlebush.

These colours were eventually laid up at the museum at Infantry School in Oudtshoorn in 2007.

==== With the SANDF ====
===== Disbandment =====
This unit, along with all other Commando units was disbanded after a decision by South African President Thabo Mbeki to disband all Commando Units. The Commando system was phased out between 2003 and 2008 "because of the role it played in the apartheid era", according to the Minister of Safety and Security Charles Nqakula.

== Unit Insignia ==
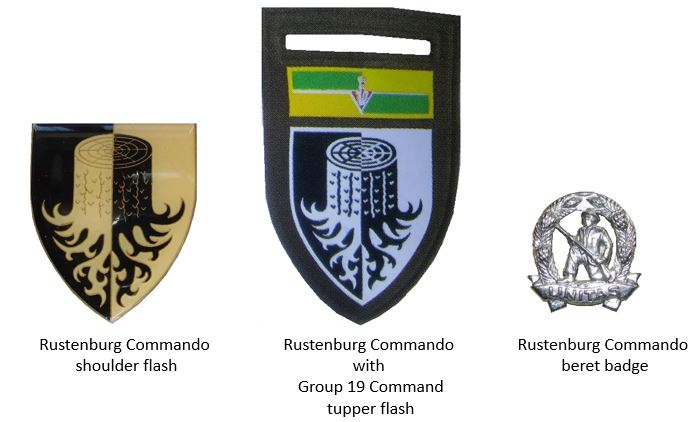
SADF era Rustenburg Commando insignia

== Leadership ==
Leadership
From	Honorary Colonels	To	Ribbon
	No known incumbents		
From	Commanding Officers	To	Ribbon
	No known incumbents		
From	Regimental Sergeants Major	To	Ribbon
	No known incumbents		

- Commandant P.S. Steenkamp 1900
- Lt Col Gerhard Malan 2005

== See also ==
- South African Commando System
