= Johannes Hermanus Michiel Kock =

Boer general and politician (1835–1899)

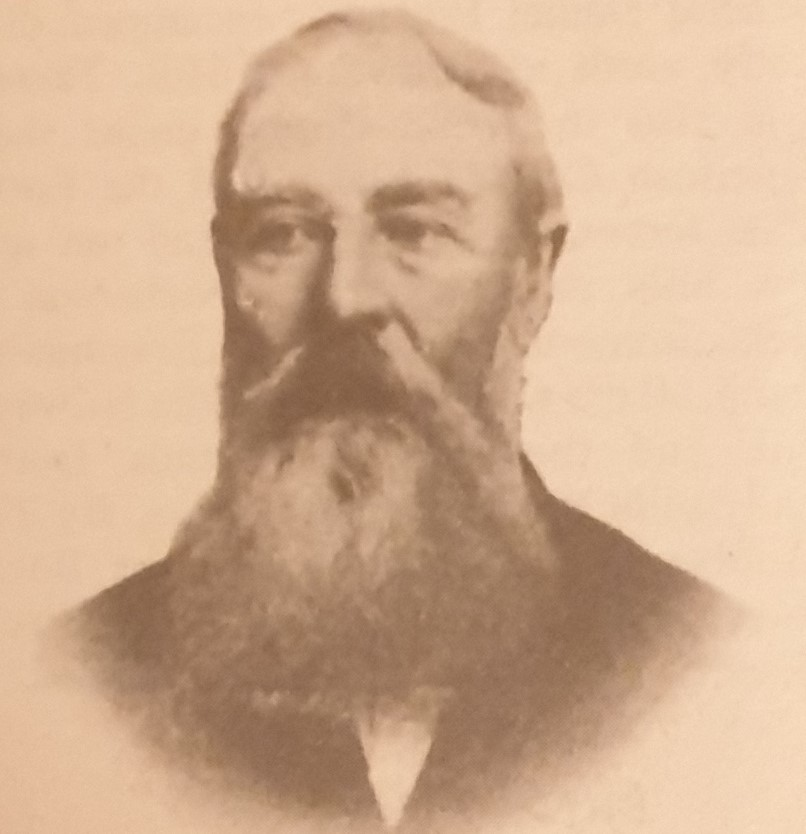
- Born: 11 March 1835; Graaff-Reinet, Cape Colony
- Died: 31 October 1899 (aged 64); Ladysmith, Colony of Natal
- Spouse: Catharina Christina Susanna Schoeman
- Military career
- Allegiance: South African Republic
- Rank: General
- Commands: South African Republic
- Conflicts: Battle of Boomplaats of 1848; First Boer War; Second Boer War: –Battle of Elandslaagte †
- Other work: farmer, landdrost

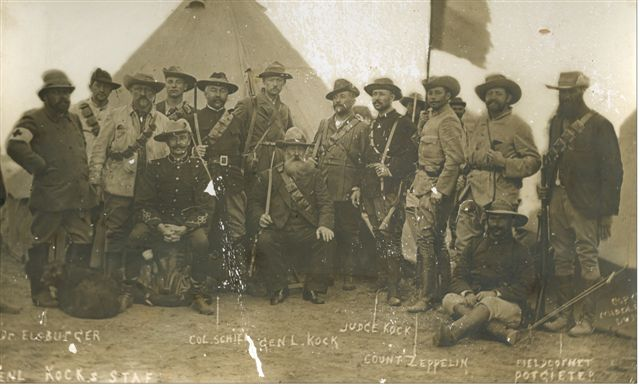
General Kock with his personal staff.

Johannes Hermanus Michiel 'Jan' Kock (11 March 1835 – 31 October 1899) was a Boer general and politician.

== Life ==
Kock was born in Graaff-Reinet the son of Johannes Lambertus Kock and Elsje Magdalena Smit. His father was a Boer commandant in Transorangia during the last phase of the Great Trek. His mother was the sister-in law of former president M.W. Pretorius. He travelled in the Great Trek with his parents and already at the age of 10 he accompanied his father at the Battle of Swartkoppies and at age 13 at the Battle of Boomplaats.

After the battle of Swartkoppies the family settled in Winburg and after Boomplaats, Kock and his father were declared outlaws and the family had to leave Winburg and crossed Vaal River and later settled on the farm, Witstinkhoutboom, in the Potchefstroom district. Kock bought this farm from his father in 1889.

At the age of 20 he married Catharina Christina Schoeman on 15 Jul 1854 at Potchefstroom. She was the daughter of Commandant-general Stephanus Schoeman and sister of General Hendrik Schoeman.

As an adult he was a landdrost in Potchefstroom and representative for that district in the Volksraad (the parliament of the South African Republic). He was also involved in church affairs and was largely responsible for the adoption of policies stating that Protestant ministers be paid from state funds. During the First Boer War he distinguished himself as a general in the fighting at Potchefstroom in 1880–1881.

== Second Boer War ==
With the outbreak of the war he was placed in charge of the Johannesburg commando and the German Corps. He invaded Natal and was instructed to blow up the railway lines but did not follow instructions exactly. Instead, he occupied a railway station at Elandslaagte which led to the Battle of Elandslaagte on 21 October 1899. Under his command the Boers lost the battle and Kock was wounded and captured by the British. He died a few days later from his wounds in Ladysmith in the Colony of Natal.

== Sources ==
- Encyclopedia of Southern Africa. Eric Rosenthal. 1967.
- The Hall Handbook of the Anglo Boer War. Darren Hall. 1999. ISBN 978-0-86980-943-3
