= The Great Boer War =

1900 book by Arthur Conan Doyle

- Author: Arthur Conan Doyle
- Language: English
- Subject: Second Boer War
- Published: London
- Publisher: Smith, Elder & Co
- Publication date: 1900
- Publication place: United Kingdom
- Text: The Great Boer War at Wikisource

The Great Boer War is a non-fiction work on the Boer War by Arthur Conan Doyle and first published in 1900 by Smith, Elder & Co. By the end of the war in 1902 the book had been published in 16 editions, constantly revised by Doyle. The Introduction describes the book as:

A very thorough account, including tables at the end of those killed or wounded up until the 8th September when he left South Africa. This account is compiled with as much accuracy as was attainable at this date, and with as much detail as a single volume will permit. In frequent conversations with Boers, Conan Doyle has endeavoured to get their views upon both political and military questions. Often the only documents he had to consult were the convalescent officers and men under his care, therefore some errors may have crept in. The closing scenes of the Boer War have necessarily been treated with less detail than the earlier.

The book was completed in September 1900, when the British believed that the war had finished. However, the war continued until 1902.

== Contents ==
- Chapter 1. The Boer Nations.
- Chapter 2. The Cause of Quarrel.
- Chapter 3. The Negotiations.
- Chapter 4. The Eve of War.
- Chapter 5. Talana Hill.
- Chapter 6. Elandslaagte and Rietfontein.
- Chapter 7. The Battle of Ladysmith.
- Chapter 8. Lord Methuen's Advance.
- Chapter 9. Battle of Magersfontein.
- Chapter 10. The Battle of Stormberg.
- Chapter 11. Battle of Colenso.
- Chapter 12. The Dark Hour.
- Chapter 13. The Siege of Ladysmith.
- Chapter 14. The Colesberg Operations.
- Chapter 15. Spion Kop.
- Chapter 16. Vaalkranz.
- Chapter 17. Buller's Final Advance.
- Chapter 18. The Siege and Relief of Kimberley.
- Chapter 19. Paardeberg.
- Chapter 20. Roberts's Advance on Bloemfontein.
- Chapter 21. Strategic Effects of Lord Roberts's March.
- Chapter 22. The Halt at Bloemfontein.
- Chapter 23. The Clearing of the South-East.
- Chapter 24. The Siege of Mafeking.
- Chapter 25. The March on Pretoria.
- Chapter 26. Diamond Hill—Rundle's Operations.
- Chapter 27. The Lines of Communication.
- Chapter 28. The Halt at Pretoria.
- Chapter 29. The Advance to Komatipoort.
- Chapter 30. The Campaign of de Wet.
- Chapter 31. The Guerilla Warfare in the Transvaal: Nooitgedacht.
- Chapter 32. The Second Invasion of Cape Colony.
- Chapter 33. The Northern Operations from January to April 1901.
- Chapter 34. The Winter Campaign (April to September 1901).
- Chapter 35. The Guerilla Operations in Cape Colony.
- Chapter 36. The Spring Campaign (September to December 1901).
- Chapter 37. The Campaign of January to April 1902.
- Chapter 38. De la Rey's Campaign of 1902.
- Chapter 39. The End.
