= Elandslaagte =

- Location within KwaZulu-Natal Location within South Africa
- Coordinates: 28.408°S 29.958°E
- Country: South Africa
- Province: KwaZulu-Natal
- District: Uthukela
- Municipality: Alfred Duma
- Time zone: UTC+2 (SAST)
- PO box: 2900

Elandslaagte is farming and coal-mining centre some 26 km north-east of Ladysmith. Afrikaans for 'elands flat', it was the scene of the Battle of Elandslaagte, one of the first battles of the Second Anglo-Boer War, on 21 October 1899. Monuments have been erected to the fallen on both sides, including the Dutch Corps Monument. The Dutch Corps Monument was destroyed in 2014.
