= Lord Gifford =

Lord Gifford may refer to:

- Adam Gifford, Lord Gifford (1820–1887), Scottish advocate and judge, Senator of the College of Justice
- One of the Barons Gifford:
  - Robert Gifford, 1st Baron Gifford (1779–1826), English lawyer, judge and politician, Master of the Rolls from 1824 to 1826
  - Robert Gifford, 2nd Baron Gifford (1817–1872)
  - Edric Gifford, 3rd Baron Gifford (1849–1911), English recipient of the Victoria Cross
  - Edgar Gifford, 4th Baron Gifford (1857–1937)
  - Anthony Gifford, 6th Baron Gifford (born 1940), English barrister, campaigner for reparations for slavery

== See also ==
- Baron Gifford
