= Claude Dansey =

British intelligence officer and assistant chief of MI6 (1876–1947)

Colonel, Sir Claude Dansey KCMG
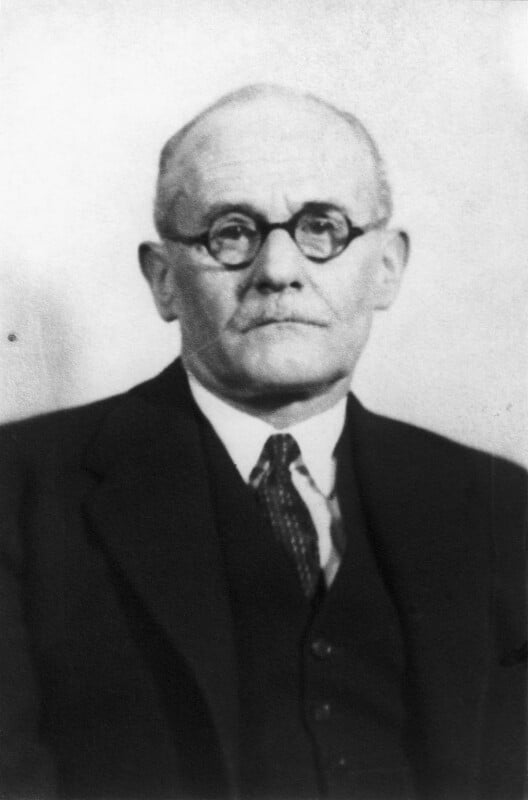

Assistant Chief of the Secret Intelligence Service
- In office 1939–1945
- Appointed by: Stewart Menzies

Director of the Z Organisation
- In office 1936–1939
- Appointed by: Stewart Menzies

Passport Control Officer for Rome
- In office 1929–1935
- Appointed by: Hugh Sinclair

Personal details
- Born: 10 September 1876 South Kensington
- Died: 11 June 1947 (aged 70) Bath, Somerset
- Resting place: Arnos Vale Cemetery, Gloucestershire
- Spouses: Pauline Monroe Cory Ulman (m. 1915); Frances Gurney Rylander (m. 1945)
- Education: Wellington College; English College
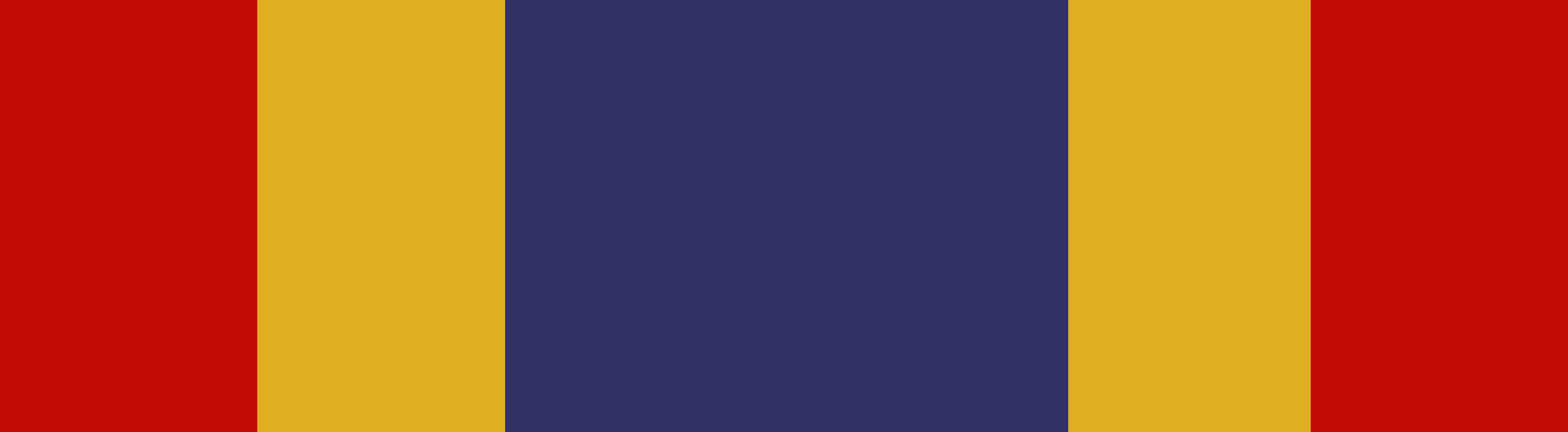
- Awards

Military service
- Branch/service: British South African Police; Gifford's Horse; British North Borneo Constabulary; South African Light Horse; International Squadron
- Rank: Colonel
- Battles/wars: Second Matabele War; Siege of Bulawayo; Mashonaland War; Cretan Revolt; North Borneo Punitive Expeditions; Mat Salleh Rebellion; Boer War; Relief of Mafeking; Northern Natal Offensive; Battle of Laing's Nek; Anglo-Somali War; Irish Revolutionary Period; World War I; World War II
- Codenames: Z; Colonel Z; Haywood; Uncle Claude

Claude Edward Marjoribanks Dansey, (10 September 1876 – 11 June 1947), also known as Colonel Z, Haywood, Uncle Claude, and Z, was a British police constable, soldier, and intelligence officer who served in several foreign wars for the British government. Despite having served HM in intelligence duties on every continent before the First World War – North Borneo, Mexico, Cape Colony, the United States, and Canada, among others – he is most well-known as the creator of the interwar Z Organisation, later becoming the Assistant Chief of the Secret Intelligence Service (SIS or MI6) during the Second World War. He was also a member of the London Controlling Section. He began his career in intelligence in 1895, and remained active until his death.

Many of the staff at OSS/London felt that he was anti-American, but he was one of the few men directly responsible for the creation of the American intelligence system itself, and counted among his closest friends William J. Donovan, Allen Dulles and Ralph Van Deman. Some of his female coworkers felt that he was misogynistic because he would not hire many female agents, but the first female he ever sent undercover, Edith Cavell, was tortured and killed, and he felt shame about that for the rest of his life. Many of the personnel at the SOE felt that he was biased against the nature of their outfit, but Dansey was one of the men directly responsible for the SOE's creation, and its first director, Frank Nelson, had been one of his own Z agents. By the 1940s, having seen British intelligence networks collapse around the world, Dansey had developed trust issues and paranoia, which led to his negative reputation – but also kept him alive when so many of his friends were killed.

== Early life ==
Claude Dansey was born 10 September 1876 at 14 Cromwell Place in Kensington. He was the second of nine children, and eldest son of the Danseys. His father was Captain (later Lieutenant-Colonel) Edward Mashiter Dansey, an officer in the 1st Life Guards. His mother was Hon. Eleanor Dansey, daughter of Robert Gifford, 2nd Baron Gifford.

Dansey attended Wellington College until 1891, when the community was hit with an epidemic of diphtheria, forcing his parents to relocate him to another school.

=== The "Homosexual Scandal" of 1893 ===
Dansey's parents placed him in a private boy's boarding school in Bruges, called the English College (formerly known as Laurence's School), under the tutelage of the Anglican headmaster Reverend Biscoe Wortham. As Dansey had just reached his 16th birthday, he was still discovering his sexuality and going through the later stages of puberty.

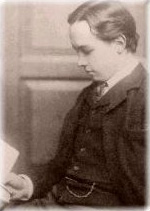
Dansey was romantically and sexually involved with Robbie Ross four roughly six months.

In 1892 or 1893, Dansey was on holiday in Windsor, Berkshire with the headmaster's son, Philip Wortham. While Dansey was here, Philip introduced Dansey to the son of the Attorney General of Upper Canada, a 23 or 24-year-old man named Robert Baldwin Ross, known mostly as "Robbie," who seduced the young Dansey. The two became romantically and sexually involved. Ross "fell hard for Dansey," becoming almost obsessive.

Lord Alfred Douglas, two years younger than Ross and himself a homosexual, sought to "rescue" Dansey from Ross, and brought him to a property called The Cottage at Goring-on-Thames (today known as Mill Cottage, the former home of George Michael), in the town of Goring-on-Thames.

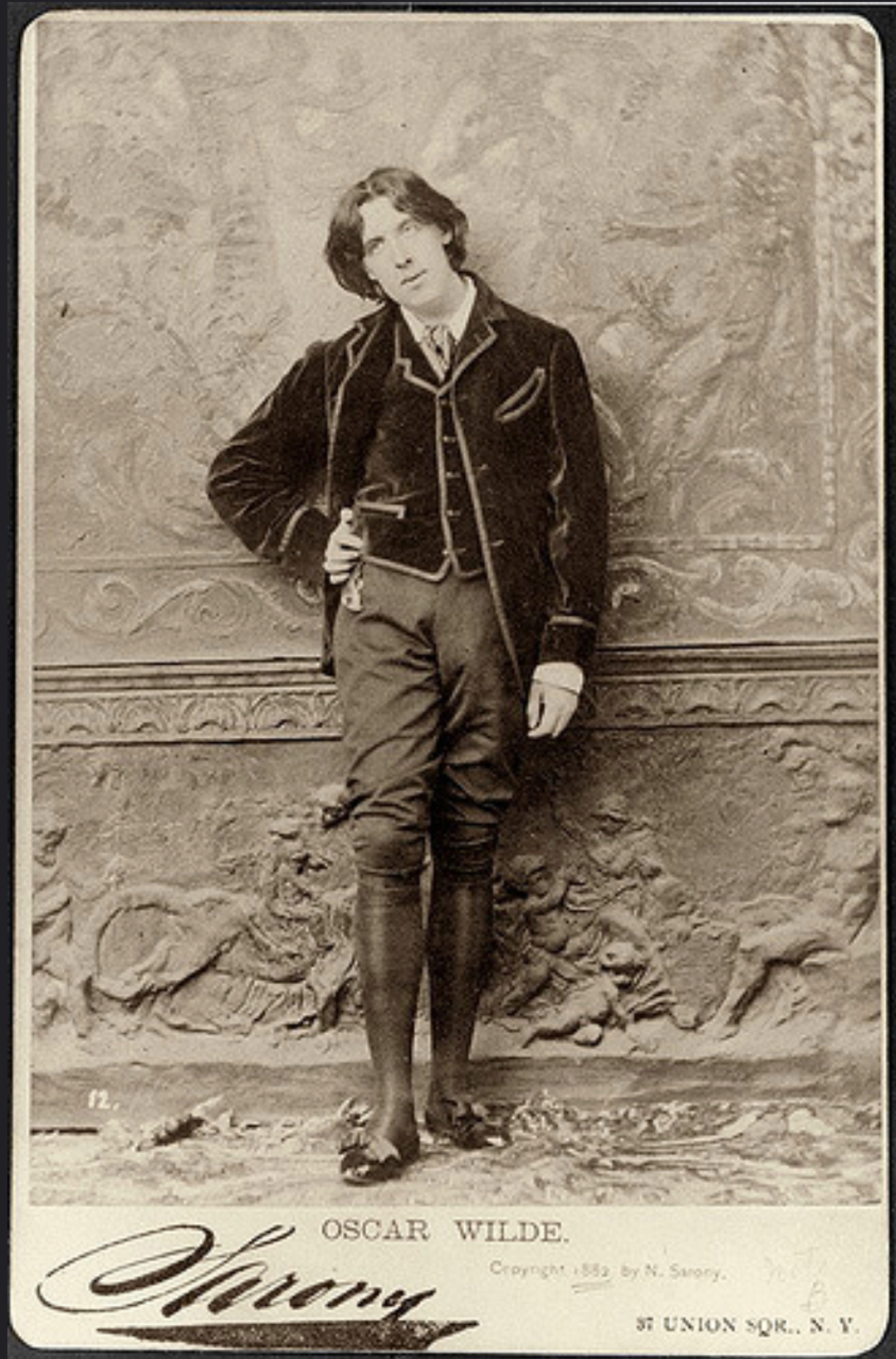
Oscar Wilde was one of the most famous men in the world when Dansey had an evening of sexual encounter with him over the Summer of 1893.

The Cottage and its grounds that summer were being rented by Oscar Wilde, one of the most famous men in the world and author of The Importance of Being Earnest and The Picture of Dorian Gray. Evidence suggests that Dansey had sex with both Wilde and Douglas at The Cottage during the Indian Summer of 1893. According to Matthew Sturgis, however, these events did not take place at The Cottage, but in Wilde's hotel room at the Hotel Albemarle at 60-61 Piccadilly, in London.

The reasoning is unclear, but after a night with Lord Douglas, and a night with Wilde, the historical record shows that Lord Douglas then paid a female sex worker to sleep with Dansey. The following Tuesday, Dansey returned to the English College, three days late for the start of term.

In October 1893, Reverend Wortham was screening his students correspondences. In that era, this was considered normal behavior for the headmaster of a boarding school. The letter was sent by Dansey, addressed to Robbie Ross. Wortham brought Dansey to his office and submitted him to questioning; Dansey admitted the nature of his relationship with Ross. Wortham later questioned his son, Philip, who admitted having been in sexual relations with Ross. The Reverend Wortham would much later discover that Ross had also been romantically entangled with his brother-in-law, Oscar Browning.

Reverend Wortham contacted Dansey's father and informed him of the situation. The elder Colonel Dansey was furious, believing that his son had been taken advantage of, and that his family's honor had been affronted. He consulted the family's solicitor, Sir John Wontner. Initially, Dansey's father wanted to sue Ross and bring a legal case against him. Wontner, however, explained that while Ross would most likely be imprisoned for at least two years, Claude Dansey would also be sentenced to at least six months behind bars "as an accomplice," to Ross's crime of sodomy. Dansey's father decided against pursuing legal action. However, he did arrange for Reverend Wortham to retrieve all of the correspondences between Dansey and Ross from over six months that they had been romantically involved. Wortham met Ross at the Hotel de Flandre in Bruges, where Ross delivered the letters.

To avoid any further scandal, Dansey was removed from the English College. Ross was sent by his own family to Davos. Wilde's own relationship with Lord Douglas became heavily strained after what became known as the "homosexual affair in Bruges."

Dansey never spoke of this event again. However, historians note that through his headmaster's actions, Claude Dansey first learned how to read other people's mail without them knowing, and how to communicate in ways that could remain undetectable, which were valuable skills for his later career. For the rest of his life, he did not trust the security of written correspondences.

== Early career in military and police ==
The colonies of Southern Africa as they appeared in 1895, when Dansey first arrived in the region. Dansey began his service in Matabeleland, seen in the upper-right portion of this map.

=== Second Matabele War ===
In 1895, when Dansey was 18, his father contacted Edric Gifford, 3rd Baron Gifford – Dansey's uncle – to locate a suitable position for Dansey in Southern Africa, believing that this was far enough away from Europe for any rumors of the Bruges incident to have spread. Lord Gifford was at the time was the chairman of the Exploring Company, chief of the Bechuanaland Exploration Company, director of the British South Africa Company (BSAC), and a close friend of Cecil Rhodes and Leander Starr Jameson. Another one of Dansey's uncles, Maurice Gifford, had already been a member of an elite police force here known as the British South Africa Police (BSAP), and had served during the First Matabele War in the company that took Bulawayo, where he was still living.

After roughly a month of travel by ship, train, and stage coach, Dansey arrived at Bulawayo, where he was placed into the Matabeleland Cavalry Regiment of the British South Africa Police. Here, he was trained in horsemanship, outdoor cooking, survival, and other skills needed to survive in the bush and shrubland for weeks at a time. The modus operandi of the BSAP was constant patrolling of the wilderness, with officers operating in small teams of several men, and often as solitary patrolmen, without supervision.

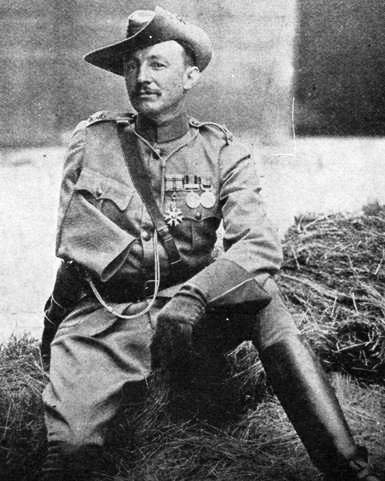
Maurice Gifford, Claude Dansey's uncle, lost his arm in combat in 1896 as the leader of Gifford's Horse. Dansey was fighting alongside him at the time.

In late 1895 and into early 1896, while Dansey was still in training, Leander Jameson led the failed Jameson Raid. After this, many of his fellow police officers were imprisoned in Johannesburg, leaving behind only a small force in Bulawayo. In Matabeleland, the Matabele were inspired by the Boers holding out against the British in their South African Republic just to the south. An outbreak of rinderpest ran through the area, and Dansey's unit was given an order to slaughter cattle en-masse.

On 20 March 1896, the Mlimo – who blamed the drought and the plague on the British – led the Matabele and the Shona to rise up against the British, officially starting the Second Matabele War. In roughly a week, they had killed over a hundred settlers, and the death toll was rapidly rising. The Mlimo decreed that all whites in Matabeleland were to be slaughtered or forced to flee the land. The town of Bulawayo was then placed under siege by the Matabele nation for several months. Only 22 BSAP mounted police officers were left in Bulawayo by this point, and Dansey was one of them.

The settlers responded by raising the Bulawayo Field Force under Colonel William Napier, and Dansey's uncle Maurice Gifford put together two troops of cavalry called Gifford's Horse. Dansey and the surviving members of the BSAP were pressed into the service of Gifford's Horse. This unit broke through the siege line several times, riding into the bush to rescue settlers from Matabele attacks, suppressing several waves of Matabele Imbizo formations throughout April. "Uncle Maruice" lost his arm in one of these attacks, but continued to lead Gifford's Horse.

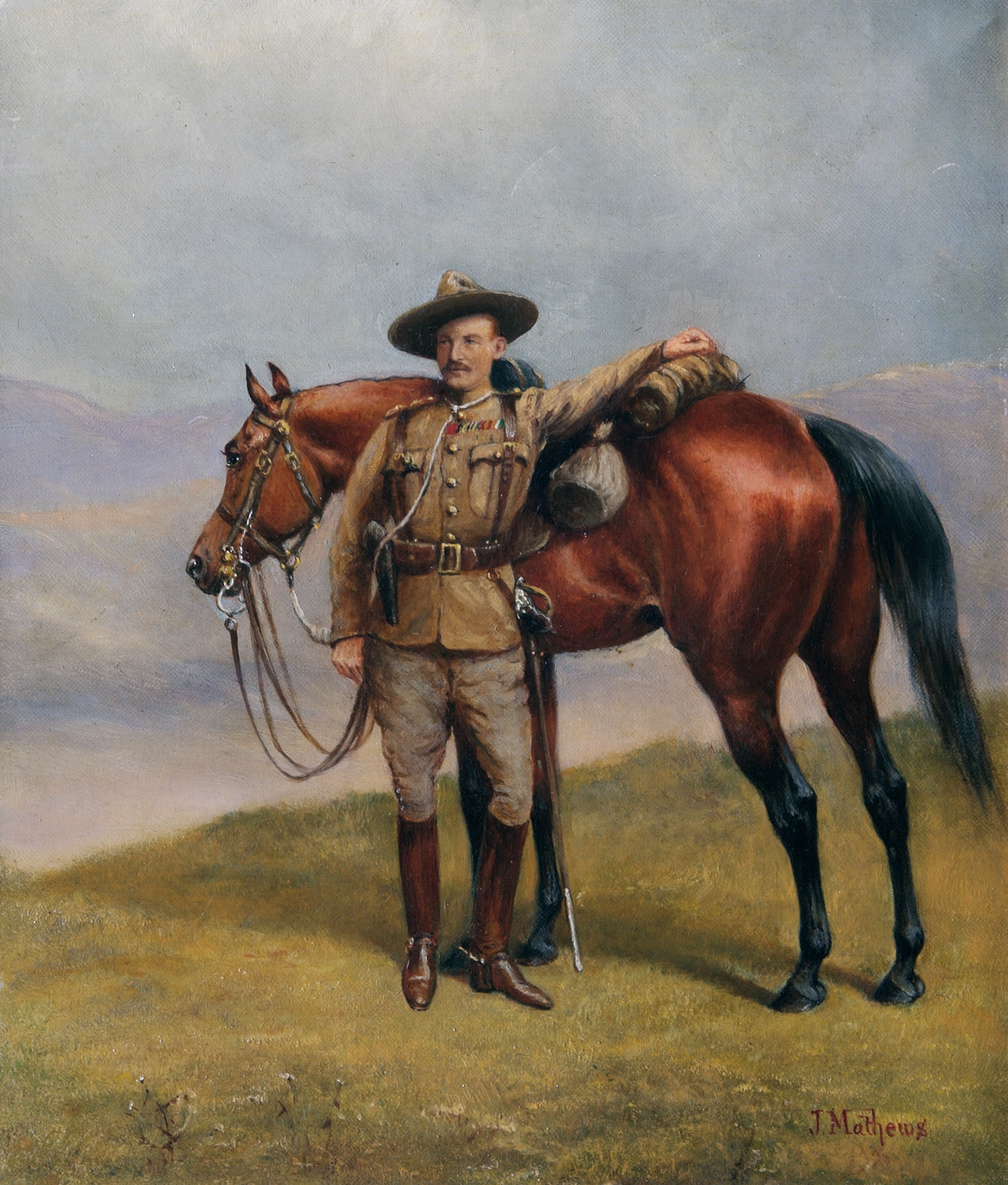
Claude Dansey learned many of his early lessons in scouting and espionage from Robert Baden-Powell, who later became the founder of the Scouting Movement.

It was not until late May when Cecil Rhodes riding in from the north, accompanied by Colonel Plumer from the south, arrived in the town to break the siege. Rhodes requested assistance from the British Crown, and they sent Frederick Carrington and Colonel Baden-Powell (later to be the founder of the Scouting Movement) to bolster the security of the region.

Dansey rode out with the new arrivals, especially learning the basics of scouting and intelligence gathering from Baden-Powell and Frederick Russell Burnham. From the Impi and the Xhosa in the formation, Dansey also learned the basics of indigenous tracking methods. It took until mid-July for the soldiers to push the Matabele back to the Matopos. Baden-Powell forced the Matabele into submission and arranged a peace deal.

In 1897, after the Matabele rebellion, Dansey rode north with the cavalry troops led by Colonel Edwin Alderson to suppress the Shona rebellion in Mashonaland. Here, Dansey was engaged in many early forms of special operations against the Shona peoples.

Just shy of his 21st birthday, Dansey's 3-year contract with the BSAP was up for renewal, and he decided to leave the colony, seeking adventure in other lands.

=== Egypt and Crete ===
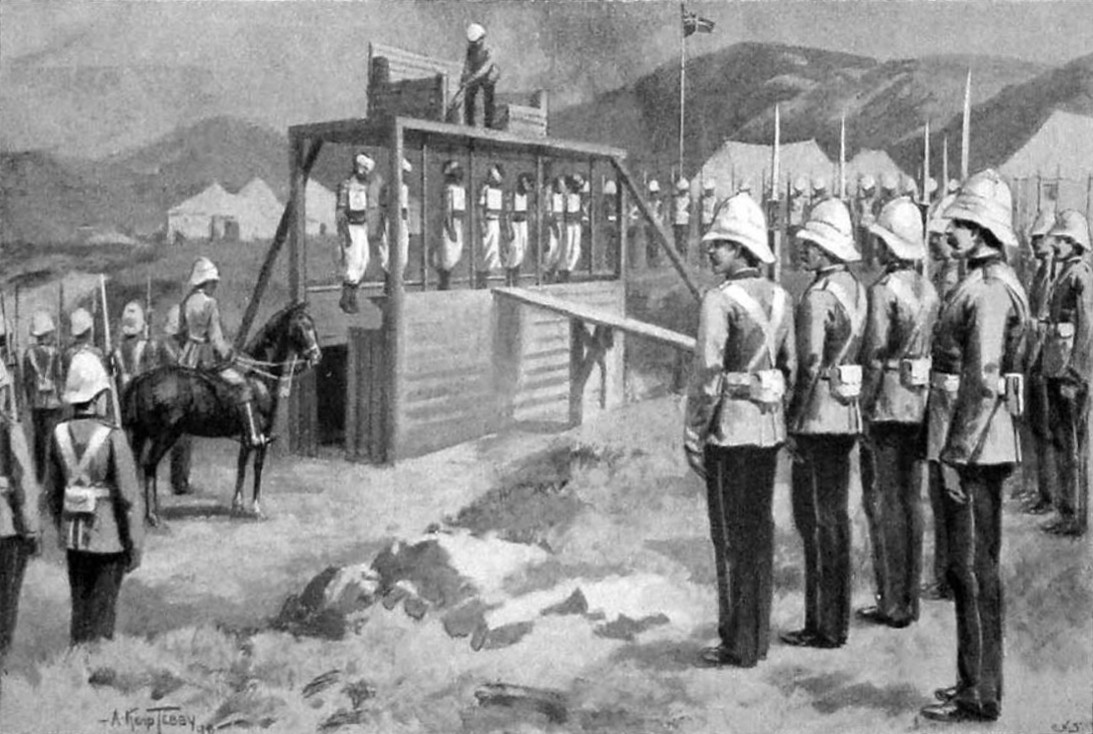
Claude Dansey was on Crete on 18 October 1898, when the first seven Ottoman-Turkish men convicted of murdering British subjects in the Candia Riot were executed. More soon followed.

After visiting Madagascar and British East Africa, in 1898, Dansey returned to England where he secured his first commission into the British Militia. As a Second Lieutenant, he spent a month in the summer of 1898 with the 5th and 6th Battalions, Lancashire Fusiliers in Annual training at the Altcar Training Camp and the Salisbury Plain. At around the same time, the Lancashire regulars in the 2nd Battalion under the command of Herbert Kitchener and Hector MacDonald were engaged in the Battle of Omdurman on 2 September.

Hoping to join them in battle, Dansey traveled to join the regulars of the 2nd Battalion in Egypt, but the battle was finished before he got there. He reported to the 2nd Battalion somewhere along the Nile as they were moving by boat to Alexandria.

Four days after the Battle of Omdurman, the Candia Massacre occurred in Crete, and the 2nd Battalion had received orders to travel there. On 11 October 1898, the 2nd Battalion arrived at Crete to join the International Squadron fighting in the Cretan Revolt. The British were here as a part of the Great Powers Alliance in battle against the Ottoman Empire, and the 2nd Battalion was here to maintain security and ensure that the Ottomans would accept the terms of their surrender and leave the island. Two days after Dansey's arrival on Crete, on 13 October, Rear-Admiral Gerard Noel met Edhem Pasha aboard the HMS Revenge to discuss the terms of the Ottoman withdrawal.

Dansey's unit then participated in police actions against the Ottomans to ensure the terms were met. On 18 October, Dansey was here when the first executions were carried out against the suspects of the Candia Massacre. Ottoman forces began withdrawing from the island on 23 October. On 9 November, Dansey was promoted to Lieutenant. On 4 December, the 2nd Battalion was deployed to Malta, but Dansey remained in Crete, with orders to return to his militia unit. At the end of the month, Prince George of Greece and Denmark arrived in Crete, and the independent country of the Cretan State was established.

Dansey was once-again returned to militia duties in England with the 6th Battalion, but he only remained here for roughly half-a-year. On 16 August 1899 – just days after the conclusion of the Spanish–American War – Dansey was officially seconded to service in the British North Borneo Company.

=== Tambunan Valley Punitive Expedition ===
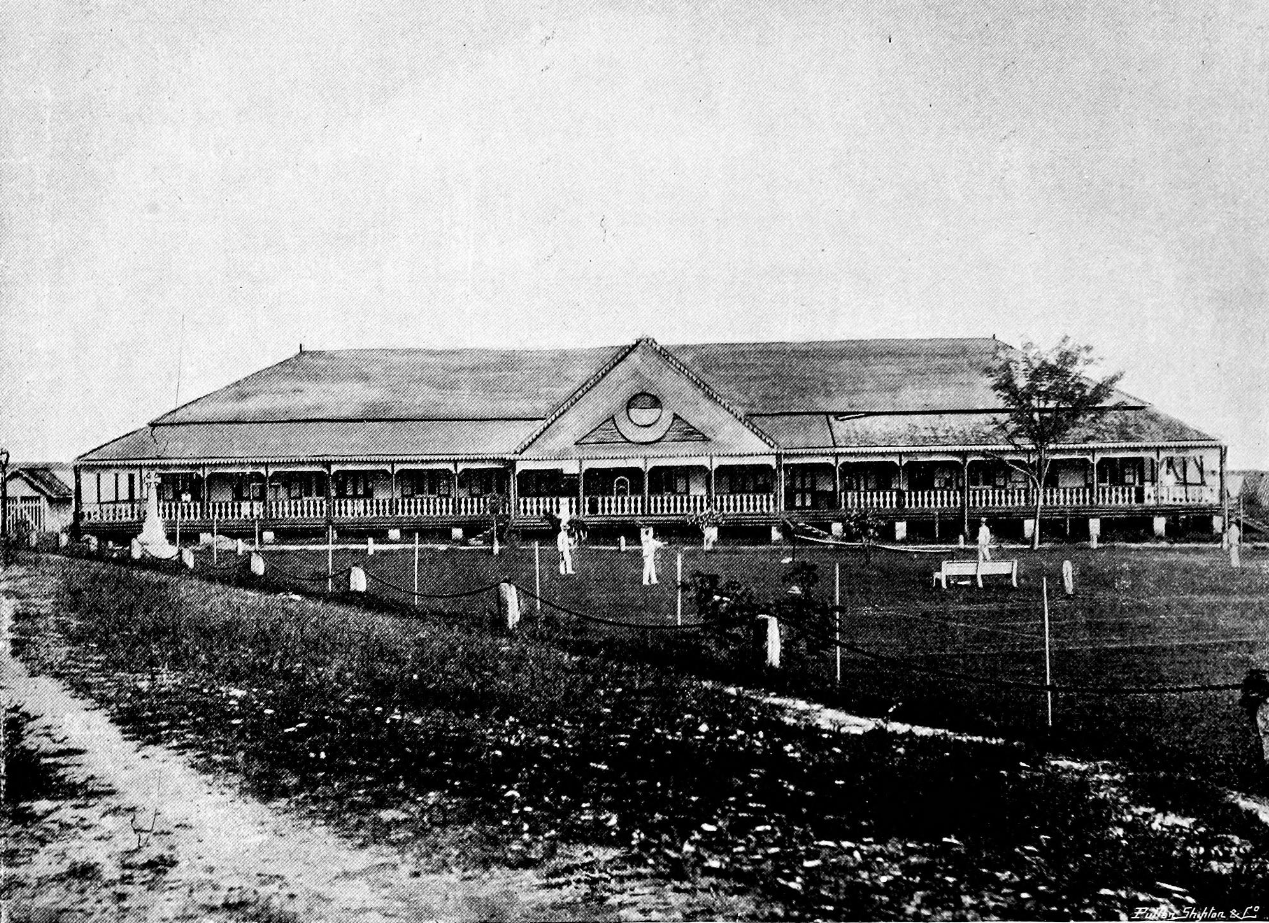
Dansey reported to these colonial company headquarters when he arrived in Sandakan.

After another long journey across the world by steamship, which took 5 to 7 weeks, Dansey arrived in the port of Sandakan, British North Borneo in December 1899, to join the territory's only police force, the British North Borneo Constabulary of the British North Borneo Company, as a Sub-Commandant. He was placed into the command of Captain C.H. Harrington, who was mustering a force of over 100 Sikh soldiers, 500 Dusun porters, and several British officers to march into the Tambunan Valley and crush the rebel encampment of Datu Muhammad Salleh bin Datu Balu, known mostly as Mat Salleh. This was one of the later engagements of the larger conflict known as the Mat Salleh Rebellion.

Mat Salleh, the most wanted man in North Borneo – today known as the Hero of Sabah – was encamped in the Tambunan Valley with several hundred veteran troops. He had also recently recruited 300 Bajau and 1,000 Tegaas Murut soldiers, and had arranged a line of forts along the valley, quartering his troops in fortified villages. His main fortification was moved in December to Tibabar.

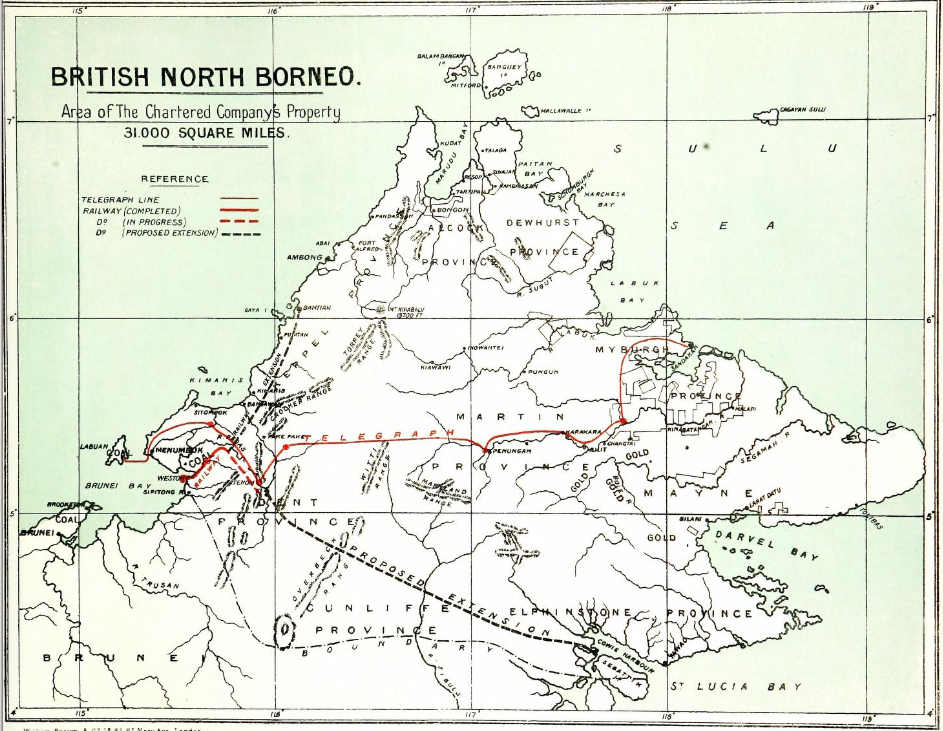
Map of North Borneo in 1899, when Dansey arrived here.

On 22 December 1899, two or three days after Dansey arrived on the island, the Constabulary began the march eastward toward Tambunan, which took nine days. Captain Harrington quartered his troops in Timbau – as it turned out, only 300 yards from one of the enemy fortified villages, from where the enemy vollied sniper fire into camp while the troops were celebrating New Year's Eve and the turn of the century playing a game of cricket.

==== Dansey assumes command ====
Captain Harrington fell ill with fever, and Dansey assumed command of the entire mission. Under his direct command were three other British Sub-Commandants; Fraser, Atkinson, and Douglas, and their platoons.

On 8 January 1900, Dansey uncovered a hidden fort in the jungle and launched an attack against it, but had to retreat. The next day, 9 January, Dansey attacked the village of Piasan, and the two forts on either side of it. He ordered the seven-pounder cannon to fire on the forts, while Dansey took his force on a charge against them. They rushed the first fort successfully, but were unable to hold it, or successfully attack the village because – as Hugh Clifford wrote: "...they stood their ground so well that our men were unable to make an entrance." Dansey ordered his troops to set fire to the first fort. Later in the day, they also destroyed the second fort. On 10 January, they captured the village of Laland, where Mat Salleh lost 60 men. One by one, Dansey's police captured villages and destroyed forts on their movement toward Tibabar. The village of Latob was taken after two days of intense shelling. The Tegaas Murut surrendered their remaining forces, and raised white flags over their own villages.

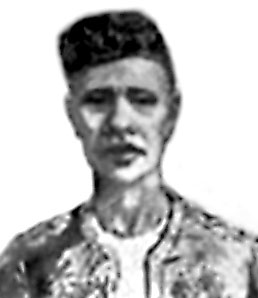
Mat Salleh was the most wanted man in North Borneo. He was killed by Dansey's paramilitary police unit, the British North Borneo Constabulary.

On 15 or 21 January, Dansey's paramilitary police force killed Mat Sator (or Jator), Salleh's Chief of Staff, by shellfire. Sator's fort, which stood overlooking the Pengkalian River, was shelled, and the second shell set fire to the roof of the fort, forcing its occupants to flee, burning everyone left inside alive. After this, Dansey moved the seven-pounder into the charred remains of the Sator's fort, and began shelling Tibabar from 800 yards away.

The Mat Sator Museum was built on the site of the old fort where Sator died.

==== Captain Harrington recovers ====
Captain Harrington recovered from his fever and resumed command, establishing a siege line encircling the compound. They cut off the water to the fort, and shelled Tibabar constantly and continuously for the next four days. Harrington also ordered volleys of Maxim gun and sniper fire on the fort. Salleh did not surrender. He removed the roofs of the fort so they would not catch fire, and dug tunnels under the compound so his men could wait-out the canon fire. Salleh died around 30 January 1900, and he was buried in the fort. Shelling stopped on 31 January. The Dayak members of the Constabulary pursued the rest of the fort into the jungles and killed every person they could find, including women and children – Dansey didn't order this, but he also didn't stop them.

When the Muslim members of the Constabulary performed an investigation of Salleh's body, adhering to Islamic funeral traditions, they discovered that he had been killed by a bullet to his left temple. Anyone in the unit could have fired the killing shot, including Claude Dansey.

=== First phase of the Boer War ===
==== Relief of Mafeking ====
On 5 January 1900, four days before Dansey had captured his first fort in the jungles of North Borneo, the 6th Battalion militia back home in England had volunteered for service in the Boer War, which was now raging in the Cape Colony. Three British Empire cities were now under siege; the Siege of Kimberley, the Siege of Ladysmith, and the Siege of Mafeking. Governor Roberts called for troops to relieve the city. While Dansey had been marching through Borneo's jungles and capturing forts, the 6th Battalion sent an urgent flash message to the telegraphy station in Sandakan for Dansey to leave Borneo as soon as possible and join the 6th in Southern Africa. Dansey had only been in Borneo for ten weeks when he boarded the first boat out of the colony.

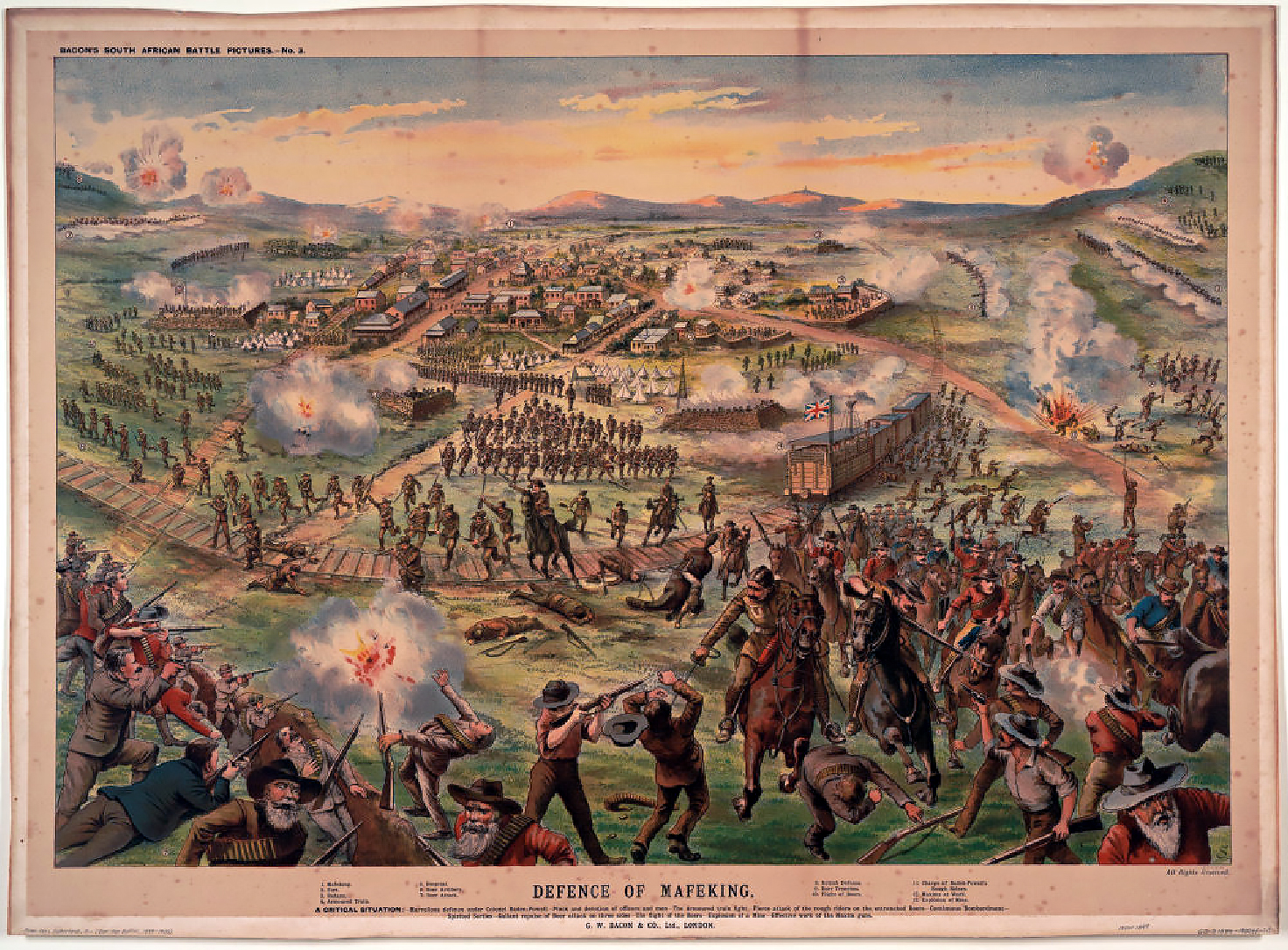
The Siege of Mafeking lasted for over 200 days before Dansey arrived.

At this point, the beleaguered troops of Robert Baden-Powell – Dansey's old commander – had been holding-out under siege by the Boers for almost 200 days at Mafeking, a small town on the edge of the Kalahari Desert. Lord Edward Cecil had managed to secure food and supplies for the town's stockpiles before the siege began by trading on a personal IOU, but the supplies had started wearing thin. Baden-Powell began rationing the supplies, especially among the black population in the Stad. He also armed 300 black men from the Stad, and they named themselves The Black Watch.

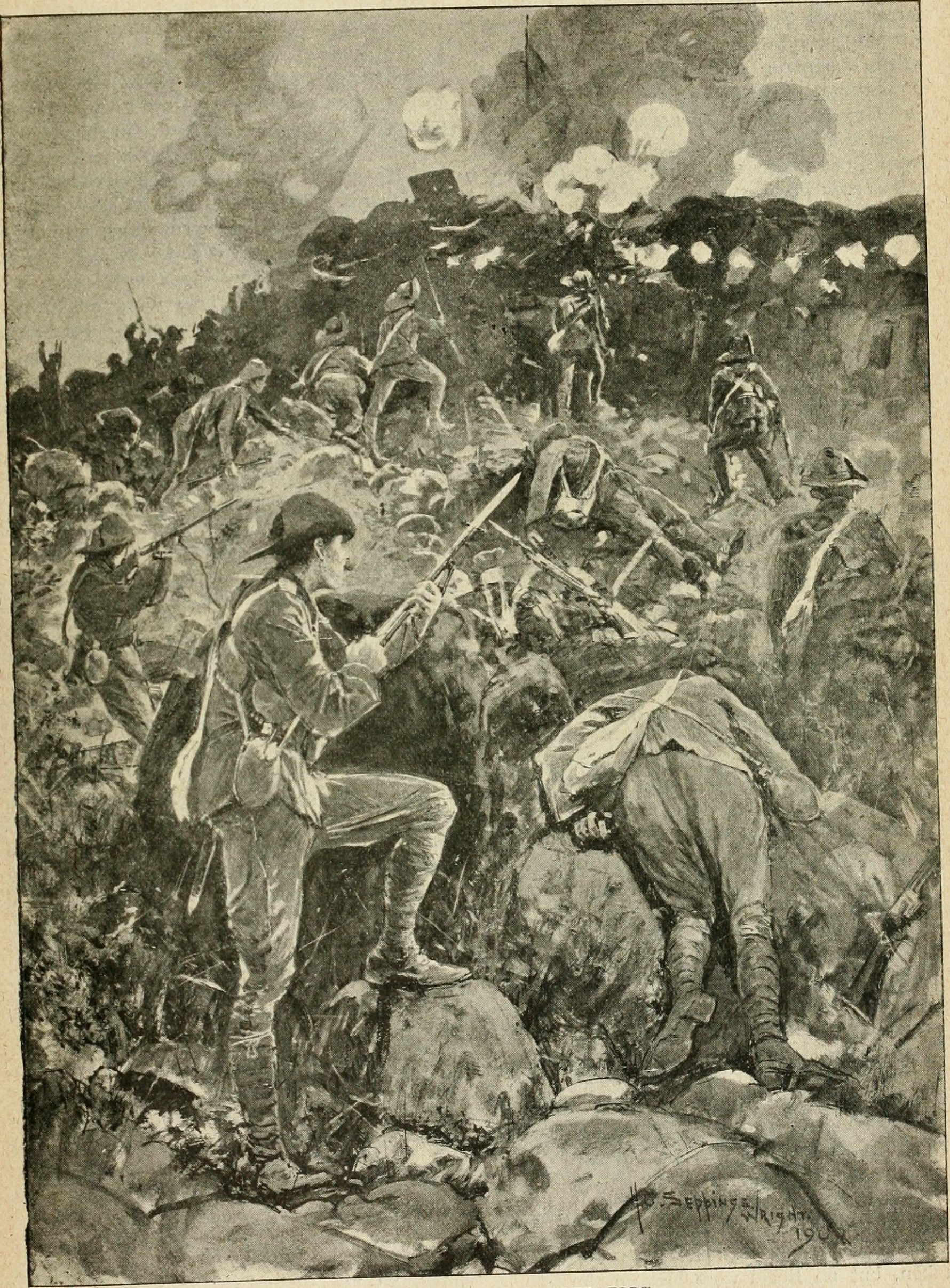
Claude Dansey was with Mahon's column at the Relief of Mafeking.

Dansey met the 6th Battalion in the Orange River Station near Bloemfontein, just over the border from the Orange Free State. Dansey was selected for a special force assembled at the recently liberated town of Kimberley, meet up with Colonel Herbert Plumer, and march on Mafeking to break the siege. Dansey, joining Bryan Mahon's column, left Barkly West on 4 May 1990. Mahon was nicknamed the Mahout because he marched his troops hard and fast, and they stopped in Vryburg five days later, and met up with a scout from Plumer's column on 11 May. On 13 May 1900, the column had to defend against an ambush by the Boers and suffered 31 casualties, with 5 of those killed, while killing 22 Boers. On 15 May, they rendezvoused with Plumer's column 18 miles away from Mafeking.

That night, Dansey joined was deployed on scouting missions around the area near Mafeking "slugging Boer sentries" – silently killing them with a loaded sock – while gathering information on the enemy strength and disposition for Mahon. On 16 May, Mahon took the hill above Mafeking, driving the Boers back. That night, again, Dansey was sent out again to gather more intelligence and silently assassinated several more sentries. Mahon moved into the town.

When the liberators marched into the town of Mafeking, the townsfolk maintained a British stiff upper lip. They were met by a man who said: "Oh, yes, I heard you were knocking about," before rushing off to compete in the town billiards tournament at the saloon.

==== South African Light Horse ====
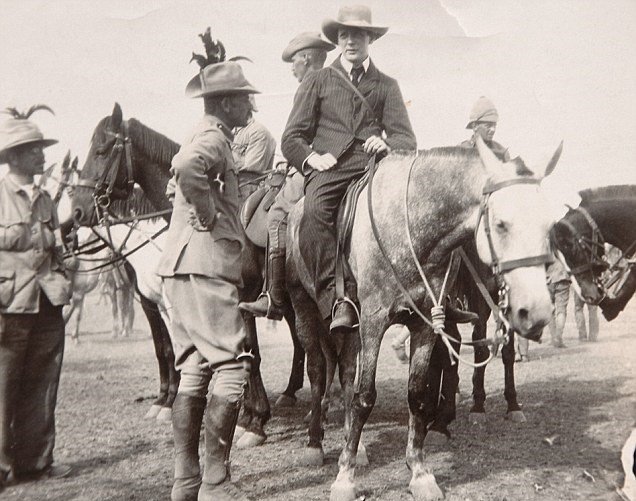
Claude Dansey and Winston Churchill served together in the South African Light Horse shortly after the Siege of Mafeking.

On the night that Mafeking was officially relieved, 18 May, an elite mounted cavalry force called the Uitlander South African Light Horse (SALH) led by General Redvers Buller was engaged in heavy battle to the south with the Boers near the fort of Newcastle. Among that number was Winston Churchill and his brother Jack Churchill, serving as SALH subaltern lieutenants. Winston Churchill had only recently been trapped at the Siege of Mafeking, was captured by the enemy and taken to a prisoner of war camp, escaped on foot, got picked up by General Buller, and rejoined – now fighting fiercely with SALH in the Biggarsberg hills above Ladysmith.

With Mafeking made secure, Mahon, leaving a force behind as security, hard charged his column to meet them. This also included a detachment of SALH that had been present at Mafeking. After riding into the bush with Mahon, Dansey was greeted by his old comrades in the British South Africa Police. Dansey's commanders thought that he was wasted in the militia, and without his knowledge, removed him from the roster of the militia and placed him into the regular British Army, his old unit from Crete, the 2nd Battalion Lancashire Fusiliers. They seconded him as a subaltern lieutenant Squadron Leader into the SALH under the command of General Buller and Colonel Julian Byng.

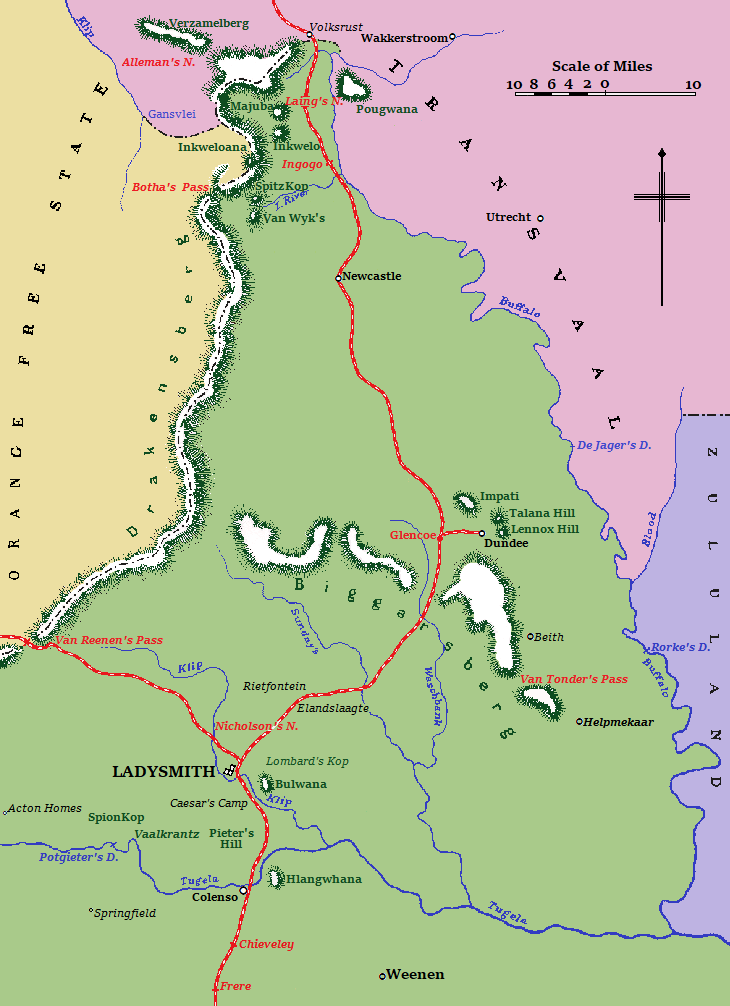
Dansey was seconded to the South African Light Horse during the Northern Natal Offensive. He also fought in South Eastern Transvaal.

With Dansey now leading a full cavalry squadron of the SALH, on 2 June, he joined in the fighting at the Battle of Laing's Nek. On 6 June, SALH seized the Boer encampment on Van Wyk Mountain with only 6 killed and 4 wounded. The Boers had by this point become fond of setting grass fires as offensive weaponry, and SALH had to fight through several fires that night. The morning after this, they rode out to ambush a Boer unit at Standerton, and then ate the breakfast that the fleeing Boers left out on the tables. On 7 June, SALH assaulted the Boers at Yellowboom. On 8 June, they advanced against Chris Botha and took Spitz Kop and Botha's Pass. They pursued Botha's army westward, clearing another mountain fort of the Boers on the 10th. On 11 June, they engaged the Boers at Alleman's Nek, with another 6 killed and 7 wounded.

In the remainder of June and July, SALH was occupied by securing the Pretoria-Natal Railway. On 11 July, SALH prevented the Boers from destroying the railway near Vlaklaagte. Lord Dundonald captured a Boer camp here.

Among over two dozen members of the SALH, including Jack Churchill, Dansey is specifically mentioned in General Buller's dispatches for heroism, bravery, and special reconnaissance duties.

== Career in military intelligence ==
=== Guerrilla phase of the Boer War ===
By September 1900, the Boers as a military unit seemed defeated, but they went to ground to regroup and form guerrilla warfare units. In order to combat the element of surprise, Dansey was recruited by Charles Vernon Hume to begin training a rigid training program in military intelligence under his tutelage in the Field Intelligence Department (FID) of the Directorate of Military Intelligence. Hume organized for the growth of the FID from several soldiers to several hundred, but he was replaced by David Henderson in February 1901, who saw it grow to several thousand. Despite having performed scouting duties throughout his career, this was the first time in Dansey's career when he was professionally trained in military intelligence, and his training did not officially end until 1 March 1902, when he was "officially" seconded to staff intelligence. Henderson would only two years later write the first modern British handbook on military intelligence, establishing much of the doctrine that is still used today. Dansey's training, and his duties here, were mostly classified.

The FID was disbanded at the end of May 1902 when the Boers surrendered and the war ended, but Dansey remained in Southern Africa as the duties the FID were absorbed by the newly established Orange River Colony.

On 24 June 1902, he was appointed the Aide-de-camp to Brigadier-General Charles James Blomfield for the Directorate of Military Operations (DMO) of the War Office, based out of the Harrismith District, Orange River Colony. Blomfield was the former commander of the 2nd Battalion. On 17 September 1902, Dansey was transferred from a supernumerary lieutenancy onto the establishment of his regiment. Dansey worked here at the Orange River Colony until 20 April 1904.

=== Somaliland Campaign ===
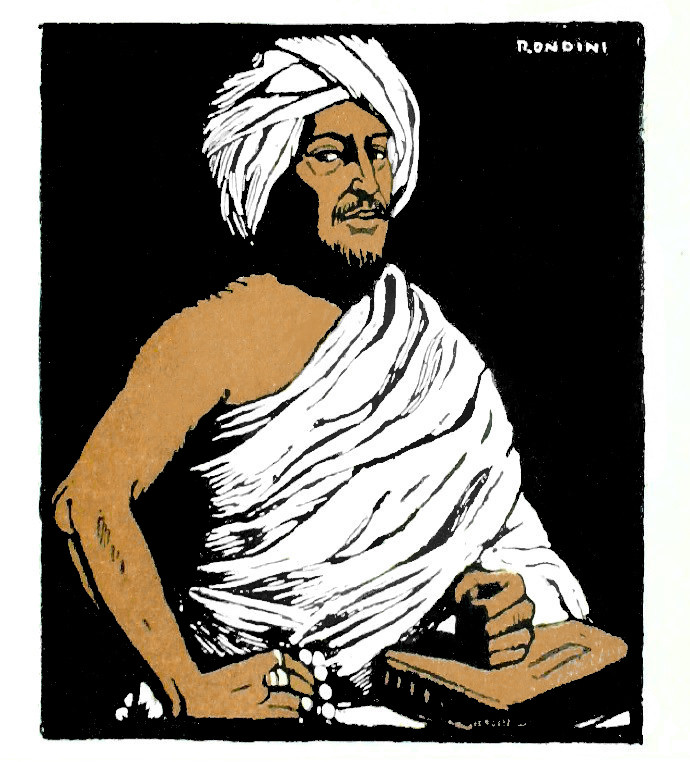
Muḥammad ibn 'Abdallāh Hassan was known by the British as the "Mad Mullah," a fierce fighter and enemy of the state in British Somaliland.

At the age of 28, on 4 November 1904, Dansey was seconded for special extra-regimental employment to the Horn of Africa to become the Chief Political and Intelligence Officer in British Somaliland. For the next five years, he lived and worked in the remote reaches of the colony as a political officer in the pursuit of the man that the British knew as the Mad Mullah, one of the greatest Somali leaders during the Anglo-Somali War.

Dansey officially resigned his commission on 24 October 1906, but he did not leave the country for at least another three years, participating in full-time intelligence duties.

== Early career in civilian intelligence ==
=== Home Section and the Irish Nationalists ===
In 1909, the intelligence apparatus of the United Kingdom was being radically transformed, with the creation of a wholly new civilian intelligence agency known as the Secret Service Bureau (SSB), commonly referred to as the Secret Service. SSB was created with a Foreign Section, whose foreign remit was evident in the name, and a Home Section dedicated to domestic affairs. Dansey was coincidentally recovering in England on sick leave at around the same time, where he was recruited into the Home Section.

His first assignment for the Home Section, during the Irish Revolutionary Period, was related to recent increasing rebellious actions in British Ireland by the Irish Republican Brotherhood (IRB), the Fenians, and nascent organizations that would not become the Irish Republican Army (IRA) for another half a decade. His assignment, however, did not take him to Ireland – he was instead deployed to New York State. Here, he went undercover as the resident secretary of the Sleepy Hollow Country Club, on the banks of the Hudson River, to collect intelligence on wealthy Irish American club members. New York was home to many splintered cells of the Irish nationalist movement, especially one of the most active at the time being the Fenian Brotherhood – which the Home Section feared were financing rebel movements in Ireland, in addition to possibly supplying rebel fighters.

=== World War I ===
While Dansey had been undercover, the Home Section had been absorbed into the War Office and re-designated as MO5(g). In August 1914, with World War I already underway, Dansey was recalled to England where he took charge of port security and port intelligence. As part of the Battle of the Atlantic, he was made responsible for monitoring and surveilling civilian passengers in England's ports. In 1916, MO5(g) was again restructured into the newly restructured Directorate of Military Intelligence, and became known for the first time as MI5.

==== Creation of the Military Intelligence Section and Military Intelligence Division ====
In 1917, the European coalition of Allies of World War I were hoping that the United States would enter into the war with a declaration against Germany, but President Woodrow Wilson was especially seen by the British to be intransigent and unwilling to commit American troops. However, when Claude Dansey's department of MI5 monitoring Room 40 uncovered the Zimmermann telegram, the Americans were much more willing to enter into the war.

In 1917, while still a member of the MI5, Dansey was re-deployed to the United States to assist Dennis E. Nolan and Ralph Van Deman in the creation of America's first military intelligence agency, known as the Military Intelligence Section (MIS) and Military Intelligence Division (MID), and the Corps of Intelligence Police (CIP) – both of which were based on the British system. Dansey even set-up a desk in the corner of Van Deman's office. CIP was not only the first military intelligence police unit of the US government, it was also the only unit raised entirely of Non-Commissioned Officers (NCO's), who were then trained at a British intelligence school set-up at Le Havre.

While on this assignment for MI5, Dansey was "inadvertently" responsible for allowing Leon Trotsky to return to Russia.

=== Secret Intelligence Service ===
Later in the war, he was transferred to the Secret Intelligence Service (MI6), raised to the rank of Lieutenant Colonel, and sent to "unravel a disastrous muddle" in the Netherlands. For some time, he was sent to Switzerland to take care of the SIS station there.

==== Balkan intelligence network ====
In the final stages of the war, the United States, France, Britain, and Italy all had troops stationed in the Balkans officially to stabilize the region and maintain peace, but unofficially to strengthen alliances between them and their regional partners. Italy had just deployed the Andrea Doria into the Black Sea, and the French and Italians were in Romania attempting to sew the seeds of political discord with the peace process. The British Foreign Office desired someone to create an ad-hoc intelligence organisation to monitor the proceedings of the Paris Peace Conference, and the attitudes of those states involved, and they chose Dansey to lead it.

Dansey was deployed then to Salonika and Dobruja, where he met-up with Tom Bridges, a soldier he had served with in South Africa who was now in charge of the British forces stationed in the Balkans. In Bulgaria, he noted in his correspondences back home that the man he called "the Bulgar," Ferdinand I of Bulgaria, was recovering rapidly. In Romania, he reported that the French were attempting to undermine the British in that country.

==== Paris Peace Conference ====
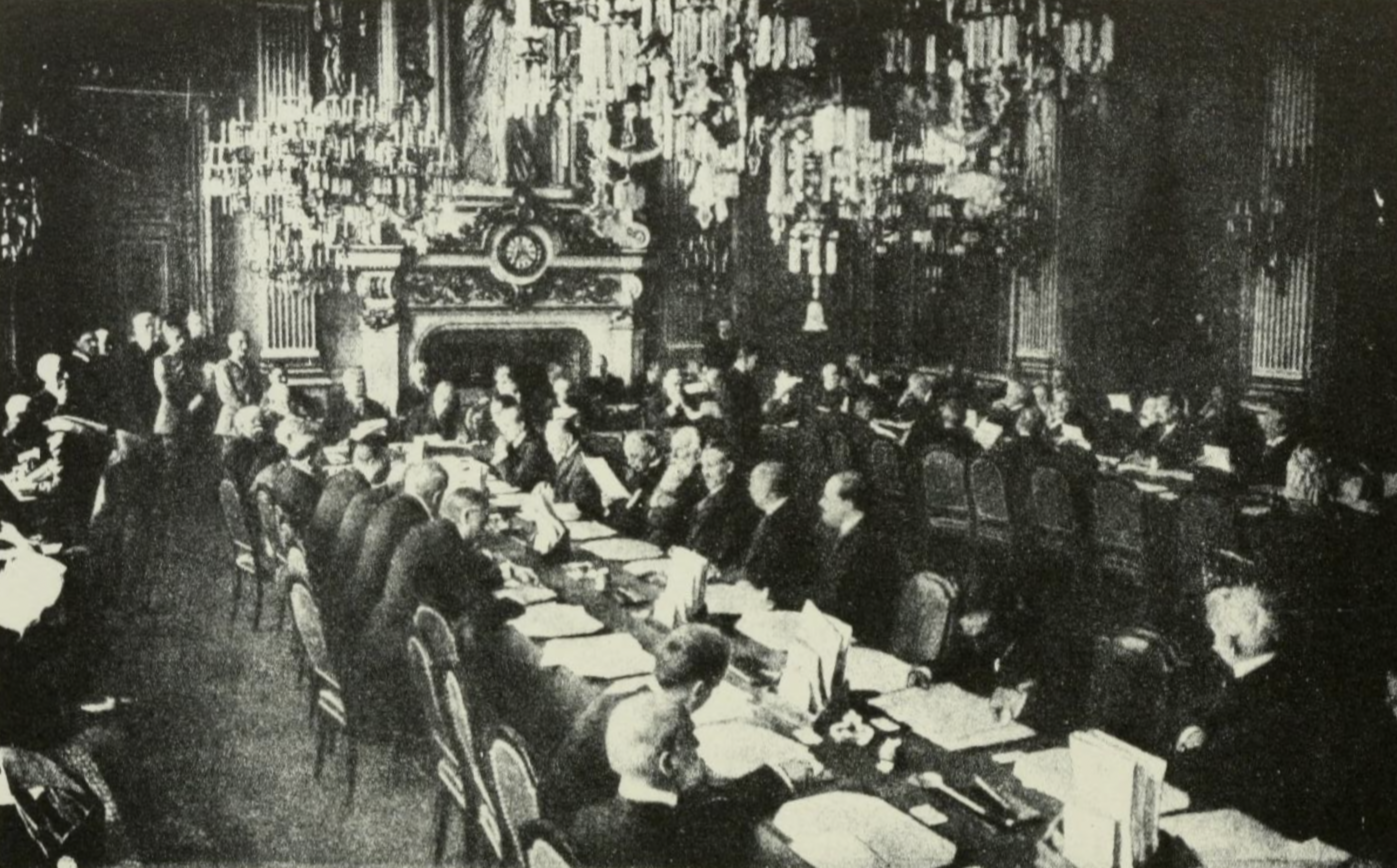
The first plenary session of the peace conference, held in the Ministry of Foreign Affairs, Paris, on January 18, 1919

On 19 February 1919, a French anarchist named Émile Cottin attempted to assassinate Georges Clemenceau, forcing the British delegation to replace Sir Basil Thomson as their Chief Inspector of security at the Paris Peace Conference with Claude Dansey at the end of the month. Thomson remained on the security staff in his role as the Assistant Commissioner of Scotland Yard, but Dansey superseded his authority at the conference in investigatory powers. He added three extra bodyguards, two additional inspectors, and twenty-four sergeants and police constables to the British security detail.

At the conference, he was reacquainted with Colonel Ralph Van Deman and Marlborough Churchill, of whom he had previously met while stationed in the United States. Of great concern to these men was the proposition that President Wilson made, which was to outlaw every secret service in the world. To their relief, Wilson's proposal was not accepted by the conference. They did, however, agree to the creation of a League of Nations.

It is unknown if Dansey first met William J. "Wild Bill" Donovan at the conference, or if they had met earlier in the war, but Donovan was also present here as a member of the American delegation.

=== Interwar Period ===
With the end of the war, the intelligence services of the United Kingdom went through downsizing, but Mansfield Smith-Cumming saw this as another undercover opportunity for Claude Dansey. On paper, for the first time since his childhood, at the age of 43 or 44, Dansey "left" the British government. Undercover for Cumming, he went into the private sector, spending the Roaring Twenties and the Jazz Age traveling between the Americas and Europe, becoming involved in several business ventures.

After the war he went into business but in 1929 he rejoined the intelligence services in Rome, with his cover being a passport control officer. When the chief of MI6 (then Hugh Sinclair) realized that the Germans had penetrated several MI6 stations, Dansey was tasked with setting up a parallel network of agents in the affected areas.

== Z Organisation ==
He left Rome in 1936, with the rumour following him that he had been sacked for embezzlement and he worked for an import-export office in Bush House in The Strand.

He used the codename Z and avoided the use of wireless.

== Deputy Chief of the Secret Intelligence Service ==
In September 1939 this "Z network" was folded into the MI6 networks and Dansey was sent to Bern. He returned to London to become deputy to Stewart Menzies, chief of MI6 (SIS), after the death of Hugh Sinclair in November 1939 where he was in charge of "active espionage".

He retired in 1945, to Bathampton Manor, near Bath.

== Dates of rank ==
1895	Constable	Mounted Police	British South Africa Police
13 June 1898	Second Lieutenant	Militia	5th and 6th Battalions, Lancashire Fusiliers
9 November 1898	Lieutenant	Militia	5th and 6th Battalions, Lancashire Fusiliers
16 August 1899	Sub-Commandant	Police	British North Borneo Constabulary
1900	Subaltern Squadron Leader	Cavalry	South African Light Horse
24 February 1900	Second Lieutenant	British Army	2nd battalion, Lancashire Fusiliers
15 August 1900	Lieutenant	British Army	
1 March 1902	Staff Lieutenant	British Army	
24 June 1902	Aide-de-camp	British Army	Brigadier-General Charles James Blomfield
24 October 1906	Resigned commission	British Army	
10 April 1907	Captain	Army Reserve	Reserve of Officers
20 August 1917	Major	British Army	1/2nd Battalion Monmouthshire Regiment Territorial Force
c. 1917	Lieutenant Colonel	British Army	Secret Intelligence Service
February 1919	Chief Inspector	Police	Paris Peace Conference

== Controversies ==
In an episode of Secret War, members of the Special Operations Executive (SOE) insinuated that Dansey betrayed an SOE network called the Prosper network, instructing Henri Déricourt to send the information of over 60 special operators to the Germans in order to save the D Day plan.
