= Robert Gifford =

Robert Gifford may refer to:

- Robert Gifford, 1st Baron Gifford (1779–1826), British barrister, judge, and politician
- Robert Gifford, 2nd Baron Gifford (1817–1872), his son
- Robert Swain Gifford (1840–1905), American painter
- Robert Gifford (psychologist), Canadian psychologist

== See also ==
- Robert Giffard de Moncel (c. 1587–1668), French surgeon and apothecary
- Rob Gifford, British radio correspondent
