= John Fitzhardinge Paul Butler =

Recipient of the Victoria Cross

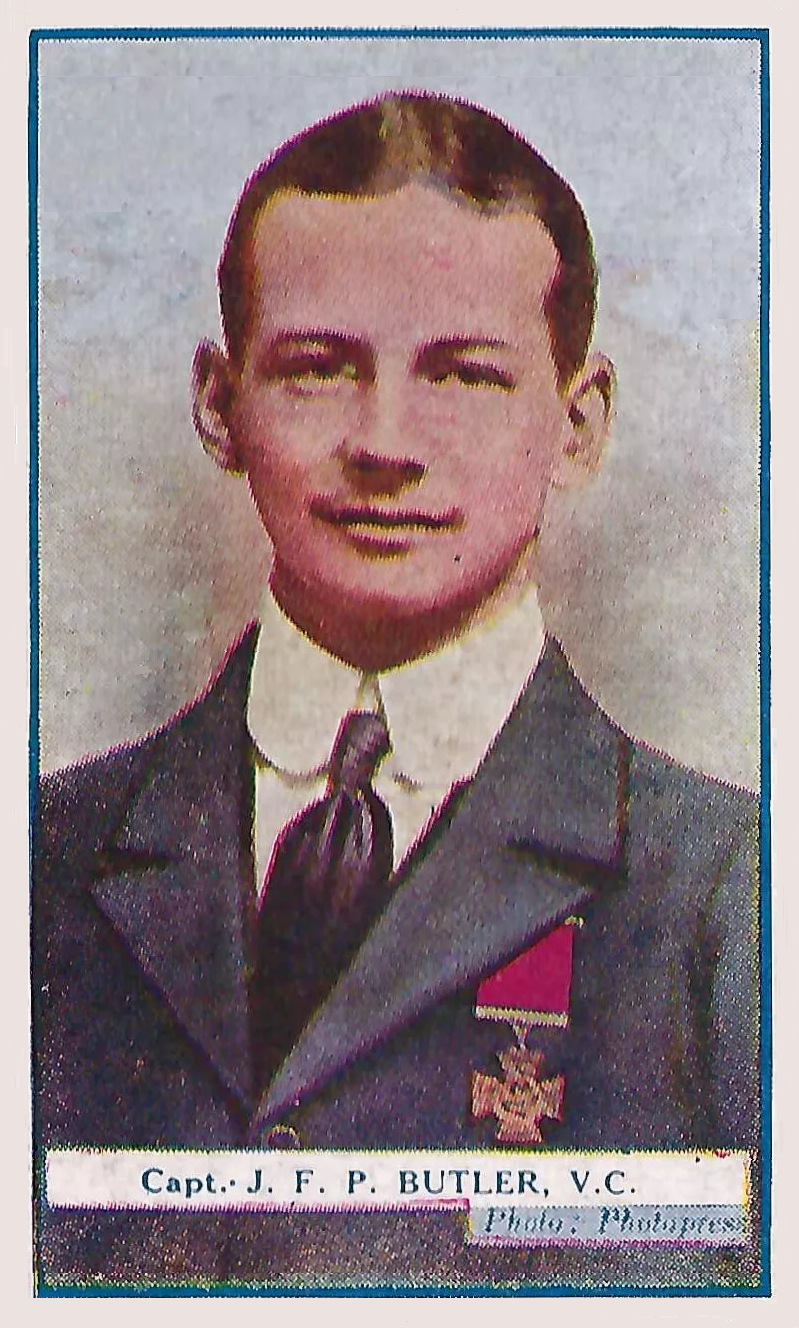
- Butler VC on a cigarette card
- Born: 20 December 1888; Berkeley, Gloucestershire
- Died: 5 September 1916 (aged 27); Matombo, German East Africa
- Burial place: Morogoro Cemetery, Tanzania
- Relatives: Edric Gifford, 3rd Baron Gifford VC (uncle)
- Military career
- Allegiance: United Kingdom
- Branch: British Army
- Service years: 1907–1916
- Rank: Captain
- Units: King's Royal Rifle Corps
- Conflicts: First World War: Kamerun campaign
- Awards: Victoria Cross; Distinguished Service Order

John Fitzhardinge Paul Butler VC, DSO (20 December 1888 – 5 September 1916) was a British Army officer during the First World War and an English recipient of the Victoria Cross, the highest award for gallantry in the face of the enemy that can be awarded to British and Commonwealth forces.

== Background ==
Butler was born in Berkeley, Gloucestershire, on 20 December 1888 to Lieutenant Colonel Francis John Paul Butler and the Hon. Elspeth Butler (née Gifford), daughter of Robert Gifford, 2nd Baron Gifford. Butler was thus the nephew of fellow Victoria Cross recipient Edric Gifford, 3rd Baron Gifford.

He was married, to Alice Amelia of Portfield, Chichester.

== Military career ==
In February 1907, Butler was commissioned into the King's Royal Rifle Corps. In October 1913 he was seconded for service under the Colonial Office, and attached to the Gold Coast Regiment.

Butler was a 25 year old lieutenant in The King's Royal Rifle Corps, attached to Pioneer Company, Gold Coast Regiment, West African Frontier Force, when he was awarded the Victoria Cross for his actions on 17 November 1914 in the Cameroons, Nigeria.

=== Citation ===
For most conspicuous bravery in the Cameroons, West Africa. On 17th November, 1914, with a party of 13 men, he went into the thick bush and at once attacked the enemy, in strength about 100, including several Europeans, defeated them, and captured their machine gun and many loads of ammunition. On 27th December, 1914, when on patrol duty, with a few men, he swam the Ekam River, which was held by the enemy, alone and in the face of a brisk fire, completed his reconnaissance on the further bank, and returned in safety. Two of his men were wounded while he was actually in the water

— The London Gazette, 23 August 1915

The following year he was promoted captain and awarded the Distinguished Service Order. Posted to German East Africa with his Regiment, he was killed in action at Motomba on 5 September 1916 and is buried at Morogoro Cemetery in Tanzania.

== Medal ==
His medal is displayed at the Royal Green Jackets (Rifles) Museum in Winchester.

== Bibliography ==
- Gliddon, Gerald (1997). The Register of the Victoria Cross. Gloucestershire, England: This England. ISBN 0-906324-27-0.
- Gliddon, Gerald (2005). The Sideshows. VCs of the First World War. Gloucestershire, England: Sutton Publishing. ISBN 978-0-7509-2084-1.
- Harvey, David (2000). Monuments to Courage. Naval & Military Press. ISBN 1843423561.
