= Baron Gifford =

Title in the Peerage of the United Kingdom

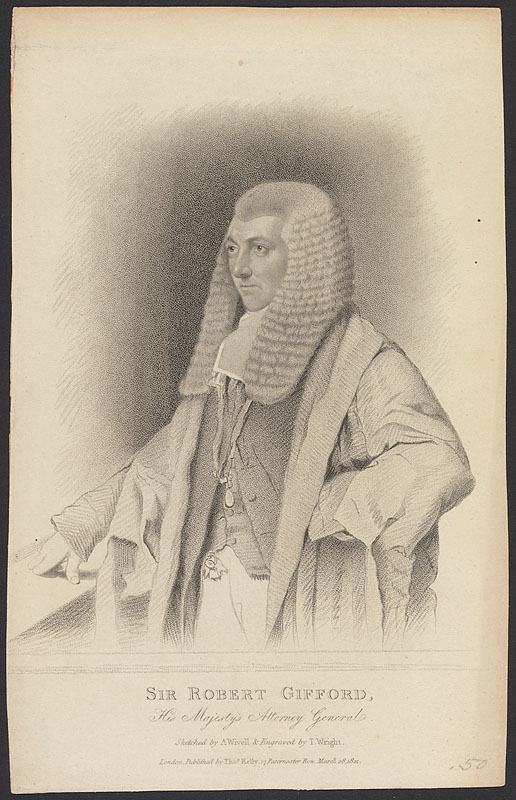
Robert Gifford, 1st Baron Gifford.

Baron Gifford, of St Leonard's in the County of Devon, is a title in the Peerage of the United Kingdom. It was created on 30 January 1824 for the lawyer Sir Robert Gifford, who later served as Master of the Rolls. His grandson, the third Baron, was a soldier and colonial administrator and was awarded the Victoria Cross in 1874. On his death the title passed to his younger brother, the fourth Baron, and then to their nephew, the fifth Baron. As of 2010 the title is held by the latter's son, the sixth Baron, who succeeded in 1961. He is a barrister.

The Hon. Maurice Gifford, fourth son of the second Baron, was a soldier.

The family surname and the title of the barony are pronounced "Jifford".

== Barons Gifford (1824) ==
- Robert Gifford, 1st Baron Gifford (1779–1826)
- Robert Francis Gifford, 2nd Baron Gifford (1817–1872)
- Edric Frederick Gifford, 3rd Baron Gifford (1849–1911)
- Edgar Berkeley Gifford, 4th Baron Gifford (1857–1937)
- Charles Maurice Elton Gifford, 5th Baron Gifford (1899–1961)
- Anthony Maurice Gifford, 6th Baron Gifford (b. 1940)

The heir apparent is the present holder's son, the Hon. Thomas Adam Gifford (b. 1967). There are no other heirs to the barony.

=== Title succession chart ===
Title succession chart, Barons Gifford.

Robert Gifford; 1st Baron Gifford; 1779–1826
Robert Gifford; 2nd Baron Gifford; 1817–1872
Edric Gifford; 3rd Baron Gifford; 1849–1911	Sub-Lt. Hon. Edward Gifford; 1853–1878	Edgar Gifford; 4th Baron Gifford; 1857–1937	Hon. Maurice Gifford; 1859–1910
Charles Gifford; 5th Baron Gifford; 1899–1961
Anthony Gifford; 6th Baron Gifford born 1940
Hon. Thomas Gifford born 1967

== Coat of arms ==
Coat of arms of Baron Gifford
Notes Coat of arms of the Gifford family Coronet A coronet of a Baron Crest A Panther's Head couped at the neck and affrontée between two Branches of Oak proper Escutcheon Azure a Chevron between three Stirrups with Leathers Or within a Bordure engrailed Argent pellety Supporters Dexter: a Bay Horse proper charged on the shoulder with a Portcullis Or; Sinister: a Greyhound Argent charged on the body with three Ermine Spots Motto Non Sine Numine (Not without God's assistance)
