= John Weston Brooke =

British military officer & explorer (1880–1908)

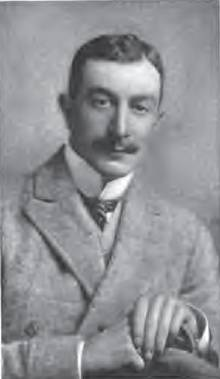
- Born: 2 July 1880; Fenay Hall, near Huddersfield, Yorkshire, England
- Died: 24 December 1908 (aged 28); Niuniuba, Lolo Land (Yi people)
- Military career
- Allegiance: United Kingdom
- Branch: Army
- Service years: 1898–1902
- Rank: Lieutenant
- Units: Yorkshire Dragoons, 7th Hussars
- Conflicts: Second Boer War
- Other work: Explorer

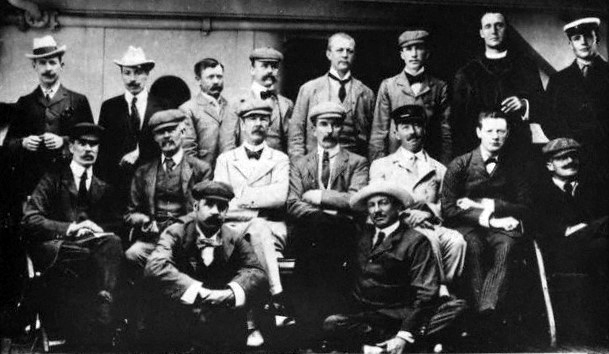
Returning from the Boer War on the RMS Dunottar Castle, July 1900. Standing L-R: Sir Byron Leighton, Claud Grenfel, Major Frederick Russell Burnham, Captain Gordon Forbes, Abe Bailey (his son John would marry Diana Churchill in 1932), next two unidentified, John Weston Brooke. Seated L-R: Major Bobby White, Lord Downe, General Sir Henry Edward Colvile (a year later Churchill as MP would demand an inquiry over his dismissal from South Africa), Major Harry White, Major Joe Laycock, Winston Churchill, Sir Charles Bentinck. Sitting L-R: unidentified, Col. Maurice Gifford (who had lost his arm in the Second Matabele War).

John Weston Brooke FRGS (2 July 1880 – 24 December 1908) was a British military officer and explorer.

== Career ==
Brooke was born at Fenay Hall, near Huddersfield, Yorkshire, England, the eldest son of John Arthur Brooke and Blanche Weston, and went to school at Repton. In 1898, he joined the Yorkshire Dragoons, a Yeomanry unit, and served with the Imperial Yeomanry in the Second Boer War. He was promoted to lieutenant in the Imperial Yeomanry on 10 March 1900. An act of gallantry in the field won him a commission as second lieutenant in the 7th Hussars of the regular British Army, on the recommendation of Field Marshal the Lord Roberts, the commission was dated 3 October 1900, and in November 1900 he returned to England and joined the unit at Aldershot.

In September 1902 Brooke resigned from the army and returned to England. There he met and worked with Major Frederick Russell Burnham, the famous American scout and then a Director of the East African Syndicate. In April 1903, as part of the Syndicate, Brooke left England for East Africa and went on an expedition with John C. Blick, Mr. Bittlebank, and Mr. Brown. The party, known as the "Four B.'s", traveled from Nairobi via Mount Elgon northwards to the western shores of Lake Rudolph, experiencing plenty of privations from want of water, and of the danger from encounters with the natives.

Brooke returned to England in April 1904 and applied himself to the study of scientific objects. He received his diploma for survey from the Royal Geographical Society and was made a Fellow of the Society.

In March 1906, Brooke went to India to organize an expedition to Tibet to investigate the much debated question of the relation of the Yarlung Tsangpo (then called the Sampo) and Brahmaputra Rivers. Because of a treaty between Russia and the government of India, Brooke's party had to enter Tibet from the North, and this meant travelling via Hankou, Xi'an, Pingliang, Lanzhou, to Xining, where the party collected ponies, yaks, and supplies. In October 1906, the 13th Dalai Lama (Thubten Gyatso) arrived from Urgu, and Mr. Brooke obtained an audience to see him, the first for an Englishman. During this audience, Brooke was given permission to enter into Tibet.

Brooke crossed Tibet and returned to Shanghai in October 1907. He left Shanghai for a second expedition in December 1907 and travelled in Western Sichuan and Eastern Tibet until 24 December 1908, when he was cruelly murdered in Niuniuba owned by the Lolos (currently Meigu County, Liangshan Yi Autonomous Prefecture, Sichuan).

== Family ==
Brooke was the son of Sir John Arthur Brooke, 1st Baronet (1844–1920) by his marriage to Blanche Weston. His father was the first of the Brooke baronets of Almondbury, and his brother Sir Robert Weston Brooke was the 2nd Baronet (1885–1942).
