= Henry Colvile =

British Army general (1852-1907)

Major-General Sir Henry Colvile KCMG CB
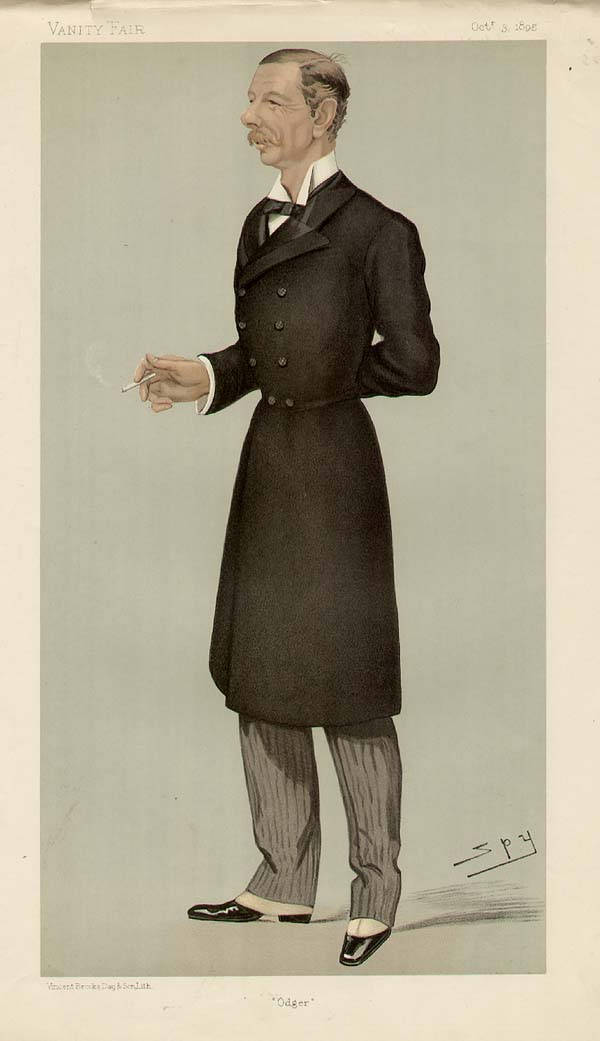
- "Odger", as caricatured by Spy (Leslie Ward) in Vanity Fair, October 1895
- Born: Henry Edward Colvile; 10 July 1852; Kirkby Mallory, Leicestershire, England
- Died: 25 November 1907 (aged 55) Bisley, Surrey, England

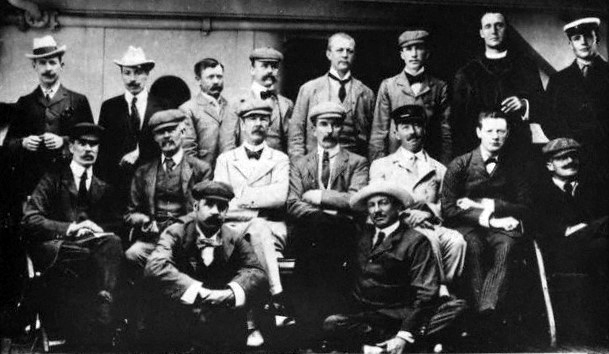
Returning from the Boer War on the RMS Dunottar Castle, July 1900. Standing L-R: Sir Byron Leighton, Claud Grenfel, Major Frederick Russell Burnham, Captain Gordon Forbes, Abe Bailey (his son John would marry Diana Churchill in 1932), next two unidentified, John Weston Brooke. Seated L-R: Major Bobby White, Lord Downe, General Sir Henry Edward Colvile (a year later Churchill as MP would demand an inquiry over his dismissal from South Africa), Major Harry White, Major Joe Laycock, Winston Churchill, Sir Charles Bentinck. Sitting L-R: unidentified, Col. Maurice Gifford (who had lost his arm in the Second Matabele War).

Major-General Sir Henry Edward Colvile, KCMG, CB (10 July 1852 – 25 November 1907) was a British Army officer

== Biography ==
Colvile was born at Kirkby Hall, Leicestershire, the son of Charles Robert Colvile and Hon. Katherine Sarah Georgina Russell.

Colvile was educated at Eton, and entered the Grenadier Guards in 1870. He was appointed A.D.C. to General the Hon. Sir Leicester Smyth, commanding the forces in South Africa, in 1880. He served on the Intelligence Department of the Suakin Expedition of 1884, was present at the Battles of El Teb and the Battle of Tamai, mentioned in despatches, and received the bronze star, medal, and clasp. He was employed on special service in the Sudan prior to the Nile Expedition of 1884–85, and during that Expedition served as D.A.A.G.; was mentioned in despatches; received the clasp, and was created C.B. At the close of the Expedition he was Chief of the Intelligence Department of the Frontier Force; was present at the Battle of Ginnis; was mentioned in despatches, and was promoted to the rank of colonel. He was then attached to the Intelligence Department at headquarters, and wrote the official history of the Sudan Campaign.

Colvile was the author of a plan, dated 1892, for a military expedition to Abeokuta. However, a settlement was reached between the British and the Egba state without the use of military force. The plan is now held at Derbyshire Record Office among the Colvile family archives (collection D461).

In 1893 he succeeded the late Sir Gerald Portal as Commissioner (Acting) for Uganda, commanded the Unyoro Expedition, which resulted in the inclusion of that country into the Protectorate; received the Central Africa Medal, was created Knight Commander of the Order of St Michael and St George (KCMG), and received the second-class Order of the Brilliant Star of Zanzibar. He was selected for promotion to the rank of major-general, 12 April 1898.

Later, he became commander of the Infantry Brigade at Gibraltar in early 1899.

He served in the Second Boer War in South Africa 1899–1900. During the early part of the war he commanded the Guards Brigade, including during the Battle of Modder River in November 1899. He took part in the Battle of Magersfontein on 10–11 December 1899, in which the defending Boer force defeated the advancing British forces amongst heavy casualties for the latter. Colvile was mentioned in the despatch from Lord Methuen describing the battle. The following year he was on 10 February 1900 appointed in command of the 9th Division, with the local rank of lieutenant-general whilst so employed. However, in May 1900, while Lord Roberts was closing in on Johannesburg, a Yeomanry battalion under Colvile's command was cut off and forced to surrender, Colvile was made a scapegoat and sent home. He retired 1901.

== Family ==
Colvile married, firstly, Alice Rosa Daly, daughter of Hon. Robert Daly and Hon. Cecilia Maria A'Court, on 6 August 1878. He married, secondly, on 30 December 1886, Zélie Isabelle Richaud de Préville daughter of Pierre Richaud de Préville and Georgiana Anne Mowbray (1828–1896). Their son, Gilbert de Préville Colvile (1887–1966) who lived in Kenya married Diana Caldwell (1913–1987), later the third wife of Thomas Cholmondeley, 4th Baron Delamere.

Colvile died after his motorcycle collided with Henry Rawlinson, 1st Baron Rawlinson's car at Bisley.

== Works ==
- A ride in petticoats and slippers: an account of a journey through Morocco (Sampson Low, Marston, Searle & Rivington, London, 1884)
- The accursed land, or, first steps on the water-way of Edom (Sampson Low, Marston, Searle & Rivington, London, 1884)
- History of the Sudan campaign (HMSO, London, 1889)
- The land of the Nile springs; being chiefly an account of how we fought Kabarega (Edward Arnold, London, 1895)
- The nick of time: a musical romance in 3 acts (Lamley & Co, London, 1896)
- The work of the 9th Division in South Africa, 1900 (Edward Arnold, London, 1901)
- The ALLIES, ie England and Japan (Hutchinson & Co, London, 1907)
- Henry Charles Shelley, Colvile's Case (W Tarrant, London, 1901)
- The scapegoat: being a selection from a series of articles which have appeared in the review of the week on the case of Sir Henry Colvile (London, 1901)

Government offices
Preceded by James Ronald Leslie MacDonald	Commissioner of Uganda; 1893–1894	Succeeded by Frederick John Jackson
