= Joseph Laycock =

British Army general (1867–1952)

Brigadier-General Sir Joseph Laycock KCMG DSO TD DL
- Born: Joseph Frederick Laycock; 12 June 1867; Newcastle upon Tyne, Northumberland, England
- Died: 10 January 1952 (aged 84); East Retford, Nottinghamshire, England
- Spouse: Katherine Mary Hare
- Relatives: Robert Laycock (son with Kitty Hare); Maynard Greville (son with Daisy Greville); Mercy Greville (daughter with Daisy Greville)
- Military career
- Allegiance: United Kingdom
- Branch: British Army
- Rank: Brigadier-General
- Commands: Nottinghamshire Royal Horse Artillery CRHA ANZAC Mounted Division
- Conflicts: Second Boer War; First World War
- Awards: Knight Commander of the Order of St Michael and St George; Distinguished Service Order; Territorial Decoration

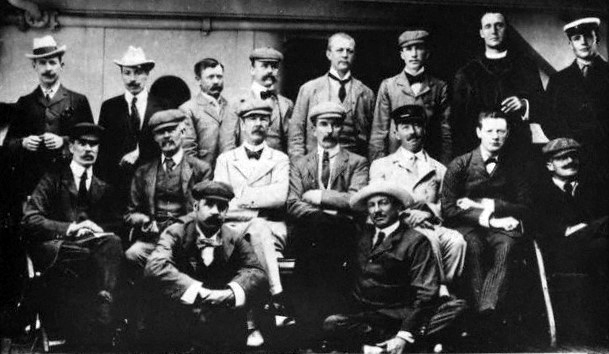
Returning from the Boer War on the RMS Dunottar Castle, July 1900. Standing L-R: Sir Byron Leighton, Claud Grenfel, Major Frederick Russell Burnham, Captain Gordon Forbes, Abe Bailey (his son John would marry Diana Churchill in 1932), next two unidentified, John Weston Brooke. Seated L-R: Major Bobby White, Lord Downe, General Sir Henry Edward Colvile (a year later Churchill as MP would demand an inquiry over his dismissal from South Africa), Major Harry White, Major Joe Laycock, Winston Churchill, Sir Charles Bentinck. Sitting L-R: unidentified, Col. Maurice Gifford (who had lost his arm in the Second Matabele War).

Brigadier-General Sir Joseph Frederick Laycock KCMG DSO TD DL (12 June 1867 – 10 January 1952) was a British Army officer and Olympic sailor. He was at one time a Deputy Lieutenant, Lord Lieutenant and, in 1906, High Sheriff of Nottinghamshire.

== Early life ==
Laycock was the only son of Robert Laycock (1833–1881), barrister, and MP for North Lincolnshire in 1880–81, and Annie (née Allhusen), daughter to Christian Allhusen. He was born at Wiseton Hall, Nottinghamshire, purchased by his grandfather c.1866 and demolished in 1960, which was Laycock's principal residence throughout his life.

== Yachting ==
A member of the Royal Yacht Squadron in Cowes, he had Ramage & Ferguson of Leith build for him a steel auxiliary 3-masted steam yacht, the Valhalla, to a design by Mr. W. C. Storey. She was launched from the Victoria Shipyard on 20 October 1892. Her complement was 100 hands, and she was the only steam yacht in the world to have a full ship rig. He sold her in October 1897.

He had the publisher Howard Cox publish The Log of the Valhalla in 1894

Laycock was friends with Hugh Grosvenor, 2nd Duke of Westminster, and they competed together in the 1908 Olympics at Water Motorsport.

== Military career ==
Laycock served with the Nottinghamshire (Sherwood Rangers) Yeomanry in South Africa during the Second Boer War 1899–1900, for which he was appointed a Companion of the Distinguished Service Order (DSO) in November 1900. He was promoted to major on 7 December 1901 and resigned his commission the following year on 6 December 1902.

He was the first commanding officer of the Nottinghamshire Royal Horse Artillery when it was formed in 1908 as part of the new Territorial Force, and funded the founding of the battery himself.

During the First World War, he served with his battery in the Middle East and also served with the Duke of Westminster's armoured car unit when it was involved in a widely reported incident where it rescued prisoners of war from Senussi tribesmen. Later he became the Commander Royal Artillery for the ANZAC Mounted Division.

After World War I, the Nottinghamshire RHA became a battery of the 60th Field Brigade, Royal Artillery, and Laycock was appointed Honorary Colonel of the whole unit on 22 November 1922.

During the Second World War, Laycock commanded the Nottinghamshire Home Guard.

== Personal life ==
Laycock married, on 19 November 1902, Katherine Mary (Kitty) Hare (1872–1959), a granddaughter of William Hare, 2nd Earl of Listowel. Kitty, the former Marchioness of Downshire, was married to Arthur Hill, 6th Marquess of Downshire (1871–1918), who had divorced her citing adultery with Laycock. Laycock was also in an adulterous relationship with Daisy Greville, Countess of Warwick, issue occurring before and during his marriage with Kitty. Daisy's fourth child, Maynard (1898–1960), and fifth, Mercy (1904–1968), were fathered by Laycock.

Laycock's son from his marriage to Kitty Hare, Robert Laycock, was knighted and awarded the Distinguished Service Order for his services in the Second World War.
