= RMS Dunottar Castle =

Ocean liner (1890–1915)

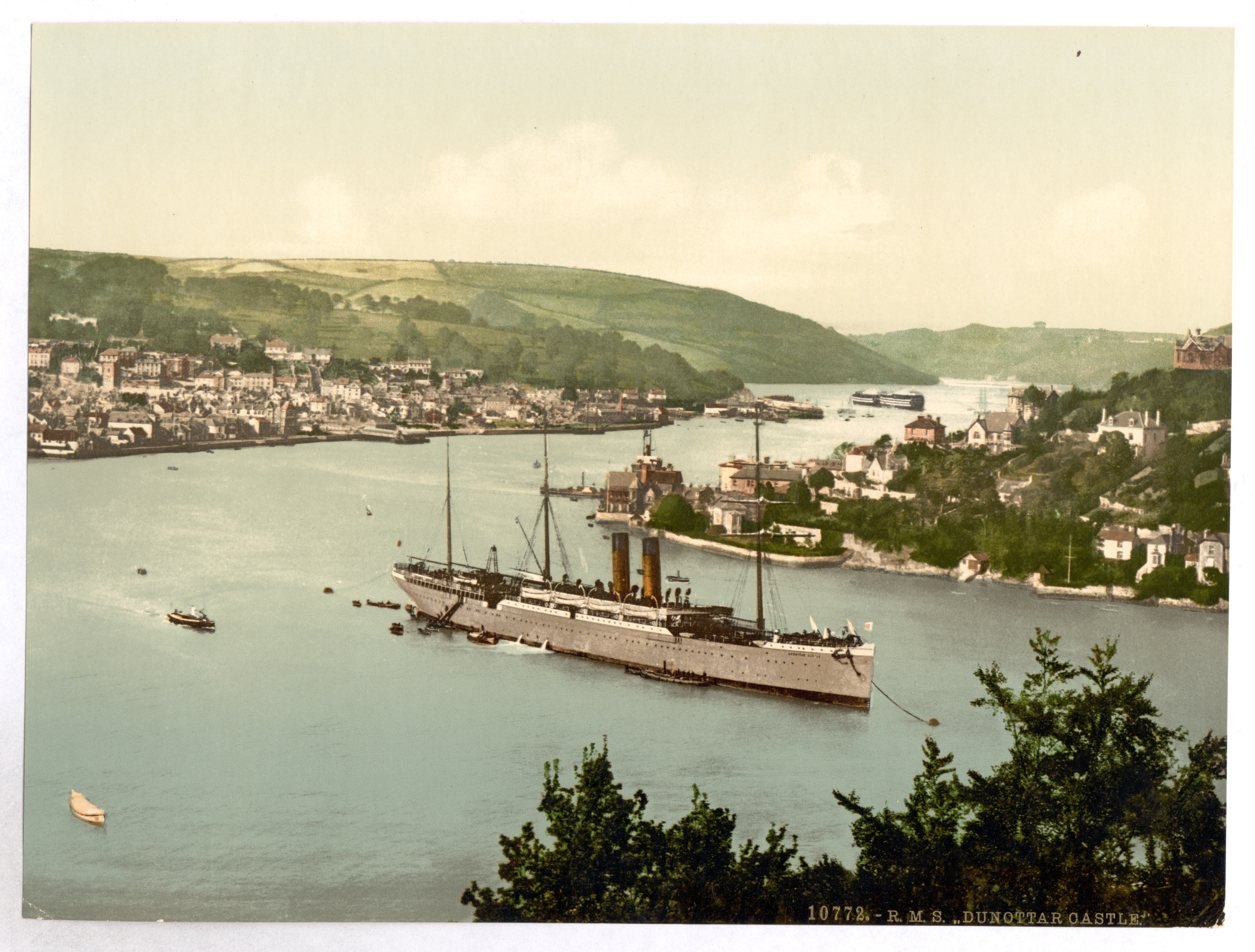
- Dunottar Castle at Dartmouth, Devon

History

United Kingdom
- Name: Dunottar Castle
- Owner: Castle Shipping Line (1890–1900); Union-Castle Line (1900–1913); Royal Mail Steam Packet Company (1913–1915)
- Builder: Fairfield Shipbuilding and Engineering Company
- Yard number: 348
- Laid down: 1889
- Launched: 22 May 1890
- In service: 1890
- Fate: Sunk 35 mi (56 km) off Cape Wrath 27 September 1915

General characteristics
- Tonnage: 5,625 GRT
- Length: 433 ft (132 m)
- Beam: 49 ft 8 in (15.14 m)
- Draught: 25 ft (7.6 m)
- Propulsion: Single screw
- Speed: 17 kn (31 km/h; 20 mph) service speed

RMS Dunottar Castle was a Royal Mail Ship that went into service with the Castle Line (and its successor, the Union-Castle Line) in 1890 on the passenger and mail service between Britain and South Africa. In 1913 the ship was sold to the Royal Mail Steam Packet Company as the Caribbean. After the outbreak of the First World War she served as HMS Caribbean, first as a troop ship and then as an armed merchant cruiser, until she sank in a storm off the Scottish coast on 27 September 1915.

== Construction and service ==
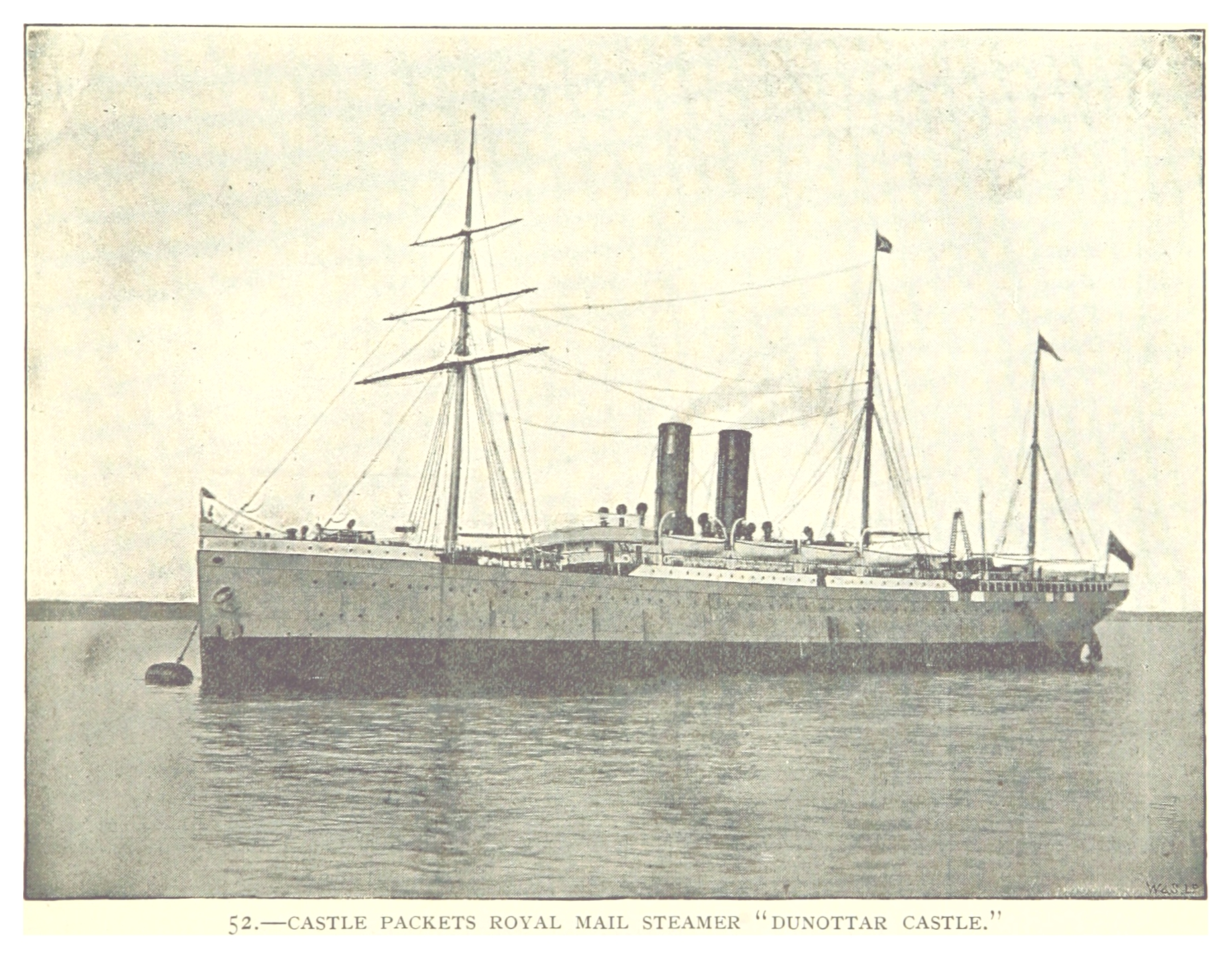
Dunottar Castle, from an 1893 book

Dunottar Castle was built at Govan Shipyards in 1889 by the Fairfield Shipbuilding and Engineering Company for the Castle Line, passing to the Union Castle Line in 1900. She became famous in the 1890s for reducing the voyage from Southampton, England, to Cape Town, South Africa, from 42 to 17 days and 20 hours. In 1894 she grounded for two tides near the Eddystone Lighthouse. She was refitted in 1897 when the funnels were heightened, her yards were removed and she was given a wheelhouse.

== Troop ship ==
In November 1899 Dunottar Castle was requisitioned as a troop ship in the Second Boer War. She carried General Redvers Buller and 1,500 troops to Cape Town for Boer War duties and on the following voyage carried Lord Roberts and Lord Kitchener. In the war she made frequent trips between Britain and the Cape Colony and carried some of the most famous Boer War warriors of the time, including two famous scouts, Major Frederick Russell Burnham and Col. Robert Baden-Powell, as well as a young war correspondent for the Morning Post by the name of Winston Churchill.

In 1904 Dunottar Castle was laid up at Netley in Southampton Water, but by 1907 she was being chartered to the Panama Railroad Co. for their New York to Colón (Panama Canal) service. In 1908 she was chartered to Sir Henry Lunn Ltd for cruises to Norway and the Mediterranean, and in 1911 she took guests to the Delhi Durbar of King George V.

Union-Castle became part of the Royal Mail Group in 1912, and Dunottar Castle was sold to the Royal Mail Steam Packet Company in 1913 as Caribbean. In 1914 she was requisitioned as HMS Caribbean for World War I, initially as a troop ship to bring soldiers from Canada to Europe and later as an Armed Merchant Cruiser. But after it was found that she was unsuitable to carry gun mountings, she was converted into a dockyard workers' accommodation ship in May 1915.

== Loss ==
Caribbean sailed for Scapa Flow on 24 September 1915, but started taking on water at noon on 26 September, about 35 miles (56 km) south of Cape Wrath, Scotland. Three Naval trawlers and two Armed yachts were despatched to assist when her SOS message was received, but the two yachts were obliged to turn back due to the poor weather. The three trawlers from Stornoway and the light cruiser HMS Birkenhead managed to reach the scene. An attempt by Birkenhead to place Caribbean under tow failed, but most of the crew were rescued at Midnight.

The Caribbean sank 7:15 AM on 27 September, and the 15 crewmen still aboard died. The ensuing Court of Enquiry later blamed the ship's carpenter for being insufficiently familiar with the ship and for failing to shut all the scuttles. Like most of the crew, he had joined the ship just ten days earlier. The wreck was found in 2004, undisturbed except for fishing nets.

== Second Boer War milestones ==
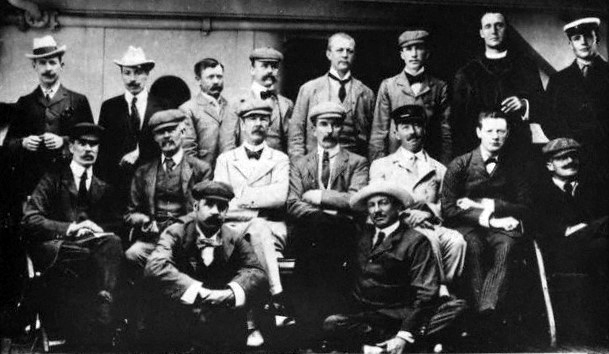
Returning from the Boer War on the RMS Dunottar Castle, July 1900. Standing L-R: Sir Byron Leighton, Claud Grenfel, Major Frederick Russell Burnham, Captain Gordon Forbes, Abe Bailey (his son John would marry Diana Churchill in 1932), next two unidentified, John Weston Brooke. Seated L-R: Major Bobby White, Lord Downe, General Sir Henry Edward Colvile (a year later Churchill as MP would demand an inquiry over his dismissal from South Africa), Major Harry White, Major Joe Laycock, Winston Churchill, Sir Charles Bentinck. Sitting L-R: unidentified, Col. Maurice Gifford (who had lost his arm in the Second Matabele War).

- 3 July 1899, "at a few days" notice from Lord Wolseley, Col. Robert Baden-Powell left Southampton on Dunottar Castle and arrived in Cape Town on 25 July. On 10 October 1899 the Second Boer War began and three days later Baden-Powell was cut off by the Boers in the Siege of Mafeking
- 14 October 1899 Winston Churchill sailed from Southampton aboard Dunottar Castle and reached Cape Town on 31 October.
- November 1899, General Redvers Buller and 1,500 troops were carried by Dunottar Castle to Cape Town to reinforce British Army forces at the start of the Second Boer War.
- 23 December 1899, Lord Roberts quickly departed Southampton on his way to South Africa on the Dunottar Castle where he took command of the British forces in the Second Boer War. En route, Lord Kitchener joined Lord Roberts on Dunottar Castle in Gibraltar to become the second in command.
- July 1900, Winston Churchill and Frederick Russell Burnham left South Africa and returned to England on 20 July as war heroes. On the voyage home, Churchill wrote the following letter to Cecil Rhodes:

My dear Mr Rhodes,

Abe Bailey has spoken to me about a plan to send a small private expedition from Cape Town to Cairo, and has suggested my coming with him. Of course I must think first of all of getting into the House of Commons, but I daresay the general election will be over before the expedition would start and were that the case I daresay I could get away.

I should personally like very much indeed to take part in such an interesting venture, and as I have to make my own living it would be a great advantage to me to do so, for what with a series of letters to a London newspaper and a good sized book to be published later, I should be able to earn a good deal of money.

Now it seems to me that this writing would help to attract public attention to the Cape to Cairo route and stimulate the interest taken in your railway scheme: so that perhaps you will think that our roads lie for some small distance in the same direction. If this be so and you would like me to go with this small expedition as Bailey's companion, will you write me - or have me written for I know you have many things to occupy you - a letter on the subject. This should reach me in about two months time, and I will then give you a definite answer without delay, for by then I shall know what prospect there is of my being able to play at 'the cup and ball trick' (to quote your expression) in the House of Commons.

I lunched and dined with Frankie at Groote Schuur and much admired your beautiful house. I am sorry not to have seen you in South Africa, but the Boers interfered with most peoples' arrangements.

Yours sincerely,
Winston S. Churchill.

12 July 1900

- In December 1900, her propeller shaft snapped and she had to be towed into Dakar. Galician went into service and in the same month went to Dakar to pick up passengers and mail from the disabled Dunottar Castle.
- On 25 November 1901, Dunottar Castle was disabled and towed into Dakar by Runic.
