= Edgar Gifford, 4th Baron Gifford =

British peer (1857–1937)

Edgar Berkeley Gifford, 4th Baron Gifford (8 March 1857 – 29 January 1937), was a British peer.

He was the son of Robert Gifford, 2nd Baron Gifford, and Hon. Swinburne Frederica Charlotte FitzHardinge Berkeley, daughter of Admiral Maurice Berkeley, 1st Baron FitzHardinge. He was educated at Lancing and was a Lieutenant in the South Gloucestershire Militia. He succeeded in the barony on 5 June 1911.

He married Anne Maud Aitchison, daughter of Lt.-Col. William Aitchison, 5 June 1918 and had issue:

- Hon. Serena Mary Gifford (born 30 September 1919).

He died on 29 January 1937 at age 79, without male issue, and was succeeded in the barony by his nephew.

== Coat of arms ==
Coat of arms of Edgar Gifford, 4th Baron Gifford
Notes Coat of arms of the Gifford family Coronet A coronet of a Baron Crest A Panther's Head couped at the neck and affrontée between two Branches of Oak proper Escutcheon Azure a Chevron between three Stirrups with Leathers Or within a Bordure engrailed Argent pellety Supporters Dexter: a Bay Horse proper charged on the shoulder with a Portcullis Or; Sinister: a Greyhound Argent charged on the body with three Ermine Spots Motto Non Sine Numine (Not without God's assistance)

Peerage of the United Kingdom
Preceded by Edric Gifford	Baron Gifford; 1911–1937	Succeeded by Charles Gifford
