= Anthony Gifford, 6th Baron Gifford =

British hereditary peer and King's Counsel (born 1940)

The Right Honourable The Lord Gifford KC

Member of the House of Lords
- Lord Temporal
- In office 21 June 1961 – 11 November 1999 as a hereditary peer
- Preceded by: The 5th Baron Gifford
- Succeeded by: Seat abolished (Note: Under the House of Lords Act 1999.)

Personal details
- Born: Anthony Maurice Gifford; 1 May 1940 (age 86)
- Education: Winchester College
- Alma mater: King's College, Cambridge
- Occupation: Barrister, politician and peer

Anthony Maurice Gifford, 6th Baron Gifford (born 1 May 1940), is a British hereditary peer and King's Counsel. He inherited the title of Baron Gifford on the death of his father, the 5th Baron, in April 1961. In 1970, Gifford was instrumental in establishing the first law centre in the UK.

== Biography ==
Anthony Gifford was educated at Winchester College and King's College, Cambridge, was called to the Bar in 1962 and took silk in 1983.

He was a co-founder of the North Kensington Neighbourhood Law Centre, Britain's first law centre, giving free legal advice. He founded Wellington Street Chambers and was its head for 15 years. He joined 8 King's Bench Walk in 1989 and from 2001 was head of Chambers. In 2006, the chambers relocated to 1 Mitre Court Buildings, remaining there until 2014.

He was Counsel for Paul Hill in the Guildford Four appeals and for Gerry Hunter in the Birmingham Six appeals.

Gifford was chairman of the Broadwater Farm inquiry and the Liverpool Eight inquiry, both of which investigated patterns of alleged racism and discrimination. He represented the family of James Wray at the Bloody Sunday Inquiry.

Cases in which he has been engaged include appeals involving trade unions, libel, contract and tort as well as criminal law. In 1991, he set up a firm of attorneys in Kingston, Jamaica, dividing his practice between Jamaica and the UK.

He was a prominent member of the anti-apartheid group Lawyers Against Apartheid.

Gifford sat on the Labour benches while in the House of Lords. The passing of the House of Lords Act 1999 removed his automatic right to sit in parliament, and he was excluded on 11 November 1999.

Gifford's autobiography, The Passionate Advocate, was published in 2007. A review in the Jamaica Gleaner stated: "Lord Gifford, a lifelong human-rights lawyer and advocate for the freedom struggle, has done more than his fair share to better the lot of the world's oppressed. The book really is an important study in the power of law, contemporary history and politics, international relations, slavery, and the resultant modern-day racism it bred."

== Reparations campaign ==
Gifford has campaigned in favour of reparations for slavery. At the first Pan-African Congress on Reparations, held in Abuja, Nigeria, in April 1993, he delivered a paper entitled "The legal basis of the claim for Reparations". Raising the issue in debate at the House of Lords on 14 March 1996, Gifford asked "Her Majesty's Government whether they will make appropriate reparation to African nations and to the descendants of Africans for the damage caused by the slave trade and the practice of slavery". Gifford is a member of the Jamaican reparations commission and has said of the reparations issue: "I would like to see it approached on a Caribbean-wide basis."

== Family life ==
Gifford married first on 22 March 1965 Katherine Ann Mundy, daughter of Dr Max Mundy of 75 Bedford Gardens, London. They had two children before they divorced in 1988:

- The Hon. Thomas Adam Gifford (born 1 December 1967)
- The Hon. Polly Ann Gifford (born 31 March 1969)

Gifford married secondly on 24 September 1988 Elean Roslyn Thomas, daughter of Right Reverend Bishop David Thomas of Kingston, Jamaica. They had one daughter before they divorced:

- The Hon. Sheba Chanel Gifford (born 1992)

Gifford married Tina Natalia Goulbourne, daughter of Clement Nathaniel Goulbourne, on 11 April 1998.

== Publications ==
- (with John Davies and Tony Richards) Political Policing in Wales; 1984 (Welsh Campaign for Civil & Political Liberties); ISBN 0-947740-00-7
- Where's the Justice? A Manifesto of Law Reform; 1985 (Penguin Books); ISBN 978-0140523584
- Supergrasses in Northern Ireland; 1985 (Liberty); ISBN 0-900137-21-5
- Report of the Broadwater Farm Inquiry; 1986 (Karia Press); ISBN 978-0946918607
- Loosen the Shackles: The report of the Liverpool 8 Inquiry; 1989 (Karia Press); ISBN 978-1854650153
- The Passionate Advocate; 2007 (Wildy, Simmonds and Hill Publishing); ISBN 978-1898029885

== Coat of arms ==
Coat of arms of Anthony Gifford, 6th Baron Gifford
Notes Coat of arms of the Gifford family Coronet A coronet of a Baron Crest A Panther's Head couped at the neck and affrontée between two Branches of Oak proper Escutcheon Azure a Chevron between three Stirrups with Leathers Or within a Bordure engrailed Argent pellety Supporters Dexter: a Bay Horse proper charged on the shoulder with a Portcullis Or; Sinister: a Greyhound Argent charged on the body with three Ermine Spots Motto Non Sine Numine (Not without God's assistance)

== Notes ==
Peerage of the United Kingdom
Preceded by Charles Gifford	Baron Gifford; 1961–present Member of the House of Lords (1961–1999)	Incumbent; Heir apparent: Hon. Thomas Gifford
