= Edric Gifford, 3rd Baron Gifford =

Victoria Cross recipient

Edric Frederick Gifford, 3rd Baron Gifford
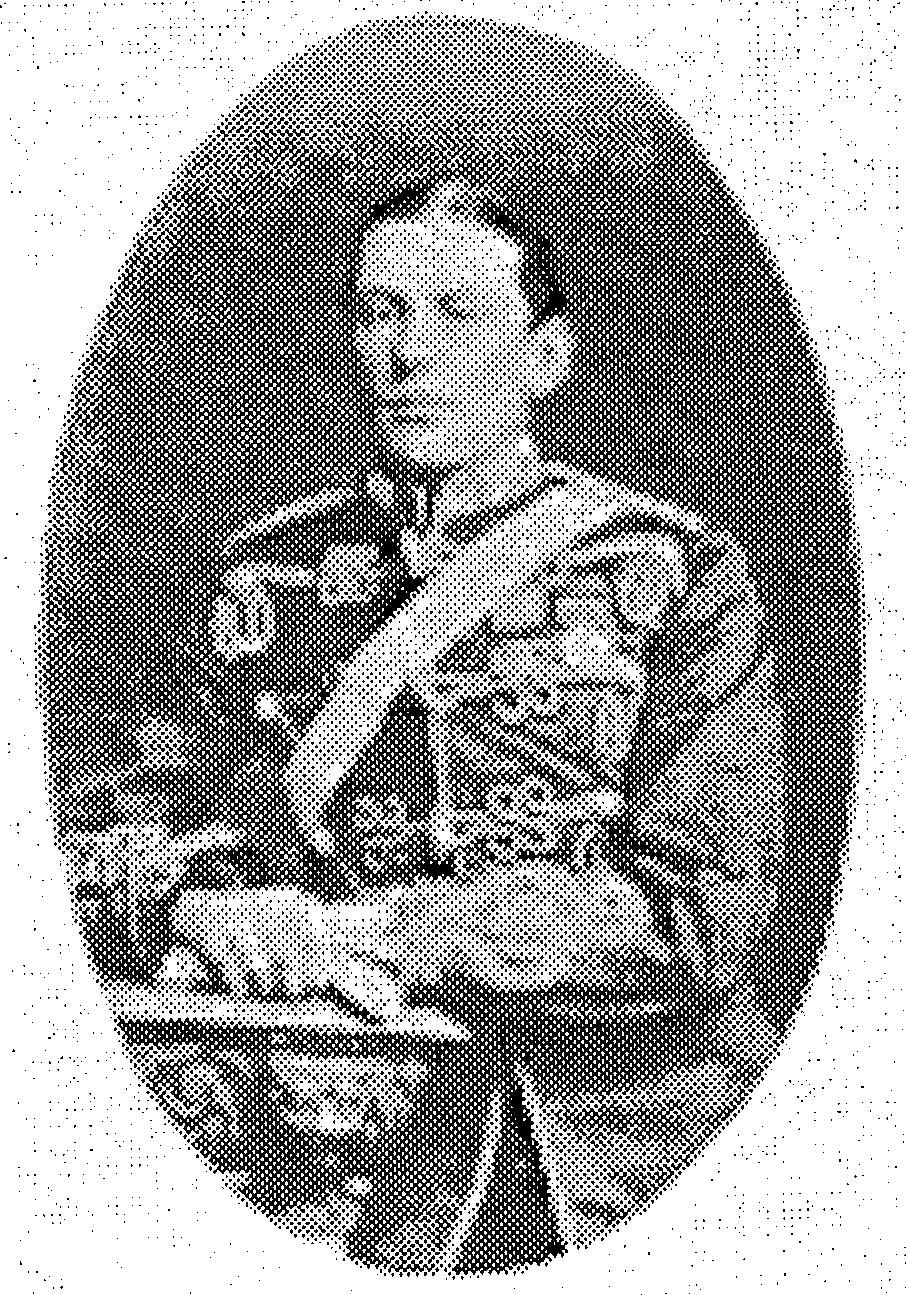
- Born: 5 July 1849; Ropley, Hampshire
- Died: 5 June 1911 (aged 61); Chichester, West Sussex
- Burial place: Fairfield Road Cemetery, Bosham
- Relatives: Robert Francis Gifford, 2nd Baron Gifford (father); Maurice Gifford, CMG (brother); John Fitzhardinge Paul Butler VC (nephew)
- Military career
- Allegiance: United Kingdom
- Branch: British Army
- Rank: Major
- Units: 83rd Regiment of Foot; 24th Regiment of Foot; 57th Regiment of Foot
- Conflicts: Third Anglo-Ashanti War
- Awards: Victoria Cross

Major Edric Frederick Gifford, 3rd Baron Gifford, VC (5 July 1849 – 5 June 1911) was an English recipient of the Victoria Cross, the highest and most prestigious award for gallantry in the face of the enemy that can be awarded to British and Commonwealth forces.

== Military career ==
Edric Gifford was born at Ropley in Hampshire on 5 July 1849. His father was Robert Francis Gifford, 2nd Baron Gifford, and his mother was Hon. Swinburne Frederica Charlotte FitzHardinge Berkeley. His brother was Maurice Gifford, CMG, who raised "Gifford's Horse" in the Second Matabele War.

He was educated at Harrow, and in 1869 entered the 83rd Foot. On the death of his father in 1872, he became 3rd Baron Gifford.

In 1874, at the age of 23, Gifford was a lieutenant in the 2nd Battalion, 24th Foot (later the South Wales Borderers), British Army during the Third Anglo-Ashanti War, when the events took place which resulted in the award of his Victoria Cross with the citation:

For his gallant conduct during the operations, and especially at the taking of Becquah. The Officer commanding the Expeditionary Force reports that Lord Gifford was in charge of the Scouts after the Army crossed the Prah,' and that it is no exaggeration to say that since the Adansi Hills were passed, he daily carried his life in his hand in the performance of his most dangerous duties. He hung upon the rear of the enemy, discovering their position, and ferreting out their intentions. With no other white man with him, he captured numerous prisoners; but Sir Garnet Wolseley brings Him forward for this mark of Royal favour most especially for his conduct at the taking of Becquah, into which place he penetrated with his scouts before the troops carried it, when his gallantry and courage were most conspicuous.

In 1876, Gifford left the 24th Foot, moving to the 57th Foot. In 1878 he was in Cyprus, and in 1879 he was aide-de-camp to Sir Garnet Wolseley in the Anglo-Zulu War. Shortly afterwards he retired from the Army as a brevet major.

== Colonial administrator ==
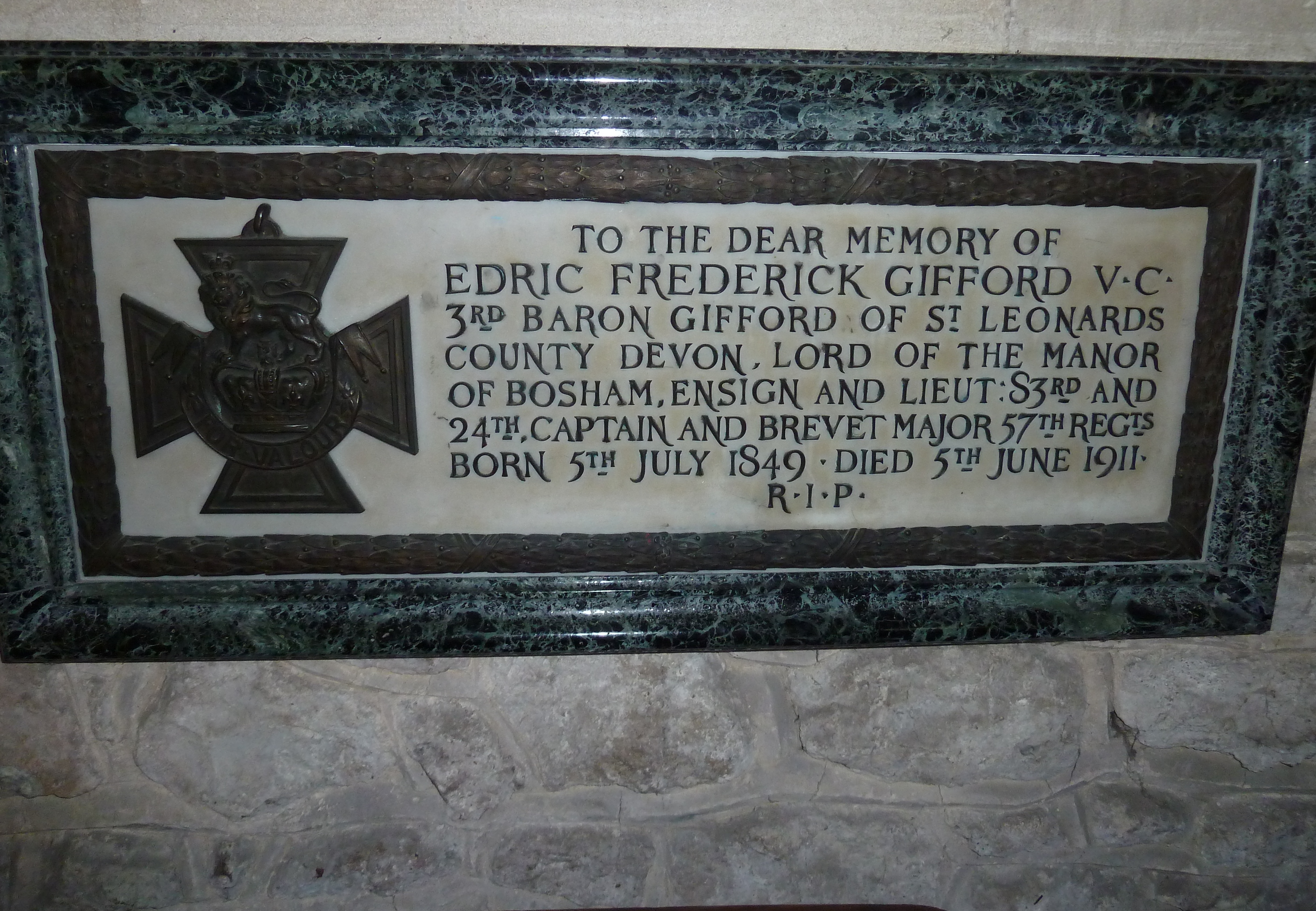
Gifford's memorial within Bosham Church

Gifford married Sophia Catherine Street, the daughter of Gen. John Alfred Street, in April 1880, then went to Western Australia, which was at that time a British colony. He arrived in Western Australia in October 1880 and immediately took up an appointment to the position of Colonial Secretary, and a nomination to the Western Australian Legislative Council. After leaving Western Australia in January 1883 following disputes with the Chief Justice, Sir Henry Wrenfordsley and the Governor Sir William Robinson, Gifford was Colonial Secretary of Gibraltar from 1883 to 1887. In 1889 he became a director of the British South Africa Company.

Edric Gifford died on 5 June 1911 in Chichester, England. He had no children. His nephew John Fitzhardinge Paul Butler also won a Victoria Cross.

Edric Gifford's Victoria Cross medal is not publicly held.

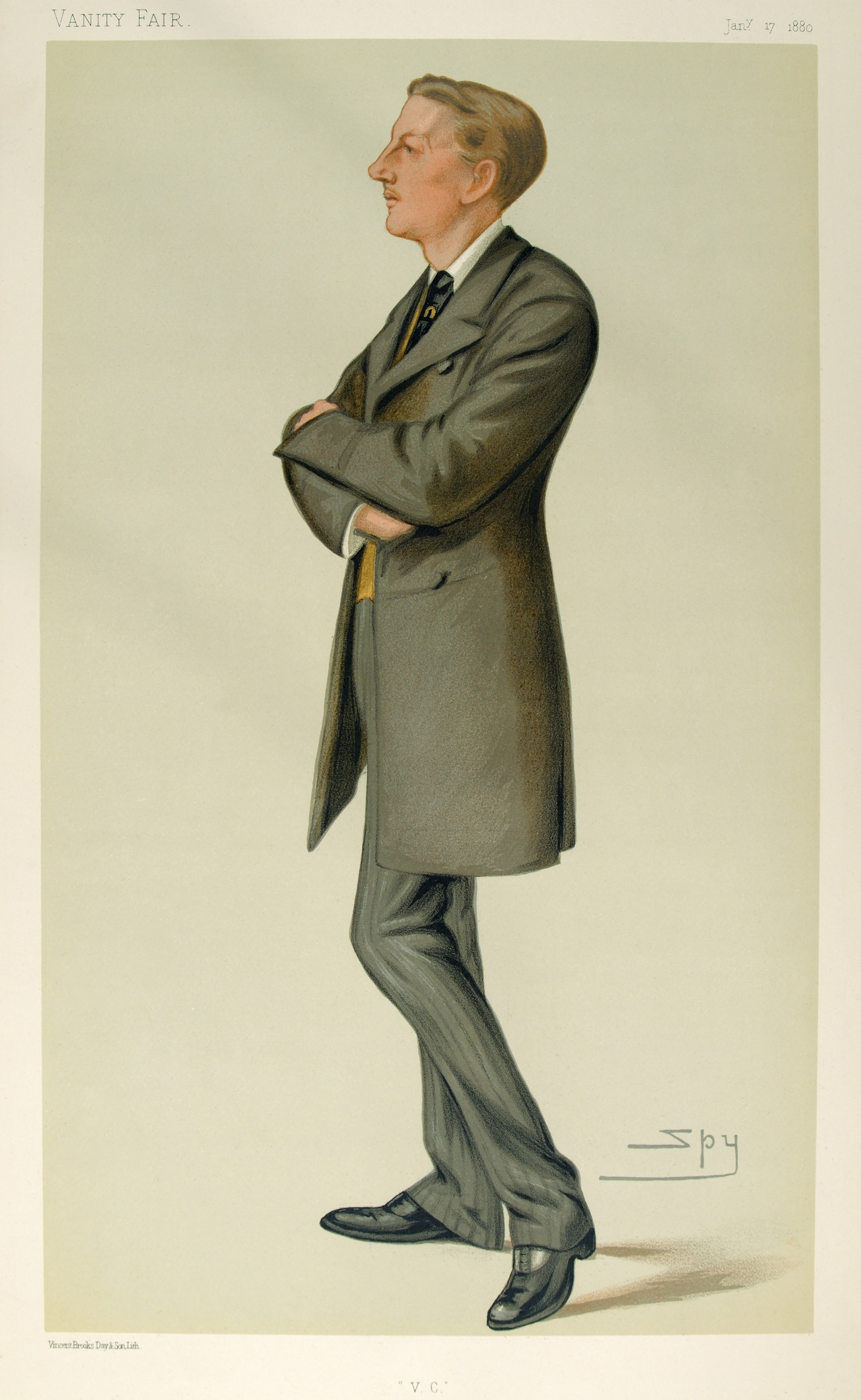
"V.C.". Caricature by Spy published in Vanity Fair in 1880.

== Coat of arms ==
Coat of arms of Edric Gifford, 3rd Baron Gifford
| Notes Coat of arms of the Gifford family Coronet A coronet of a Baron Crest A Panther's Head couped at the neck and affrontée between two Branches of Oak proper Escutcheon Azure a Chevron between three Stirrups with Leathers Or within a Bordure engrailed Argent pellety Supporters Dexter: a Bay Horse proper charged on the shoulder with a Portcullis Or; Sinister: a Greyhound Argent charged on the body with three Ermine Spots Motto Non Sine Numine (Not without God's assistance) |

== Notes ==
Peerage of the United Kingdom
| Preceded by Robert Gifford | Baron Gifford; 1872–1911 | Succeeded by Edgar Gifford |
