= Maurice Gifford =

British colonial Army officer (1859–1910)

The Hon. Maurice Gifford CMG
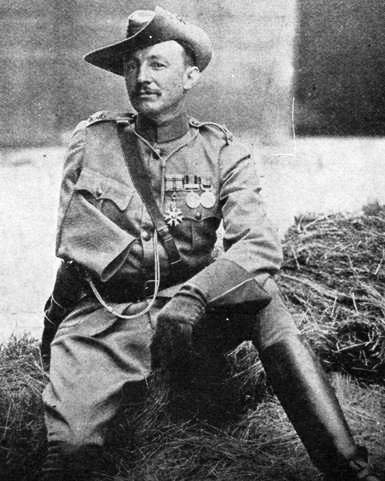
- Gifford, c. 1900.
- Born: Maurice Raymond Gifford; 5 May 1859; Ampney Park, Gloucester, United Kingdom
- Died: 1 July 1910 (aged 51); London, United Kingdom
- Military career
- Allegiance: British Army
- Service years: 1882–1893, 1893, 1896, 1900
- Rank: Colonel
- Units: French's Scouts, Canada 1882–1893; Scout, British South Africa Police, 1893; Rhodesian Horse, Imperial Yeomanry, 1900.
- Commands: Gifford's Horse, Bulawayo Field Force, Rhodesia, 1896.
- Conflicts: North-West Rebellion; Mahdist War; First Matabele War; Second Matabele War; Second Boer War: — Relief of Mafeking — Defence of Kimberly
- Awards: Order of St Michael and St George; North West Canada Medal; British South Africa Company Medal; Queen's South Africa Medal
- Other work: Correspondent to the Daily Telegraph, Merchant Service, general manager of Bechuanaland Exploration Company

Hon. Maurice Raymond Gifford CMG (5 May 1859 – 1 July 1910) was a British military officer.

== Biography ==
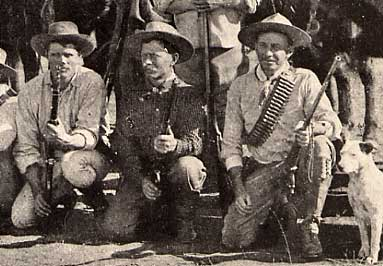
Gifford (right), Frederick Russell Burnham (middle), Matabeleland, 1893

Born on 5 May 1859 at Ampney Park, Gloucestershire, England, he was the son of Robert Francis Gifford, 2nd Baron Gifford, and the brother of Edric Gifford, 3rd Baron Gifford. On the completion of his education, he entered the Merchant Service, and was on board the training ship Worcester for three years.

In 1878, he entered the service of the British Steam Navigation Company, in which he remained until 1882, visiting many parts of the globe. That same year he fought in the Mahdist War and served as assistant correspondent to the Daily Telegraph at the time of the engagement of Tel-el-Kebir. He then went to Canada for 11 years and fought in the North-West Rebellion as one of "French's Scouts" under Lord Minto, earning the North West Canada Medal and clasp.

Next, Gifford went to South Africa and became general manager of the Bechuanaland Exploration Company and soon became involved in the First Matabele War, 1893. In the Second Matabele War, 1896, he was part of the Bulawayo Field Force during the Siege of Bulawayo, raised Gifford's Horse, and lost his right arm to a Nbatabele bullet.

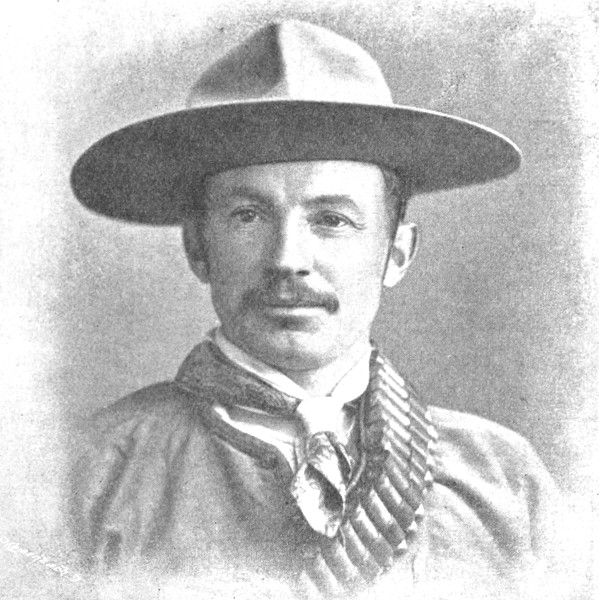
Maurice Gifford, Gifford's Horse, Matabele War 1896

In the Second Boer War, he was attached to the Imperial Yeomanry and was part of the Rhodesian Horse. He participated in the Relief of Mafeking.

=== Personal life ===
He married Marguerite Thorold, the daughter of Captain Thorold of Boothby Pagnell, on 21 September 1897. Among the presents that Gifford gave to his wife at the wedding was the bullet that cost him his arm. He set it in Matabele gold and arranged it so that the yellow metal formed a double-headed serpent. He lived at Boothby Hall.

On 1 July 1910, while undergoing a rest cure for nervous breakdown, Gifford met his death from a fire caused by his clothes being set alight by a cigarette. He had been cleaning his clothing with petrol just before the incident.

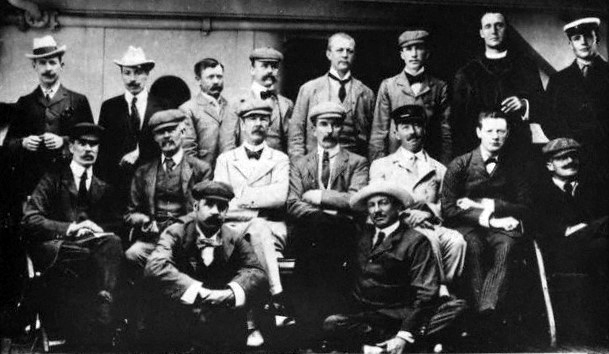
Returning from the Boer War on the RMS Dunottar Castle, July 1900. Standing L-R: Sir Byron Leighton, Claud Grenfel, Major Frederick Russell Burnham, Captain Gordon Forbes, Abe Bailey (his son John would marry Diana Churchill in 1932), next two unidentified, John Weston Brooke. Seated L-R: Major Bobby White, Lord Downe, General Sir Henry Edward Colvile (a year later Churchill as MP would demand an inquiry over his dismissal from South Africa), Major Harry White, Major Joe Laycock, Winston Churchill, Sir Charles Bentinck. Sitting L-R: unidentified, Col. Maurice Gifford (who had lost his arm in the Second Matabele War).
