= Robert Gifford, 1st Baron Gifford =

British lawyer, judge and politician

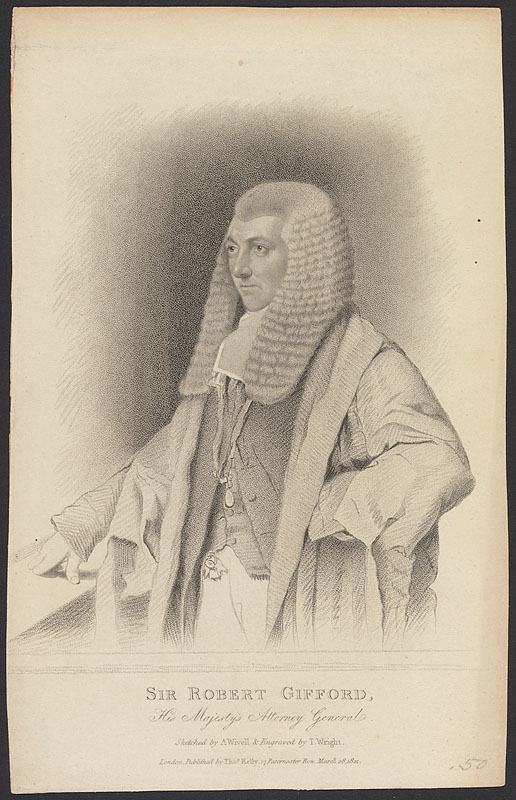
The 1st Lord Gifford. Engraving by Thomas Wright after Abraham Wivell's painting.

Robert Gifford, 1st Baron Gifford, PC (24 February 1779 – 4 September 1826), was a British lawyer, judge and politician.

Gifford was born in Exeter, and entered the Middle Temple in 1800. He was called to the bar in 1808, and joined the Western Circuit.

Gifford was elected to the House of Commons for Eye in 1817, a seat he represented until 1824, and served under the Earl of Liverpool as Solicitor General between 1817 and 1819 and as Attorney General between 1819 and 1824. The latter year he was raised to the peerage as Baron Gifford, of St Leonard's in the County of Devon, and appointed Lord Chief Justice of the Common Pleas. Lord Gifford only held this post for a short time and was then Master of the Rolls from 1824 until his early death in September 1826, aged 47. He was succeeded in the barony by his son Robert.

== Coat of arms ==
Coat of arms of Robert Gifford, 1st Baron Gifford
Notes Coat of arms of the Gifford family Coronet A coronet of a Baron Crest A Panther's Head couped at the neck and affrontée between two Branches of Oak proper Escutcheon Azure a Chevron between three Stirrups with Leathers Or within a Bordure engrailed Argent pellety Supporters Dexter: a Bay Horse proper charged on the shoulder with a Portcullis Or; Sinister: a Greyhound Argent charged on the body with three Ermine Spots Motto Non Sine Numine (Not without God's assistance)

Parliament of the United Kingdom
Preceded by Mark Singleton; Sir William Garrow	Member of Parliament for Eye; 1817–1824; With: Mark Singleton 1817–1820; Sir Miles Nightingall 1820–1824	Succeeded by Sir Miles Nightingall; Sir Edward Kerrison
Political offices
Preceded by Sir Samuel Shepherd	Solicitor General; 1817–1819	Succeeded by Sir John Singleton Copley
Preceded by Sir Samuel Shepherd	Attorney General; 1819–1824	Succeeded by Sir John Singleton Copley
Legal offices
Preceded by Sir Robert Dallas	Chief Justice of the Common Pleas; 1824	Succeeded by Sir William Best
Preceded by Sir Thomas Plumer	Master of the Rolls; 1824–1826	Succeeded by Sir John Singleton Copley
Peerage of the United Kingdom
New creation	Baron Gifford; 1824–1826	Succeeded by Robert Francis Gifford
