= Robert Gifford, 2nd Baron Gifford =

British peer

Robert Francis Gifford, 2nd Baron Gifford (19 March 1817 – 13 May 1872) was a British peer.

He was the son of Robert Gifford, 1st Baron Gifford. He was educated at Trinity College, Cambridge and served as an officer in the British Army. He succeeded in the barony on 4 September 1826 and assumed his seat in the House of Lords.

On 2 April 1845, he married the Hon. Frederica-Charlotte-Fitz-Hardinge (b. 15 April 1825, d. 25 November 1920), eldest daughter of Maurice Berkeley, 1st Baron FitzHardinge, and had issue:

- Eva Gifford (21 February 1846 – 6 April 1915), married 24 May 1866, Major-General Sir Henry Trotter, Grenadier Guards
- Harriet Ella Gifford (24 January 1847 – 12 February 1942), married 5 January 1865, Lt-Col. the Hon. Archibald-Henry Douglas-Pennant
- Emily Gifford (19 December 1847 – 28 January 1926), married 2 June 1868, Robert-Thomas-Napier Speir, Esq., of Guidées, Perthshire
- Edric Frederick Gifford, 3rd Baron Gifford, VC (5 July 1849 – 5 June 1911)
- Evelyn Mary Gifford (20 November 1850 – 2 April 1947), married 31 August 1872, Thomas Arthur Fitzhardinge Kingscote, Esq., 3rd son of Thomas Henry Kingscote, Esq., by his 2nd wife, the Hon. Harriet Mary Anne Bloomfield, eldest dau. of Benjamin, 1st Lord Bloomfield
- Eleanor Gifford (21 March 1852 – 8 February 1939), married 5 November 1873, Edward-M. Dansey, Esq., Capt. 1st Life Guards.
- Edward Robert Gifford, R.N. (3 November 1853 – 24 March 1878)
- Elspeth Fitz Hardinge Gifford (25 July 1855 – 10 December 1913)
- Edgar Berkeley Gifford, 4th Baron Gifford, Lieut. S. Gloucester Militia (8 March 1857 – 29 January 1937)
- Maurice Raymond Gifford, CMG, Col. (5 May 1859 – 1 July 1910), married Marguerite Thorold, the daughter of Capt Thorold of Boothby
- Elton-Vivian (14 April 1861 – 1893)

== Coat of arms ==
Coat of arms of Robert Gifford, 2nd Baron Gifford
Notes Coat of arms of the Gifford family Coronet A coronet of a Baron Crest A Panther's Head couped at the neck and affrontée between two Branches of Oak proper Escutcheon Azure a Chevron between three Stirrups with Leathers Or within a Bordure engrailed Argent pellety Supporters Dexter: a Bay Horse proper charged on the shoulder with a Portcullis Or; Sinister: a Greyhound Argent charged on the body with three Ermine Spots Motto Non Sine Numine (Not without God's assistance)

Peerage of the United Kingdom
Preceded by Robert Gifford	Baron Gifford; 1826–1872	Succeeded by Edric Gifford
