= General Officers of World War I =

Painting by John Singer Sargent

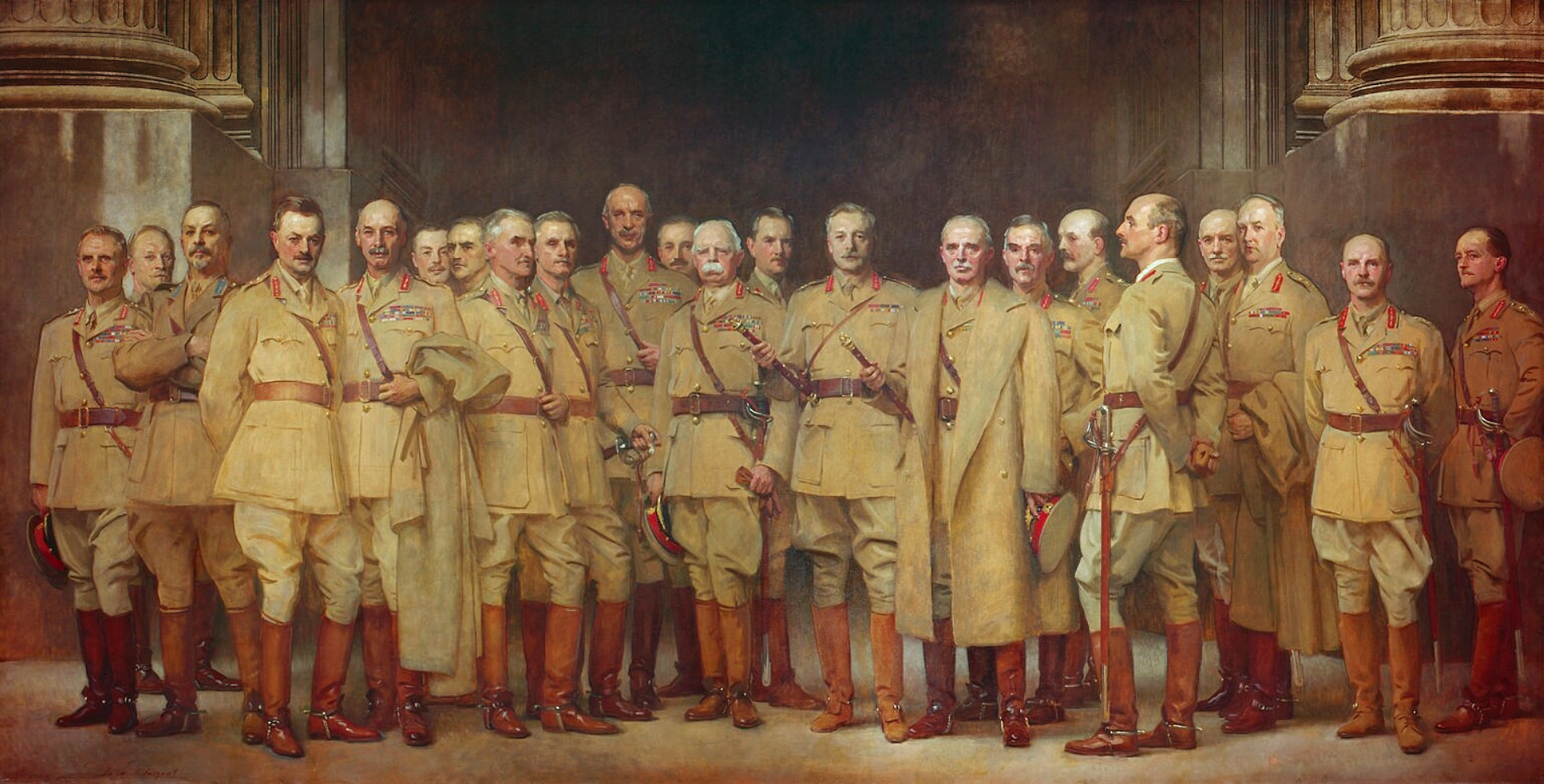
- Artist: John Singer Sargent
- Year: 1922
- Medium: Oil on canvas
- Dimensions: 299.7 cm × 528.3 cm (118.0 in × 208.0 in)
- Location: National Portrait Gallery, London

General Officers of World War I (originally entitled Some General Officers of the Great War) is an oil painting by John Singer Sargent, completed in 1922. It was commissioned by South African financier Sir Abraham Bailey, 1st Baronet to commemorate the generals who commanded British and British Empire armies in the First World War.

== Background ==
Sargent was initially unwilling to take on such a large project, but took the commission in January 1919 and began work in August 1920, after he completed his similarly huge painting, Gassed. He was also working on murals for the Museum of Fine Arts in Boston, Massachusetts.

Sargent found it difficult to find a suitable composition for so many full-length portraits, and Sargent himself foresaw a "horrible failure". The resulting painting is unsatisfactory, with 22 men in khaki uniforms standing like pillars in a crowd in front of an anonymous brownish void, possibly an open doorway, with the bases of fluted pillars to either side. Sargent described it as "painting them all standing up in a vacuum". They look forward with blank stares, with no discernible purpose, almost as if each was unaware of the others around him.

The completed painting measures 118 × 208 inches (3.0 × 5.3 m). It was exhibited at the Royal Academy in 1922.

Bailey commissioned two other commemorative portraits, Statesmen of World War I by Sir James Guthrie, and Naval Officers of World War I by Sir Arthur Stockdale Cope. Bailey paid £5,000 for each of the three paintings and donated all three to the National Portrait Gallery.

== Generals ==
The painting depicts 22 of the approximately 1,500 brigadier-generals, major-generals, lieutenant-generals, generals, and field marshals who served in the British and Imperial armies in the First World War. All but two of the subjects reached the rank of at least lieutenant-general, and most were commanders of armies or army corps. The only two divisional commanders are Major-General Lukin and Major-General Russell.

From left to right, they are:

1. Field Marshal William Birdwood, 1st Baron Birdwood (commander of the Australian and New Zealand Army Corps from 1914 to 1916, and of the British Fifth Army in 1918)
2. Field Marshal Jan Smuts (commander of Imperial forces in east Africa in 1916)
3. General Louis Botha (commander in South West Africa) (blue lapel flashes)
4. Field Marshal Julian Byng, 1st Viscount Byng of Vimy (commander of the British Third Army from 1917 to 1919)
5. General Henry Rawlinson, 1st Baron Rawlinson (commander of the British Fourth Army from 1916 to 1919) (carrying a coat)
6. Major-General Sir Henry Lukin (commander of the South African Brigade from 1915 to 1916, and of the 9th (Scottish) Division from 1916 to 1918)
7. General Sir John Monash (commander of the Australian Corps from 1917 to 1918)
8. General Henry Horne, 1st Baron Horne (commander of the British First Army from September 1917)
9. Field Marshal George Milne, 1st Baron Milne (commander of British forces in Salonika from 1916 to 1919)
10. Field Marshal Sir Henry Wilson, 1st Baronet (Chief of the Imperial General Staff from February 1918)
11. Major-General Sir Andrew Hamilton Russell (commander of the New Zealand Division from 1916 to 1919)
12. Field Marshal Herbert Plumer, 1st Viscount Plumer (commander of the British Second Army from 1915 to 1917 and in 1918) (white moustache)
13. General Sir John Cowans (Quartermaster-General to the Forces from 1912 to 1919)
14. Field Marshal Douglas Haig, 1st Earl Haig (commander-in-chief of the British Expeditionary Force in France from December 1915 to 1919) (with baton)
15. Field Marshal John French, 1st Earl of Ypres (commander-in-chief of the British Expeditionary Force in France in 1914 to December 1915) (with baton, wearing coat)
16. Field Marshal Sir William Robertson, 1st Baronet (Chief of the Imperial General Staff from December 1915 to February 1918)
17. Lieutenant-General Sir Stanley Maude (commander of British forces in Mesopotamia from 1916 to his death in 1917)
18. Field Marshal Edmund Allenby, 1st Viscount Allenby (commander of the British Third Army in 1916 to 1917, and the Egyptian Expeditionary Force in the Middle East) (turning away, with sword)
19. Lieutenant-General Sir William Marshall (commander of British forces in Mesopotamia from 1917 to 1919)
20. General Sir Arthur Currie (commander of the Canadian Corps from June 1917 to 1918) (carrying coat)
21. Field Marshal Rudolph Lambart, 10th Earl of Cavan (commander of the Italian Tenth Army from March 1918)
22. General Sir Charles Macpherson Dobell (commander in Cameroon from 1914 to 1916, and then in the Middle East until 1917)

The generals are mostly British, but some representatives from the British Empire are also included: Field Marshal Smuts, General Botha and Major-General Lukin from South Africa, Generals Currie and Dobell from Canada, General Monash from Australia, and Major-General Russell from New Zealand.

A list of potential subjects was compiled by Evan Charteris and Lewis Vernon Harcourt, 1st Viscount Harcourt, and approved by Bailey. Some were deliberately omitted (for example, General Ian Hamilton was blamed for the failure at Gallipoli and left out). Others prominent army commanders to be left out include Horace Smith-Dorrien, Hubert Gough, Charles Monro, Richard Haking, William Peyton, Charles Kavanagh, John Nixon, Percy Lake, and Charles Townshend; administrative officers such as Stanley von Donop, William Furse, Nevil Macready, George Macdonogh, Ronald Charles Maxwell and Travers Clarke, several Chiefs of the Imperial General Staff – Charles W. H. Douglas, James Wolfe Murray, and Archibald Murray – and army chiefs of staff, such as Charles "Tim" Harington, Archibald Montgomery-Massingberd, Launcelot Kiggell and Herbert Lawrence. There are no officers from the Royal Flying Corps, such as Hugh Trenchard, David Henderson and John Salmond, or the Tank Corps, such as Hugh Elles.

== See also ==
- List of works by John Singer Sargent
- Naval Officers of World War I
