= Statesmen of World War I =

1930 painting by James Guthrie

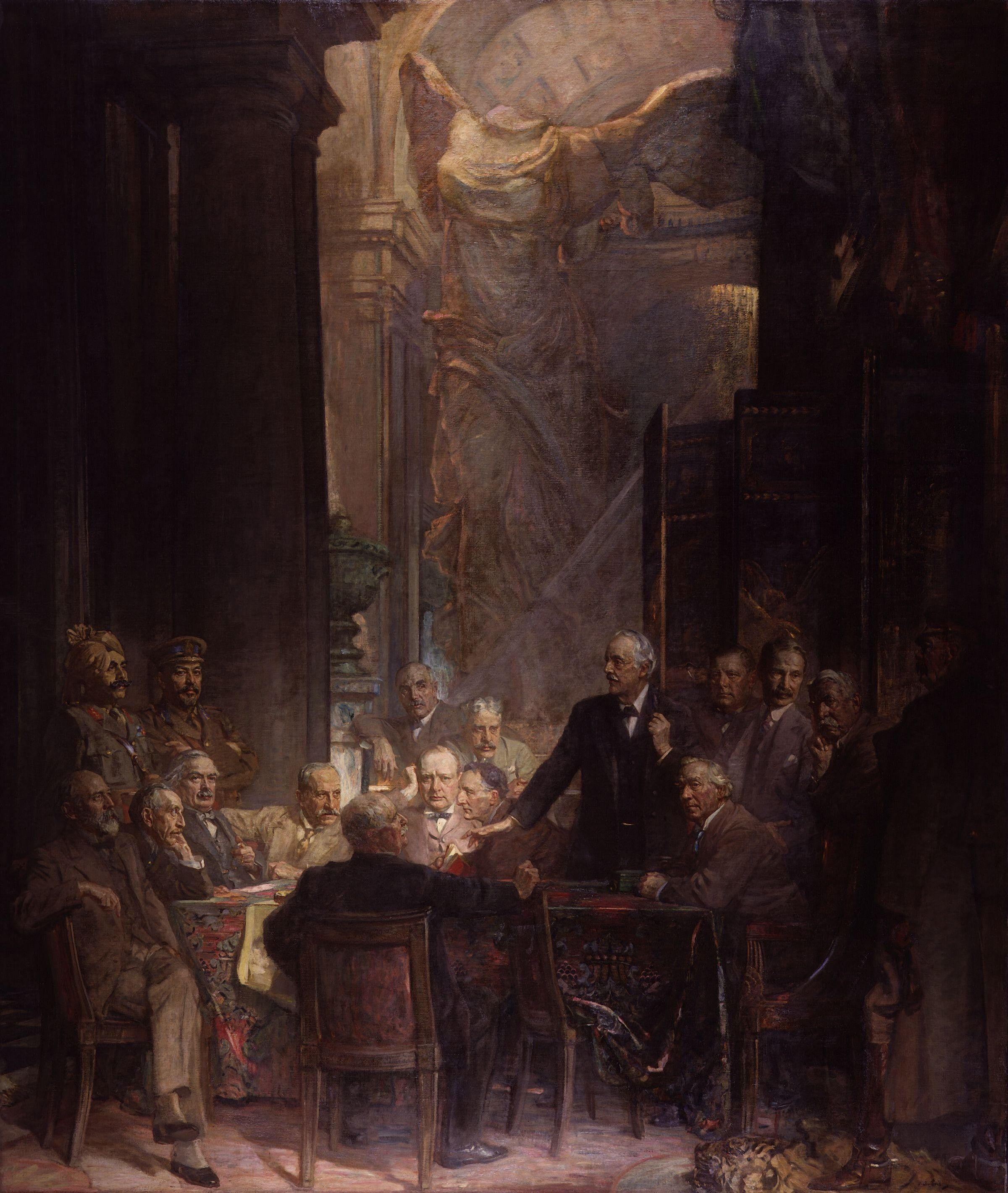
Sir James Guthrie, Statesmen of World War I, 1930, National Portrait Gallery, London

Statesmen of World War I is an oil on canvas painting by Sir James Guthrie, completed in 1930, shortly before Guthrie's death. It was commissioned by South African financier Sir Abraham Bailey, 1st Baronet to commemorate the politicians and statesmen of Britain and its Dominions who held office during the First World War. It was donated to the National Portrait Gallery in 1930, shortly after it was completed.

== Background ==
Bailey commissioned two other commemorative portraits, General Officers of World War I (originally entitled Some General Officers of the Great War) by John Singer Sargent, and Naval Officers of World War I by Sir Arthur Stockdale Cope. Bailey paid £5,000 for each of the three paintings and donated all three to the National Portrait Gallery. The third painting, of statesmen, was first offered to Sir William Orpen, but Orpen declined as he had already been commissioned as the official British artist of the Versailles Peace Conference (see, for example, The Signing of Peace in the Hall of Mirrors). Sargent suggested Guthrie instead.

As preparatory work, Guthrie painted a study of each subject separately, considerably delaying the process. He held sittings in the springs and early summers of 1919 to 1921. After a delay caused by Guthrie's illness, the work was first exhibited at the Scottish National Gallery in Edinburgh in early 1930. Guthrie died in September 1930 before he could complete the final finishing touches before it went on display in London in October 1930. His 17 oil studies and an oil sketch of the composition were donated to Scottish National Portrait Gallery. Guthrie's study of Louis Botha was used by Sargent in making his painting of general officers.

== Painting ==
The work measures 156 × 132 inches (400 × 340 cm). It is a group portrait of seventeen figures, some seated and some standing. Unlike the companion paintings by Sargent and Cope, which adopt a landscape format to accommodate the many subjects, Guthrie used a portrait format. The subjects are depicted as if in conference around a table in a large hall, in the shadow of a sculpture based on the Winged Victory of Samothrace, with Doric columns to either side and a coffered vault above.

The individuals depicted are, from left to right, starting with those seated on the left side of the table:

- Sir Joseph Cook, former Prime Minister of Australia (1913–1914), Leader of the Opposition (Australia) (1914–1916), Minister for the Navy (1917–1920) (with beard)
- Billy Hughes, Prime Minister of Australia (1915–1923) (head resting on hand)
- David Lloyd George, Chancellor of the Exchequer (1908–1915), Minister of Munitions (1915–1916), Secretary of State for War (1916), Prime Minister of the United Kingdom (1916–1922)
- Alfred Milner, 1st Viscount Milner, Secretary of State for War (1918–1919) (leaning forward)
- William Massey, Prime Minister of New Zealand (1912–1925) (seated facing away)
- Winston Churchill, First Lord of the Admiralty (1911–1915), Minister of Munitions (1917–1919) (later Prime Minister of the United Kingdom, 1940–1945 and 1951–1955) (illuminated)
- Edward Grey, 1st Viscount Grey of Fallodon, Foreign Secretary (1905–1916) (in profile with aquiline nose)

Standing behind Lloyd George are:

- Ganga Singh, Maharaja of Bikaner, only "non-White" member of the Imperial War Cabinet
- Louis Botha, Prime Minister of the Union of South Africa (1910–1919)

Behind Churchill are:

- George Barnes, leader of the National Democratic and Labour Party
- Sir Robert Borden, Prime Minister of Canada (1911–1920)

To their right are:

- Arthur Balfour, 1st Earl of Balfour, former Prime Minister of the United Kingdom (1902–1905); First Lord of the Admiralty (1915–1916) and Foreign Secretary (1916–1919) (standing adlocutio in a black suit)
- H. H. Asquith, 1st Earl of Oxford and Asquith, Prime Minister of the United Kingdom (1908–1916) (sitting in front)
- Sir Eric Geddes, First Lord of the Admiralty (1917–1919) (behind, cleanshaven)
- Bonar Law, Leader of the Opposition (United Kingdom) (1911–1915), Secretary of State for the Colonies (1915–1916), Chancellor of the Exchequer (1916–1919) (later Prime Minister of the United Kingdom, 1922–1923) (dark moustache)
- Edward Morris, 1st Baron Morris, Prime Minister of Newfoundland (1909–1917) (white moustache, in the shadows)
- Herbert Kitchener, 1st Earl Kitchener, Secretary of State for War (1914–1916) (in the shadows)

Bailey decided that the painting should include British and Dominion civilian leaders in office at the beginning and the end of the First World War. It includes Prime Ministers of Australia, Canada, Newfoundland, and New Zealand, and the Prime Ministers, Foreign Secretaries, Secretaries of War, and First Lords of the Admiralty of the United Kingdom, together with two leaders of the British Conservative and Labour parties. The Maharaja of Bikaner, a member of the Imperial War Cabinet and the Indian delegate to the Versailles Peace Conference, stands to the left next to Botha, both in military uniform.

Kitchener stands in military uniform on the far right, away from the others with his profile in deep shadow. He died in the sinking of HMS Hampshire in 1916, so this portrait was posthumous.
