= Naval Officers of World War I =

1921 painting by Arthur Stockdale Cope

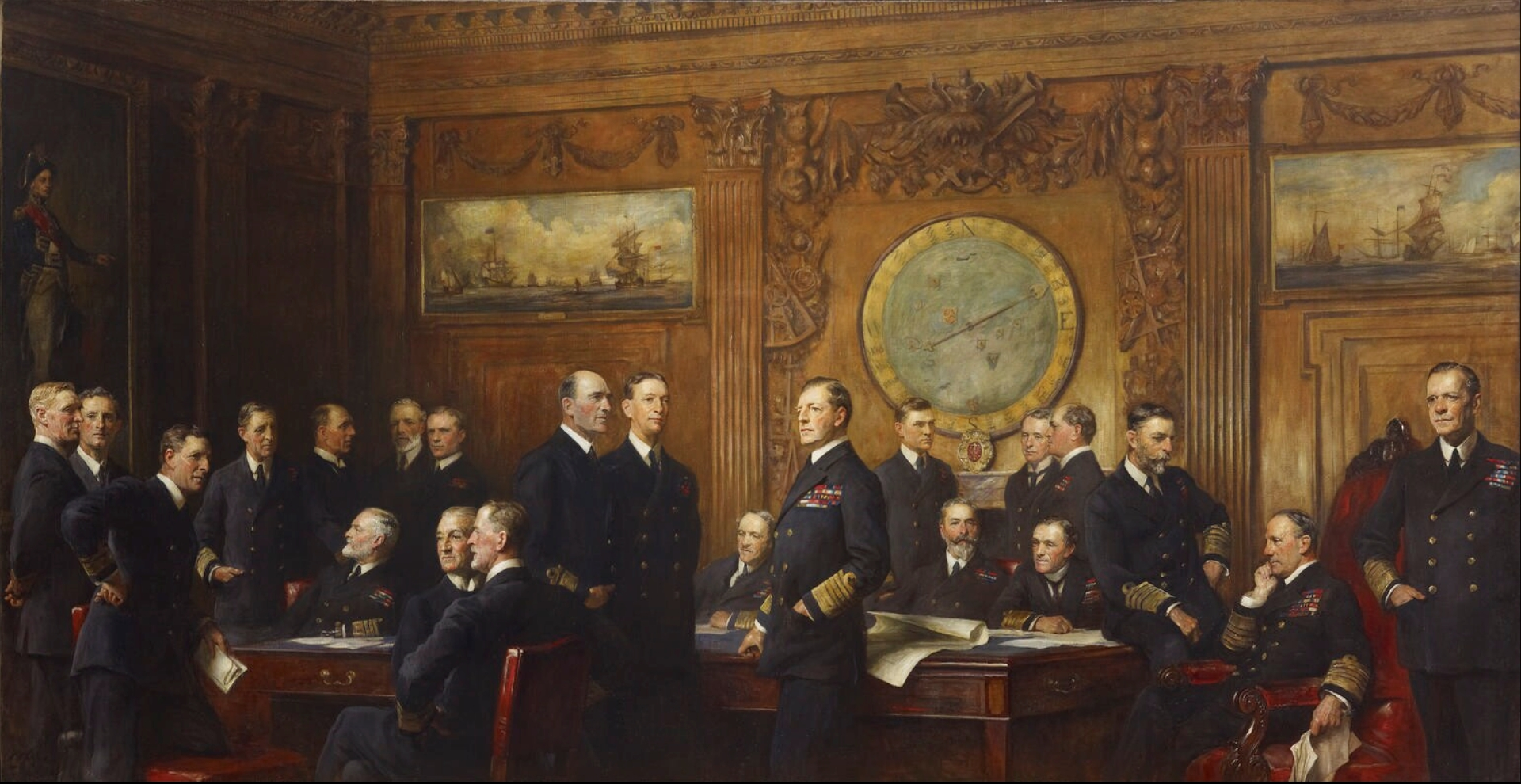
Naval Officers of World War I (1921) by Arthur Stockdale Cope

Naval Officers of World War I is a large oil on canvas group portrait painting by Sir Arthur Stockdale Cope, completed in 1921. It was commissioned by South African financier Sir Abraham Bailey, 1st Baronet to commemorate the Royal Navy officers who commanded British fleets in the First World War. Cope's painting was first exhibited at the Royal Academy summer exhibition in 1921 and donated to the National Portrait Gallery that year.

== Background ==
Bailey commissioned two other commemorative portraits, General Officers of World War I (originally entitled Some General Officers of the Great War) by John Singer Sargent, and Statesmen of World War I by Sir James Guthrie. Bailey paid £5,000 for each of the three paintings and donated all three to the National Portrait Gallery.

== Painting ==
The painting measures 104 × 202.5 inches (264 × 514 cm). It depicts 22 senior officers of the Royal Navy who served during the First World War. Cope worked from sketches of each subject, and set them in the wood-panelled Admiralty Board Room at the Old Admiralty Building in Whitehall. There is a wind dial on one wall, with paintings of naval scenes to either side. On the wall to the left is a portrait of Horatio Nelson by Leonardo Guzzardi, near a group of three officers who were killed in action during the war: Sir Robert Arbuthnot, 4th Baronet, Sir Christopher Cradock and Sir Horace Hood. Viscount Jellicoe is shown to the right, sitting on a red leather chair, in conversation with his chief of staff, Sir Charles Madden, 1st Baronet

The officers depicted are, from left to right:

1. Admiral Sir Edwyn Alexander-Sinclair, commander of the 1st Light Cruiser Squadron from 1915, then of the 6th Light Cruiser Squadron from 1917
2. Admiral Sir Walter Henry Cowan, 1st Baronet, commander of the 1st Light Cruiser Squadron from June 1917 in the Baltic
3. Admiral of the Fleet Sir Osmond Brock, Beatty's Chief of Staff at the Grand Fleet from 1916 to 1919
4. Admiral Sir William Goodenough, commander of the 2nd Light Cruiser Squadron from 1913 to 1916
5. Rear-Admiral Sir Robert Arbuthnot, 4th Baronet, commander of the 1st Cruiser Squadron from January 1915, killed at the Battle of Jutland in May 1916
6. Admiral Sir Montague Browning, commander of the 3rd Cruiser Squadron to 1916, then Commander-in-Chief, North America and West Indies from 1916 to 1918, and then commander of the 4th Battle Squadron
7. Admiral Sir Christopher Cradock, Commander-in-Chief, North America and West Indies Station until his death at the Battle of Coronel in November 1914
8. Rear-Admiral Sir Horace Hood, commander of the 3rd Battlecruiser Squadron from March 1915 to his death at the Battle of Jutland in May 1916
9. Admiral of the Fleet Sir John de Robeck, 1st Baronet, commander in the Dardanelles from March 1915, and then commander of the 2nd Battle Squadron from November 1916
10. Admiral Sir William Pakenham, commander of the 2nd Battlecruiser Squadron from March 1915 to September 1916, then commander of the Australian Fleet to January 1917, and then commander of the Battle Cruiser Fleet from June 1917
11. Admiral of the Fleet Sir Reginald Tyrwhitt, 1st Baronet, commander of the Harwich Force of destroyers
12. Admiral of the Fleet Roger Keyes, 1st Baron Keyes, commander of the Dover Patrol from January 1918
13. Admiral of the Fleet Sir Cecil Burney, 1st Baronet, commander of the Channel Fleet from August to December 1914, then commander of the 1st Battle Squadron, and then Second Sea Lord from November 1916 to September 1917, and then Commander-in-Chief, Coast of Scotland
14. Admiral of the Fleet David Beatty, 1st Earl Beatty, commander of the 1st Battlecruiser Squadron from 1913 to December 1916, and then Commander-in-Chief of the Grand Fleet
15. Vice-Admiral Sir Trevylyan Napier, commander of the 2nd Light Cruiser Squadron from December 1914, then the 3rd Light Cruiser Squadron from February 1915, then the 1st Light Cruiser Squadron from July 1917, and commander of the Light Cruiser Force from January 1918
16. Admiral of the Fleet Prince Louis of Battenberg, 1st Marquess of Milford Haven, First Sea Lord from December 1912 to October 1914
17. Admiral Sir Hugh Evan-Thomas, commander of the 5th Battle Squadron from October 1915 to October 1918
18. Admiral of the Fleet Sir Doveton Sturdee, 1st Baronet, commander at the Battle of the Falkland Islands in 1914 and then commander of the 4th Battle Squadron (seated at table)
19. Admiral Sir Arthur Leveson, commander of the Australian Fleet from January 1917 to September 1918
20. Admiral of the Fleet Sir Charles Madden, 1st Baronet, Jellicoe's Chief of Staff at the Grand Fleet from 1914 to 1916, then commander of the 1st Battle Squadron from December 1916 (sitting on edge of table)
21. Admiral of the Fleet John Jellicoe, 1st Earl Jellicoe, Commander-in-Chief of the Grand Fleet from 1914 to 1916, and then First Sea Lord from December 1916 to July 1917
22. Admiral of the Fleet Rosslyn Wemyss, 1st Baron Wester Wemyss, First Sea Lord from December 1917 to November 1919

The selection of officers depicted was largely the suggestion of Sir Oswyn Murray, Secretary to the Admiralty, who proposed 20 admirals who had served at sea during the war. To his list were added the First Sea Lords in 1914 and in 1918, Prince Louis of Battenberg and Rosslyn Wemyss. Notable omissions include Admiral of the Fleet John Fisher, 1st Baron Fisher and Admiral of the Fleet Sir Henry Jackson, both of whom held the post of First Sea Lord during the war, Fisher from November 1914 to May 1915 and Jackson from May 1915 to December 1916. Fisher was omitted at his own request. Also left out were Dudley de Chair and Reginald Tupper, who commanded the 10th Cruiser Squadron in the Northern Patrol.

The painting is held by the National Portrait Gallery but was not exhibited for several decades due to its poor condition. After restoration, it went back on display in May 2014 to commemorate the centenary of the beginning of the First World War.
