= Bailey baronets =

Baronetcy in the Baronetage of the United Kingdom

There have been two baronetcies created for people surnamed "Bailey", both in the Baronetage of the United Kingdom and extant as of 2010.

== Glanusk Park (1852) ==
The Bailey baronetcy, of Glanusk Park in the County of Brecon, was created in the Baronetage of the United Kingdom on 5 July 1852.

== Cradock (1919) ==
The Bailey baronetcy, of Cradock in the Province of the Cape of Good Hope in the Union of South Africa, was created in the Baronetage of the United Kingdom on 12 February 1919 for the South African diamond magnate and politician Abe Bailey. His eldest son, the second Baronet, married Diana Churchill, eldest child of Winston Churchill. However, they were divorced in 1935. The second Baronet was succeeded by his half-brother, the third Baronet. He was the son of the first Baronet by his second wife the Honourable Mary Westenra, an aviator. The third Baronet was also an influential businessman. As of 2010 the title is held by his son, the fourth Baronet, who succeeded in 2009.

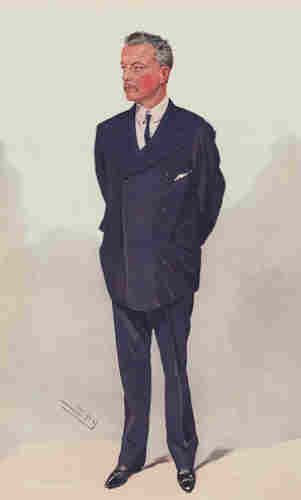
Sir Abe Bailey, 1st Baronet, by "Spy" (Leslie Ward)

Bailey baronets
- Crest: A demi-female figure with arms extended Proper habited Azure trimmed at the collar cuffs and shoulders Argent holding in each hand a sprig of mimosa as in the arms.
- Shield: Argent on a fess between three martlets Gules a bezant between two sprigs of mimosa Proper.
- Motto: Virtus Castellum Meum

- Sir Abraham Bailey, 1st Baronet (1864–1940)
- Sir John Milner Bailey, 2nd Baronet (15 June 1900, East Grinstead – 13 February 1946, Cape Town, South Africa). Bailey married 12 December 1932 (and divorced 21 August 1935) Diana Churchill, daughter of Winston Churchill; married, secondly, Muriel Serefin Mullins, daughter of James Henry Mullins, 18 October 1939 (divorced 1945); married, thirdly, Stella Mary Chiappini, daughter of Charles Du Plessis Chiappini, 4 May 1945; died without issue.
- Sir Derrick Thomas Louis Bailey, 3rd Baronet (1918–2009)
- Sir John Richard Bailey, 4th Baronet (born 11 June 1947). Bailey is the son of the 3rd Baronet and Nancy Stormonth Darling. He was educated at Winchester College and Christ's College, Cambridge. He married Philippa Jane Pearson Gregory and has three children.

The heir apparent is the current baronet's eldest son, James Edward Bailey (born 7 September 1983).
