= Beezy Bailey =

South African artist

- Born: 1962,July,21; Johannesburg, South Africa
- Citizenship: South Africa
- Education: Byam Shaw School of Art (B.FA)
- Occupation: Artist
- Father: Jim Bailey

William James Sebastian "Beezy" Bailey (born 21 July 1962) is a South African artist who works in various media, including painting, sculpture, drawing, printmaking and ceramics. He has worked full-time as an artist for 30 years, with over 20 one-man shows in London, Johannesburg and Cape Town as well as group shows around the world.

== Early life and education ==
Bailey was born in 1962 in Johannesburg, South Africa. His father was Jim Bailey, the son of mining magnate Abe Bailey and the proprietor of Drum.

He received a fine arts degree from Byam Shaw School of Art in United Kingdom (London) in 1986, after studying two years of life drawing and then a third in printmaking, painting, and sculpture.

== Artwork ==
Bailey has worked with musicians, including David Bowie, Brian Eno, Dave Matthews and Arno Carstens, and with photographer Zwelethu Mthethwa.

His work has often been political and attracted controversy.

Bailey's work is represented in several art collections, including the David Bowie Art Collection.

== Joyce Ntobe ==
Frustrated with "increasingly prevalent affirmative action", in 1991 Bailey submitted two artworks to an exhibition. One was with the traditional Beezy Bailey signature (rejected), the other signed Joyce Ntobe. The latter is now in the South African National Gallery as part of its permanent collection. When the curator of the Gallery was writing a paper about three black women artists, Joyce Ntobe being one, Bailey revealed the truth. He has since exhibited work under the name Joyce Ntobe.

== Personal life ==
Bailey is married with two children and lives in Cape Town and London.

== See also ==
- Feb 3, Rainbow Nation Peace Ritual
- Red Jacket
