= James R. A. Bailey =

South African publisher and writer (1919–2000)

Jim Bailey
- Born: James Richard Abe Bailey; 21 October 1919; London, England
- Died: 29 February 2000 (aged 80); Lanseria, South Africa
- Education: Winchester College; Christ Church, Oxford
- Occupations: Writer, poet and publisher
- Known for: Founder of Drum
- Children: 4, including Beezy
- Parents: Abe Bailey (father); Mary Bailey (mother)

James Richard Abe "Jim" Bailey, CBE, DFC (23 October 1919 – 29 February 2000) was an Anglo-South African World War II fighter pilot, writer, poet and publisher. He was the founder of Drum, the most widely read magazine in Africa.

== Biography ==
Born in London, England, on 23 October 1919, Bailey was the son of Sir Abe Bailey and pioneer aviator Dame Mary Bailey, and was educated at Winchester College and Christ Church, Oxford. At the outbreak of the Second World War, he was called up from the Oxford University Air Squadron and joined the Royal Air Force as a pilot in September 1939. He served with 264, 600 and 85 Squadrons, flying Defiants, Hurricanes and Beaufighters.

=== Drum and Golden City Post ===
In 1951, he provided financial backing to Bob Crisp to start a magazine called African Drum based in Cape Town, South Africa, and aimed at a Black readership, but as readership dropped, Bailey took full control. The monthly magazine was renamed to simply Drum and the head office moved to Johannesburg. Anthony Sampson was appointed editor. Bailey also founded in 1955 the Golden City Post, the country's first black Sunday tabloid.

=== The God-Kings and Titans ===
Bailey's 1973 book The God-Kings and the Titans: The New World Ascendancy in Ancient Times was a controversial work on pre-Columbian trans-oceanic contact, which claimed that thousands of years before Columbus Mediterranean sea voyagers among other peoples from the Old World landed on both the Atlantic and Pacific shores of America. The book has been referenced by many pseudohistoric writers.

=== Death ===
Bailey died in 2000, aged 80, from colon cancer. He was survived by his second wife, Barbara (née Epstein, whom he married in 1962), and by four children. One is the artist Beezy Bailey.

== Writing ==
- As In Flight (1961)
- National Ambitions (1958)
- Eskimo Nel (1964)
- The God-Kings and Titans (1973)
- The Sky Suspended (1990)
- The Poetry of a Fighter Pilot (1993)
- Sailing to Paradise (1993)
- Kenya, the great epic (1980)
