= Derrick Bailey =

Personal information
- Full name: Derrick Thomas Louis Bailey
- Born: 15 August 1918; Marylebone, London, England
- Died: 19 June 2009 (aged 90); Alderney, Channel Islands
- Batting: Right-handed
- Bowling: Right-arm medium
- Role: Batsman
- Relatives: Abe Bailey (father); Mary Bailey (mother)

Domestic team information
- Years: Team
- 1949–1952: Gloucestershire
- FC debut: 4 June 1949 Gloucestershire v Somerset
- Last FC: 2 September 1952 Gloucestershire v Northamptonshire

Career statistics
Competition	First-class
Matches	60
Runs scored	2,029
Batting average	24.44
100s/50s	2/8
Top score	111
Balls bowled	858
Wickets	12
Bowling average	32.33
5 wickets in innings	0
10 wickets in match	0
Best bowling	2/19
Catches/stumpings	36/–
- Source: CricketArchive, 27 June 2009

Sir Derrick Thomas Louis Bailey, 3rd Baronet DFC (15 August 1918 – 19 June 2009) was the son of the South African entrepreneur Sir Abe Bailey and of the pioneer aviator Dame Mary Bailey, and won fame for himself as a decorated Second World War pilot, a cricketer and a businessman. He set up the airline Aurigny Air Services in Jersey.

On inheriting his father's baronetcy in 1946 from his elder half-brother, he was known for the last 63 years of his life as Sir Derrick Bailey.

== Early life ==
Born at Marylebone in London, Derrick Bailey was Sir Abe Bailey's second son, and the first son of Abe Bailey's second marriage. He had a twin sister, Ann. Derrick Bailey was educated at Winchester College, where he was in the cricket eleven as a right-handed batsman in 1936. He also attended Christ Church, Oxford and played Minor Counties cricket for Oxfordshire in 1937, achieving some success as a medium-pace right-arm bowler, with 12 wickets, but less as a batsman, with a highest score of just 33 in nine innings. He played in the Oxford University Freshmen's trial match in 1937, scoring 53 in the second innings before retiring; though this was the joint highest score in the match, he was never picked for a full Oxford University team.

Bailey served with the South African Irish Regiment and then with the South African Air Force during the Second World War. He was awarded the Distinguished Flying Cross on 25 August 1944 for "gallantry and devotion to duty in the execution of air operations" flying with No. 223 Squadron RAF (later renumbered No. 30 Squadron, South African Air Force).

== First-class cricket ==
From 1948, Bailey, now resident as a farmer near Hereford, began playing cricket fairly regularly as a middle order batsman and medium-pace bowler for Gloucestershire's second eleven in the Minor Counties championship. In 1949, he made his first-class cricket debut in a heavy defeat for Gloucestershire away to Somerset at Taunton, batting at No 7, scoring 0 and 5, and not bowling. He then retained his place for the next five first team matches, though his record of 70 runs at a batting average of 8.75 runs per innings and a tally of just two wickets indicates little success. He was, however, awarded his county cap. He played – more as a batsman than as a bowler – for the second eleven later the same season, and continued in that fashion for the second team across 1950, until the match with Surrey's second eleven at the end of July 1950 when, with Gloucestershire facing a heavy defeat by that season's Minor Counties champions, Bailey opened the innings and scored an unbeaten 129 to save the match.

That innings led to a recall to the first team and though Bailey again took time to make a mark, in his third match, the game against Worcestershire at Cheltenham, he saved Gloucestershire from defeat by making 54 in 70 minutes at a time when Worcestershire's fast bowlers were getting lift from the pitch.

At the end of the 1950 season, Basil Allen, who had captained Gloucestershire in 1937–38 and from 1947 to 1950, retired, and Sir Derrick Bailey was appointed as his successor for the 1951 season, having been one of only a handful of amateur cricketers who had played for the county in the previous two years.

Gloucestershire under Bailey in 1951 dropped from seventh in the County Championship to twelfth, but Wisden claimed that "statistics told only half the story". Injuries to bowlers and the retirement of Tom Goddard, mainstay of the bowling attack for the previous 20 years, disrupted the team. Bailey's own performance earned praise from Wisden. His "advance" as a batsman was "satisfying" and "besides leading the side unobtrusively (he) set a great example by his courage and.. recorded his maiden century in first-class cricket". Injuries to batsmen meant that Bailey moved up and down the batting order: mostly he batted at No 6, but when opening batsmen were out of action, he opened the innings. His maiden century came in the second innings of a heavy defeat against Sussex at Hove; trailing by 273 after the first innings, Bailey promoted himself to No 3 for the second innings and made 111 "displaying special skill in strokes in front of the wicket".

The 111 in the innings against Sussex remained Bailey's highest score, but two weeks later, he made a second century, again batting at No 3, with 101 against Northamptonshire at Rushden when, said Wisden, he was the only Gloucestershire batsman to look "completely confident" against the off-spin of Sydney Starkie. Gloucestershire again lost the match. In the season as a whole, Bailey scored 1003 runs at an average of 30.39 runs per innings; he bowled only 31 overs all season and took just four wickets.

Bailey's second and final season as Gloucestershire captain was 1952. The team improved marginally to ninth in the County Championship and Wisden cited a "lack of batting solidity" as a reason why further success was not achieved. It added: "A point to be remembered was that Gloucestershire almost invariably tried to play attractively. Sometimes they were beaten when risking all to win. To strike the balance between enterprise and match-winning cricket is not always easy." Bailey himself was exonerated from criticism on lack of solidity: "Bailey's defensive stubbornness was worth more than its numerical value." His own batting record was down on his 1951 figures: in the season as a whole he scored 864 runs at an average of 23.35 runs per innings and with a highest score of 82, made as an opening batsman in the match against Essex at Southend-on-Sea.

At the end of the 1952 season, Bailey stood down from the captaincy and he did not appear again in first-class cricket. With no amateur available, Gloucestershire broke with tradition and appointed the senior professional player, Jack Crapp, as captain for the next two seasons.

== After cricket ==
Derrick Bailey
- Crest: A demi-female figure with arms extended Proper habited Azure trimmed at the collar cuffs and shoulders Argent holding in each hand a sprig of mimosa as in the arms.
- Shield: Argent on a fess between three martlets Gules a bezant between two sprigs of mimosa Proper.
- Motto: Virtus Castellum Meum

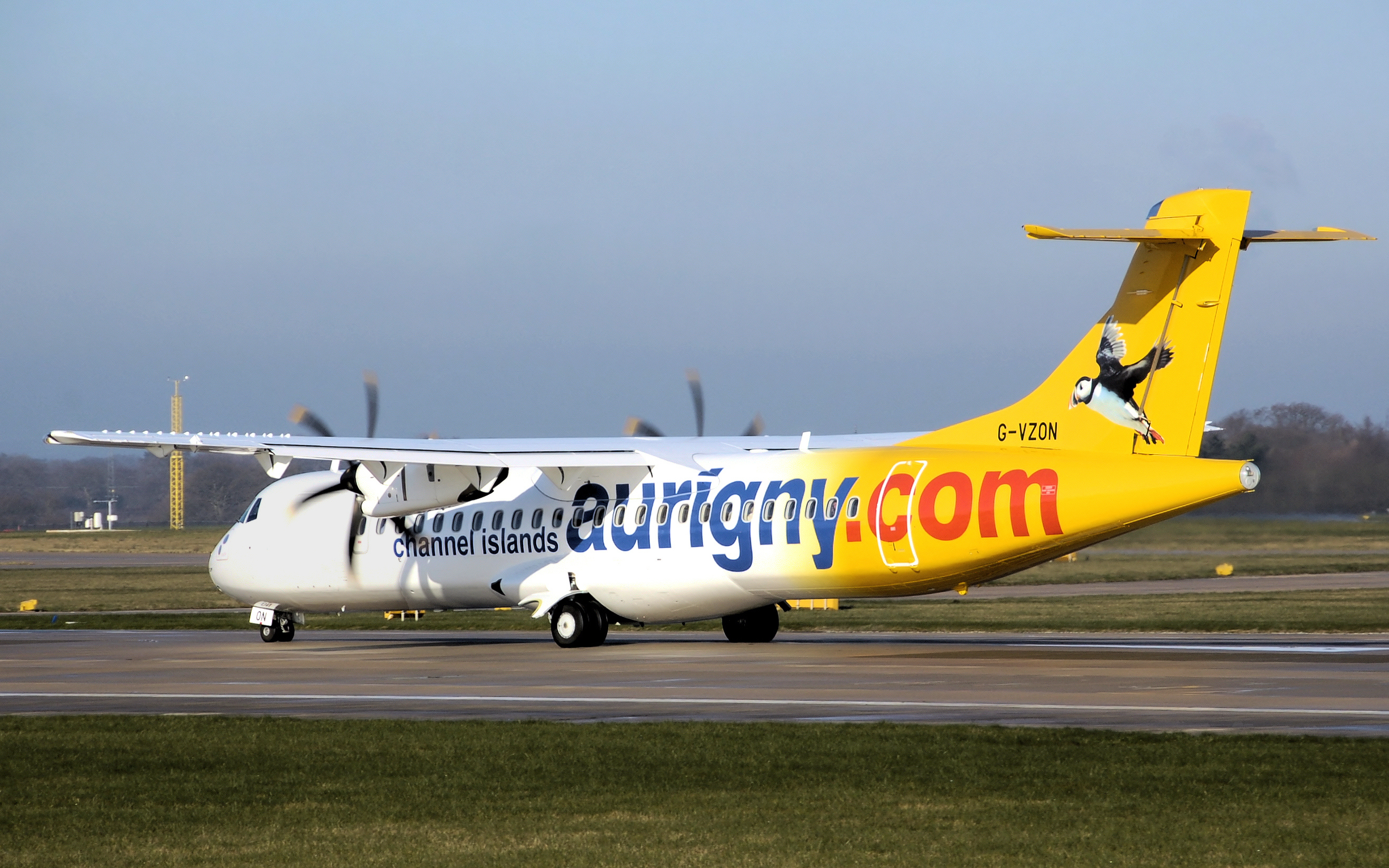
Aircraft in Aurigny's colours, based on Derrick Bailey's father's racing silks

In later life, Bailey lived on Alderney in the Channel Islands. His interests there included the local airline, Aurigny Air Services, which he set up in 1968 when British United Airways pulled out of the Alderney to Guernsey route, the island's regular link with its neighbour. According to the obituary on the BBC Channel Islands website, the Aurigny airline's colours, with a yellow tail section on its planes, were chosen by Bailey in memory of his father's horse racing colours. He is succeeded to the baronetcy by his oldest son Sir John Bailey, born Edinburgh.

Bailey died at his home on Alderney on 19 June 2009.

Baronetage of the United Kingdom
Preceded by John Bailey	Baronet (of Cradock); 1946–2009	Succeeded by John Bailey
