= Ernest Arnold Cowans =

British Army officer (1865–1942)

Brigadier-General Ernest Arnold Cowans
- Born: 5 December 1865
- Died: October 1942 (aged 76)
- Relatives: General Sir John Cowans (brother)
- Military career
- Allegiance: United Kingdom
- Branch: British Army
- Service years: 1885–1916
- Rank: Brigadier-General
- Units: King's Shropshire Light Infantry; Seaforth Highlanders
- Commands: 159th (Cheshire) Infantry Brigade
- Conflicts: Hazara Expedition of 1888; Second Boer War; First World War

Brigadier-General Ernest Arnold Cowans (5 December 1865 – October 1942) was a British Army officer who served in the First World War in command of an infantry brigade, where he was wounded in the Gallipoli campaign.

== Military career ==
Ernest Arnold Cowans was born in December 1865. After having served in the 4th (Militia) Battalion of the King's (Shropshire Light Infantry) (later the King's Shropshire Light Infantry), into which he had been commissioned as a lieutenant in February 1885, he transferred to the Regular Army and was commissioned into the Seaforth Highlanders in November 1886. He served in the Hazara Expeditions of 1888 and 1891 before going on to fight with the 2nd Battalion in the Second Boer War, where he was severely wounded at the Battle of Paardeberg in February 1900. He was invalided home on the SS Orotava in April 1900, but returned to South Africa and served with his battalion until February 1903, when they returned home on the SS Lake Manitoba.

He was promoted to major in June 1903.

By June 1914, shortly before the First World War began, Cowans, a colonel since June 1913, was commanding the Cheshire Brigade, a formation of the Territorial Force (TF), taking over from Colonel Henry Napier. He was promoted to the temporary rank of brigadier general in August, after the British entry into the First World War. He commanded the brigade for the rest of the year and into 1915, where in May it became the 159th (Cheshire) Brigade, with its parent formation, originally the Welsh Division, becoming the 53rd (Welsh) Division at the same time. Together with the rest of the 53rd Division, Cowans's brigade took part in the Gallipoli campaign in 1915. That August he was wounded in action while leading his brigade in battle:

Suvla Bay to Sulajic. 14 August 1915. Sniping continued day and night causing a steady drain in casualties, amongst the numbers was Brigadier-General Cowans, Commanding 159th Infantry Brigade.

His injury must have been severe as he received retired pay from May 1916 onwards. How he spent the remainder of his life is unknown. He died in October 1942, at the age of 76.

== Bibliography ==
- Davies, Frank; Maddocks, Graham (2014) [1995]. Bloody Red Tabs: General Officer Casualties of the Great War 1914–1918. Pen and Sword Books. ISBN 978-1-78346-237-7.
