= John Cowans =

British Army general (1862–1921)

General Sir John Cowans GCB GCMG MVO
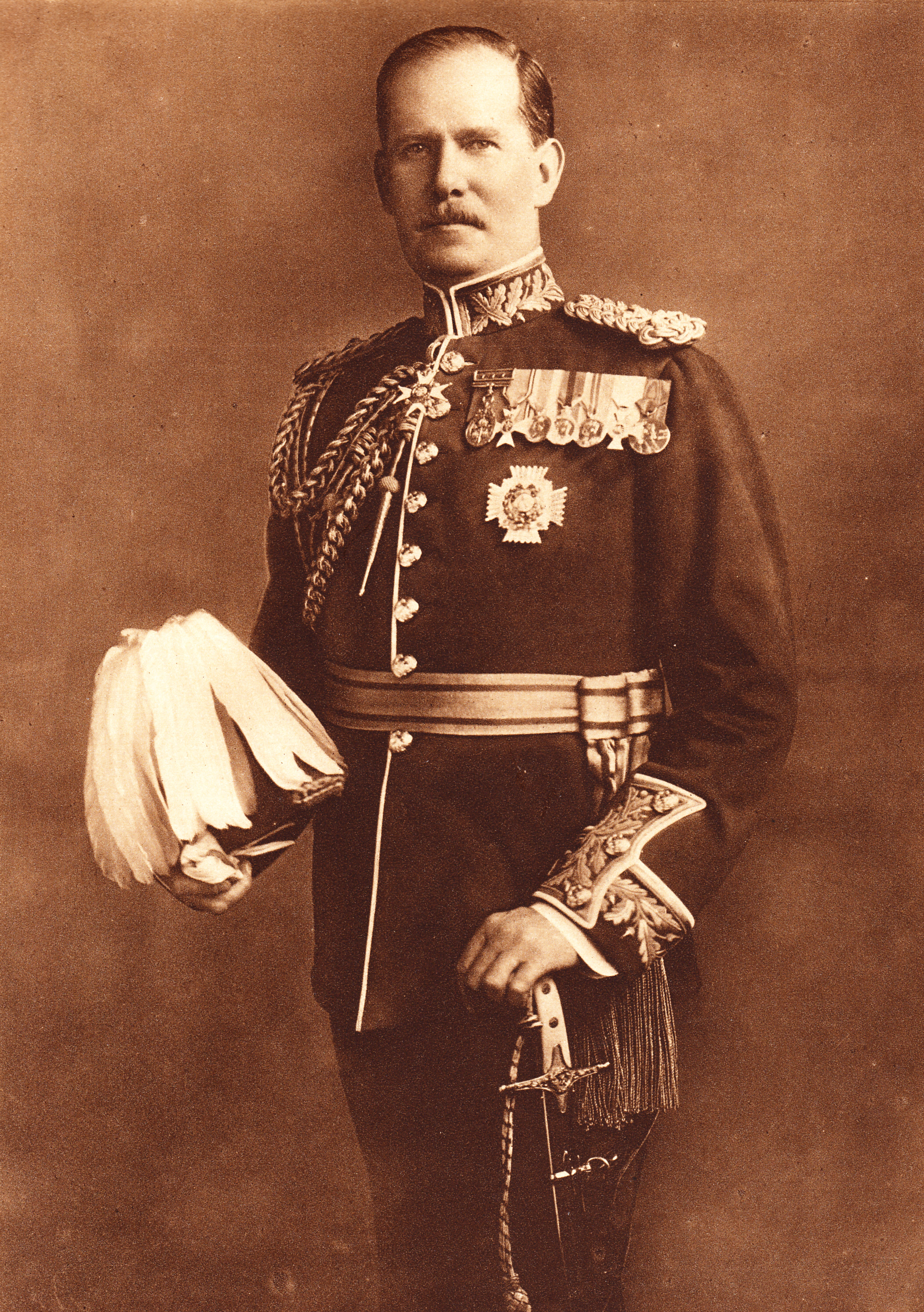
- Cowans, c. 1915
- Born: 11 March 1862; St Cuthbert Without, Carlisle, England
- Died: 16 April 1921 (aged 59); Menton, France
- Burial place: St Mary's Catholic Cemetery, Kensal Green, London, England
- Relatives: Brigadier General Ernest Arnold Cowans (brother)
- Military career
- Allegiance: United Kingdom
- Branch: British Army
- Service years: 1881–1919
- Rank: General
- Nickname: Jack
- Unit: Rifle Brigade (The Prince Consort's Own)
- Commands: Presidency Brigade
- Conflicts: Second Boer War; First World War
- Awards: Knight Grand Cross of the Order of the Bath; Knight Grand Cross of the Order of St Michael and St George; Member of the Royal Victorian Order; Grand Cross of the Order of the Redeemer (Greece)

General Sir John Steven Cowans, GCB, GCMG, MVO (11 March 1862 – 16 April 1921) was a senior British Army officer who served as Quartermaster-General to the Forces from 1912 to 1919, covering the period of the First World War.

Educated at Burney's Academy at Gosport and the Royal Military College, Sandhurst, Cowans was commissioned into the Rifle Brigade in 1881. He graduated from the Staff College, Camberley, in 1892 and became a Deputy Assistant Quartermaster General at Army Headquarters in 1898. In this role he organised the deployment of troops to the Second Boer War. He became Assistant Quartermaster-General of 2nd Division at Aldershot Command in 1903, and went on to become Director of Staff Duties and Training at Army Headquarters in India in 1907. He commanded the Presidency Brigade in Calcutta from 1908 to 1910, when he returned to the United Kingdom as Director-General of the Territorial Force.

Cowans became Quartermaster-General to the Forces in 1912, and in this capacity he was responsible for finding accommodation and supplies for more than a million newly enlisted servicemen at the start of the First World War. He was the only member of the Army Council to retain his position throughout the entire war.

== Early life ==
John Steven Cowans was born in Woodbank, St Cuthbert Without, Carlisle, on 11 March 1862, the oldest of three sons (one of whom, Ernest Arnold, later became a brigadier general) of John Cowans, an engineer who co-founded the Carlisle firm of Cowans, Sheldon & Co., and his wife Jeannie (née Steven). Cowans was always known as "Jack".

Cowans was educated at Burney's Academy at Gosport, a preparatory school for the Royal Navy. It was intended that he should enter the Navy, but, at the age of thirteen, he failed the entrance exam. He was sent on a tour of France, Germany, Italy and Switzerland with a tutor, before returning to Burney's Academy to prepare for the Royal Military College, Sandhurst, which he entered in 1878.

== Subaltern ==
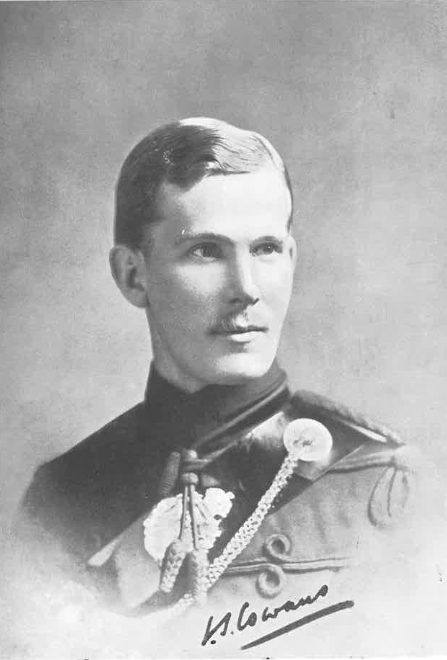
John Cowans as a subaltern, c. 1890

After passing out near the top of his class, Cowans was commissioned as a second lieutenant in the Rifle Brigade (The Prince Consort's Own) on 22 January 1881, having secured a nomination from its colonel-in-chief, Prince Arthur, Duke of Connaught and Strathearn. He embarked for India on HMS Jumna in March 1881 to join the 1st Battalion of the Rifle Brigade, which was based at Poona and Ahmednagar. Soon after arriving in Poona he became temporary aide-de-camp to Major-General John Ross until a permanent replacement arrived in January 1882, and he rejoined C Company of his battalion. He passed examinations in the Hindustani language and played cricket. He was promoted to lieutenant on 1 July 1881.

In late 1883, Cowans returned to the United Kingdom on sick leave and was assigned to the Regimental depot. He married Eva Mary Coulson, the eldest daughter of Reverend John Edmund Coulson, the Vicar of Long Preston in Yorkshire, on 14 February 1884. The wedding ceremony was held in the parish church in Grange-over-Sands, Lancashire, and was presided over by Reverend Henry White, the chaplain of the Queen's Chapel of the Savoy and Chaplain-in-Ordinary to Queen Victoria. They had no children.

Cowans was posted to the 2nd Battalion, Rifle Brigade, at Woolwich, then part of Kent, in May 1887. He was the only married subaltern in the battalion. His fellow junior officers included George Bingham, Ronald Haig, Reginald Byng Stephens, George Thesiger, Walter Congreve and Henry Wilson, all of whom later became generals, with Wilson becoming a field marshal.

== Staff officer ==
Cowans decided to further his career by entering the Staff College, Camberley. This was seen as a means of speedy advancement, and competition for places was keen. Cowans managed to narrowly pass the entrance examination, and entered on 1 February 1890. His class of thirty was a distinguished one; half of them later attained the rank of brigadier general or higher. While he was there he was promoted to captain on 3 September.

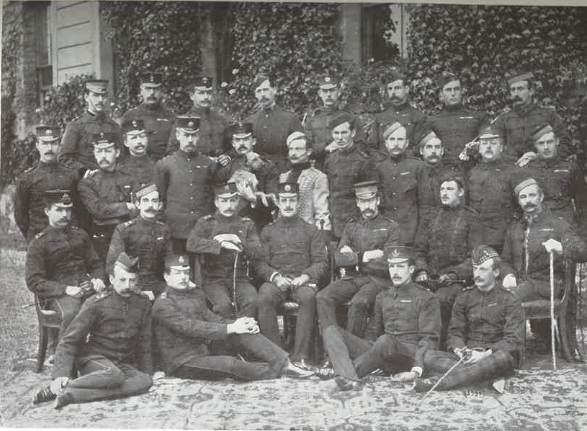
Staff College, Camberley, class in 1890. Cowans is seventh from the left in the middle row.

Upon graduation in January 1892, Cowans was attached to the War Office under the Assistant-Adjutant-General, Major-General Sir Coleridge Grove. His section (AG.7) worked on the mobilisation scheme, the first version of which had been issued shortly before Cowans arrived. He was officially seconded to the staff on 13 June 1893. On 1 September 1894, he became the brigade major of the 2nd Infantry Brigade at Aldershot, which was considered a plum job for a young staff officer who, despite the title, was still a captain.

His appointment as brigade major ended on 1 September 1897, and Cowans departed for India to join the 3rd Battalion of the Rifle Brigade, which then engaged in the Tochi Expedition. He reached the regimental depot at Rawal Pindi on 28 October, but active service continued to elude him; the 3rd Battalion was on its way back to its station at Umballa, having taken heavy losses, mainly from sickness. He was offered a position on the staff of the British Indian Army at Simla, but, on the advice of Coleridge Grove, he declined the appointment. Soon after, he was promoted to major on 9 March 1898, and reassigned to one of the battalions in the United Kingdom.

Cowans did not return to his regiment. On 11 May 1898, he was appointed a Deputy Assistant Quartermaster General in succession to Major Henry Merrick Lawson at the War Office, working in the movements section (QMG.2). He was involved with arrangements for the deployment of troops to the Sudan for the Nile Expedition of 1898, and for the autumn military manoeuvres in September 1898, the largest military manoeuvres since 1872, with 50,000 troops involved. Cowans had to make the required arrangements for rail and maritime transport.

On 11 October 1899, the Second Boer War began when the Boers invaded Natal. Cowans's section had considered this prospect in a series of conferences in April, May and June. It was calculated that £97,000 would be required to outfit ships to transport a corps and a cavalry brigade, but no provision had been made for this, and the Secretary of State for War, the Marquess of Lansdowne, declined to request a supplementary vote. On 23 September, Parliament provided £25,000. Once hostilities commenced, the Admiralty would provide a ship and fit it out, and inform Cowans when it would be ready to sail. Cowans would then allocate troops to the ship and arrange for them to be moved to the port by rail for embarkation. Between 1 August 1899 and 31 May 1902, he arranged for the embarkation of 98,826 regular and 36,568 auxiliary troops, and more than 90,000 reinforcements. Rail movements involved up to 25 special trains per day.

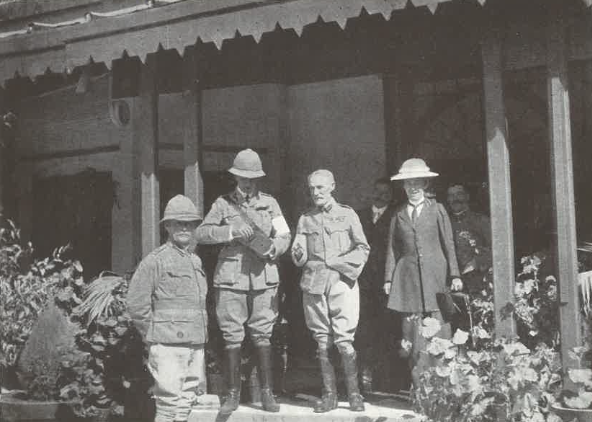
Archibald Hunter, John Cowans, Horace Smith-Dorrien and Mrs Adam outside Smith-Dorrien's bungalow in Quetta, India, c. 1907

Some division commanders requested Cowans's services as a staff officer, but the Quartermaster-General to the Forces, Lieutenant-General Sir Charles Mansfield Clarke, declined to release him. He did, however, promise Cowans that no officer of the Rifle Brigade would be promoted over his head. Thus, Cowans was promoted to the brevet rank of lieutenant colonel on 28 March 1900, ahead of officers on active service. He was involved in arrangements for the Coronation of King Edward VII and Queen Alexandra. For this service he was invested as a Member (fourth class) of the Royal Victorian Order (MVO) on 11 August 1902. The following year, he was promoted to the substantive rank colonel on 16 April and became Assistant Quartermaster-General of the 2nd Division at Aldershot Command.

In February 1906, Cowans was appointed Director-General of Military Education of the British Indian Army, and was replaced in his former position with the 2nd Division by Colonel Alexander Godley, later a full general. He assumed the post on 22 March, but when the General Staff of India was created he became Director of Staff Duties and Training at Army Headquarters in India on 1 April. In this role he was involved with the new staff college in India at Deolali, which relocated to Quetta in April 1907, ensuring that the curriculum was brought into line with that of Camberley. He acted as Director of Military Operations for a time, and as Chief of the General Staff (India) when Lieutenant-General Sir Beauchamp Duff was in England.

== General officer ==
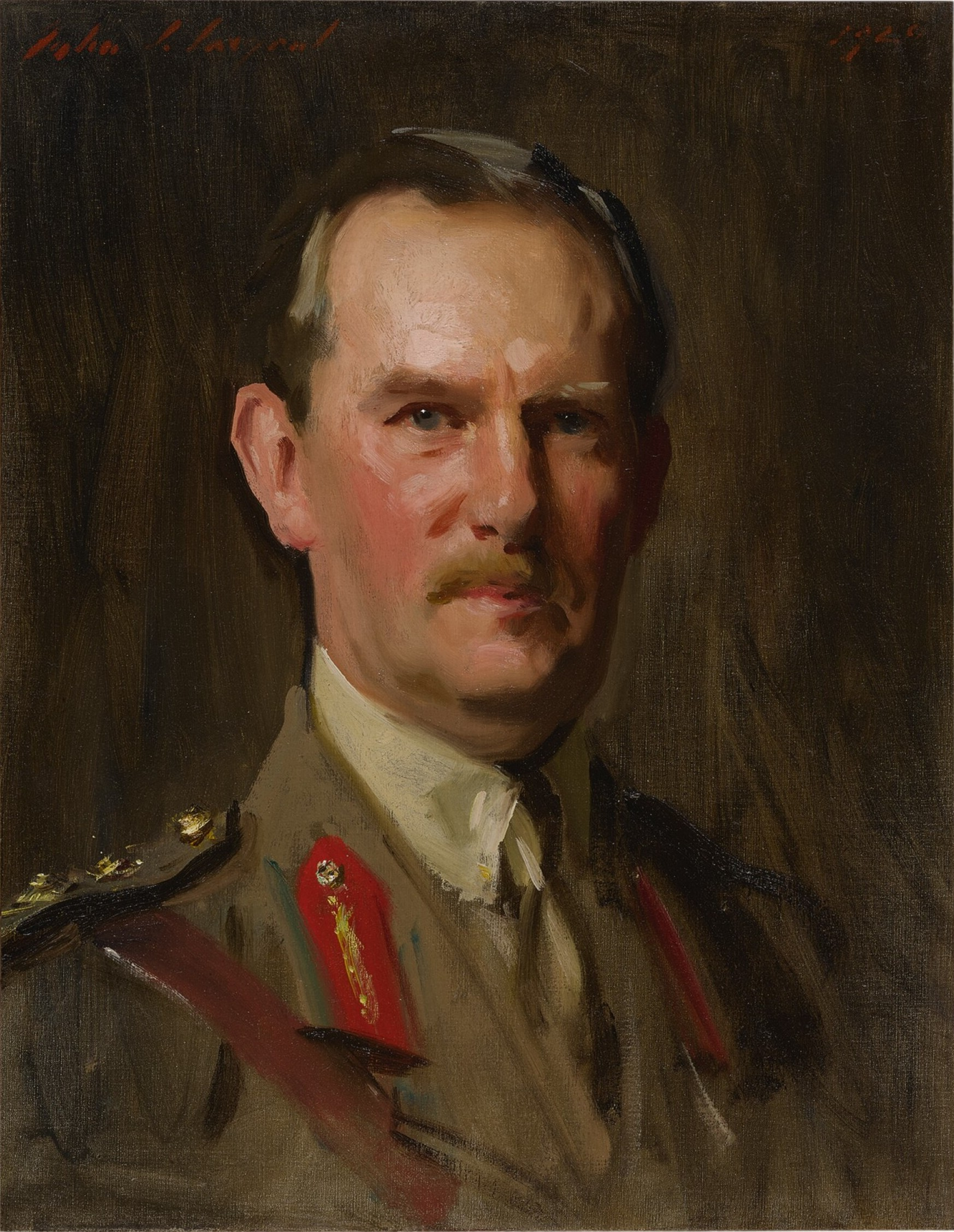
Portrait of Cowans by John Singer Sargent

Cowans became commander of the Presidency Brigade in Calcutta with the temporary rank of brigadier general on 5 December 1908. He was promoted to major general on 21 March 1910. A minor crisis erupted later that year when a Chinese expedition to Tibet caused the Dalai Lama to flee to Darjeeling, and it was feared that Chinese forces might pursue him. Cowans was about to depart on four months' leave, and he asked General Headquarters, India (GHQ) whether he should cancel. The reply he received was: "everybody knows you have never heard a shot fired in anger, except by an angry husband, so I don't think you need to forgo your leave."

While on leave in Évian-les-Bains in France, Cowans was summoned back to England by Secretary of State for War Richard Haldane, who offered him the recently created position of director general of the Territorial Force (TF), which had come into being as a result of the Haldane Reforms. Cowans returned to India briefly to settle private affairs and hand over command of the Presidency Brigade to Brigadier-General Hew Dalrymple Fanshawe, before he assumed his new post on 7 November 1910, taking over from Lieutenant General Sir Henry Mackinnon.

The TF was administered by county associations, military committees chaired by the lord lieutenants with local commanding officers as members, that handled the raising, recruiting, equipping and supplying of their units. When the units were called up for training, the county associations became responsible for the welfare of the wives and children of the troops as well. Cowans developed good personal relationships with the chairman of the county associations, for whom he was invariably approachable and sympathetic.

Most of their problems were financial, and Cowans had little additional money to give them, but he gave them the benefit of his time, energy, enthusiasm and administrative skills, and was able to secure some additional latitude in spending their funding. He noted that one of the duties of the county associations was to provide the riding horses and draught horses for the TF. Cowans drew up a scheme for the compulsory purchase of horses for both the TF and the Expeditionary Force in the event of war. It was estimated that on mobilisation, the Expeditionary Force would require 42,000 horses and the TF would need 86,000. Cowans was made a Companion of the Order of the Bath (CB) in the 1911 Coronation Honours on 19 June 1911 in the civil division, as his lack of active service precluded a military division award.

== Quartermaster General to the Forces ==
Cowans became the Quartermaster-General to the Forces and third military member of the Army Council on 3 June 1912. He was advanced to Knight Commander of the Order of the Bath in the 1913 Birthday Honours on 3 June 1913, and promoted to lieutenant-general on 28 October 1915.

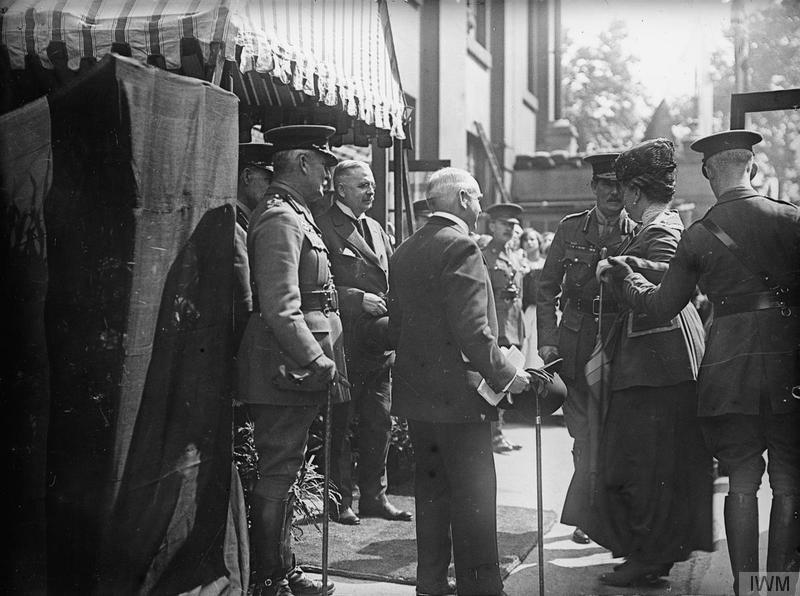
Cowans receives Queen Mary at the Royal Army Clothing Depot on 21 June 1918

In the days leading up to the declaration of war on 4 August 1914, Cowans urged the government to cancel the Territorial Army's annual camps, which for most of them was in the first week of August. This was not done, and trains needed for the expeditionary force had to collect Territorials and return them to their depots. Despite this, the first shipload of stores departed on 9 August, and by 23 August, five infantry and two cavalry divisions of the British Expeditionary Force (BEF) had reached their wartime stations in France.

The Army Council realised that the existing barracks could hold only 175,000 men, and this would be inadequate for Kitchener's Army. Plans had been drawn up before the war for standard 18.3-by-6.1-metre (60 by 20 ft) huts with a wooden frame and corrugated iron exterior that could accommodate thirty men; forty of these could house a battalion. The plans incorporated officers' and sergeants' messes, a recreation hut and a cookhouse with dining halls on either side. Major-General George Scott-Moncrieff recommended that priority be given to the facilities, with the men initially sleeping under canvas, but Cowans disagreed, and directed that every effort be made to complete both simultaneously. At the time, this seemed reasonable, but by October the requirements had grown from 100,000 to 850,000 men. Existing barracks became overcrowded. Shortages of labour and materials developed, and the expanded program could not be completed before winter set in. Although there was no shortage of tents, some of the new sites were poorly chosen and flooded or became quagmires under heavy rains in November. Some 800,000 troops had to be billeted in private homes.

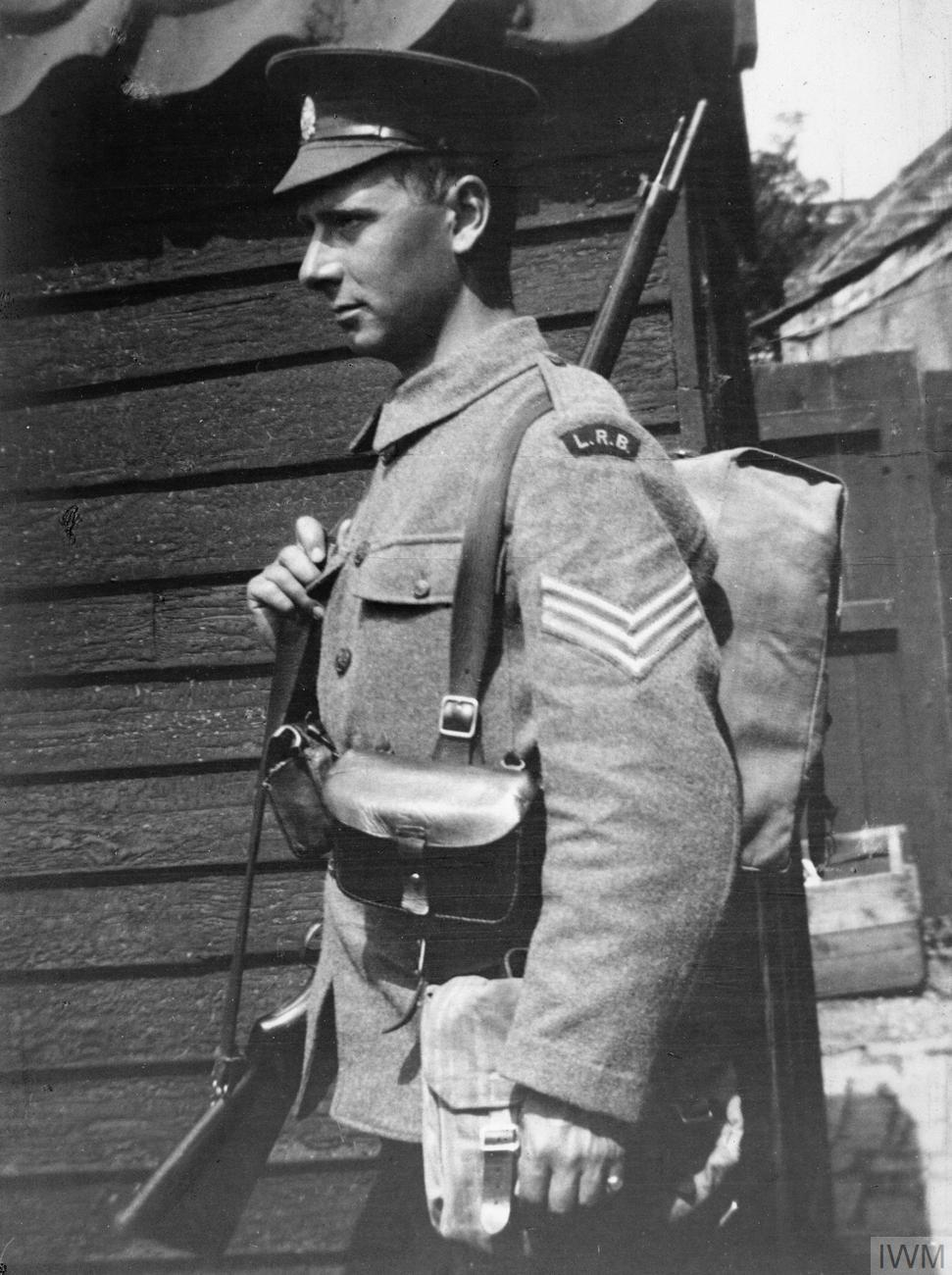
A sergeant of the London Regiment wearing the 1914 Pattern Leather Equipment

The large number of troops needed to be outfitted. In peacetime this had been done through contracts with a small number of firms, and production could not be rapidly expanded. As an interim measure, 500,000 blue serge suits were obtained from Post Office stocks, and some units were supplied with nineteenth-century scarlet tunics. Cowans reduced expenditure wherever possible by eliminating middlemen. He arranged for the whole of the British wool production to be purchased from the farmers, and the entirety of Australian wool production was made available by the Australian government.

Accoutrements presented a greater problem. The British Army had adopted 1908 Pattern Webbing equipment, which was superior to the old leather equipment as it did not sweat and corrode ammunition cartridges. However, only two firms in the UK had the specialised machinery to manufacture webbing, which was fine in peacetime when the annual requirement was 100,000 sets. In the interim, 1914 Pattern Leather Equipment was issued in which only backpacks and haversacks were made from webbing, with leather being substituted for other components.

While horses were still the mainstay of transport in the field, as the war went on, there was a tendency to substitute motor transport for horse transport. To economise on manpower, women were trained to drive and maintain motor vehicles. Cowans successfully resisted attempts to absorb his drivers into the Women's Army Auxiliary Corps. By July 1915, UK production of military vehicles reached 250 per week. Contracts were placed in the United States but in 1916 Cowans was directed to cancel American contracts to save foreign exchange. This was done, but later that same year the contracts had to be reopened to produce seventy lorries per week. The Holt Manufacturing Company continued to supply the caterpillar tractors needed to pull heavy artillery pieces, as these were not manufactured in the UK. By the later stages of the war the forces in France alone were consuming forty-eight megalitres (ten point five million imperial gallons) of petrol per month. Storage tanks were established at Rouen and Calais so that fuel could be received from oil tankers sailing directly from the United States.

Cowans worked well with the original Quartermaster-General of the BEF, Lieutenant-General Sir William Robertson, but Robertson became Chief of the General Staff of the BEF on 25 January 1915, and was replaced by Major-General Ronald Charles Maxwell. Cowans's relationship with Maxwell slowly deteriorated until, on 23 December 1917, Maxwell was replaced by Lieutenant-General Sir Travers Clarke.

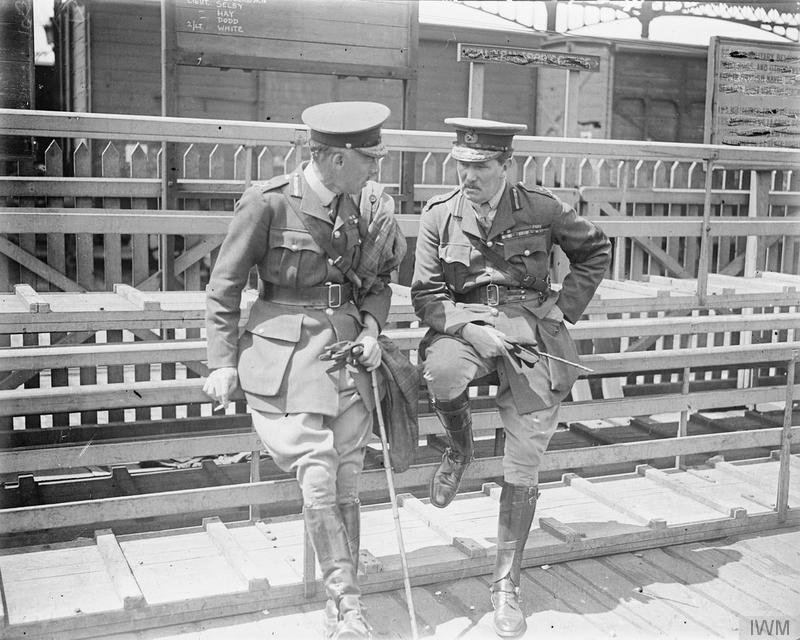
Cowans in conversation with General Sir Henry Rawlinson at Boulogne, France, on 15 June 1918

Cowans liked to work late, seldom retiring for the night before 0200, but waking around 0800. Working late at night enabled him to write without interruptions. When he could he left London for the weekend, staying with General Sir Arthur Paget at Kingston Hill or Lord Pembroke in Wilton, Wiltshire. He also liked to play golf at Cooden.

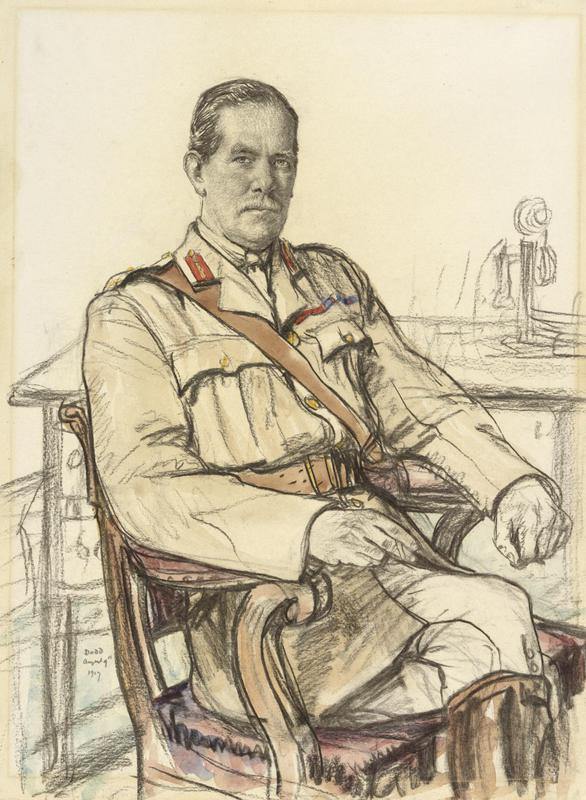
A three quarter length portrait of General Sir John Cowans in uniform, seated with his arms resting on the arms of a chair and a desk sketched behind.

In November 1916, Cowans became embroiled in a scandal. Patsy Cornwallis-West began a relationship with Patrick Barrett, a much younger sergeant in the Royal Welch Fusiliers, and wrote to Cowans urging that Barrett be commissioned. This was done but they subsequently had a falling out and she forwarded a letter he wrote to her to his commanding officer, Colonel Henry Delmé-Radcliffe, who decided to have Barrett transferred from the 12th Battalion to the 3rd Battalion of the Royal Welch Fusiliers. When she heard that Barrett's friends were seeking to take action, she again wrote to Cowans, who replied that orders had already gone out, adding, "I would fight for you if I had the time." The government convened a court of inquiry, which declared that "Cornwallis-West's conduct was highly discreditable." Delmé-Radcliffe was relieved of his command, and the government expressed its displeasure at Cowans, but given his excellent service as Quartermaster-General, took no action against him.

One reason for this was the course of the Mesopotamian campaign, where maladministration and the British defeat in the Siege of Kut led to responsibility for the campaign being transferred from the government of India to the War Office, making Cowans responsible for its logistics.

Cowans became Knight Grand Cross of the Order of St Michael and St George in the 1918 New Year Honours, and a Knight of Grace of the Order of the Hospital of St John of Jerusalem on 28 March 1918. He was promoted to general in the 1919 New Year Honours, and to Knight Grand Cross of the Order of the Bath on 20 March 1919. He was the only member of the Army Council to retain his position throughout the entire war.

== Death ==
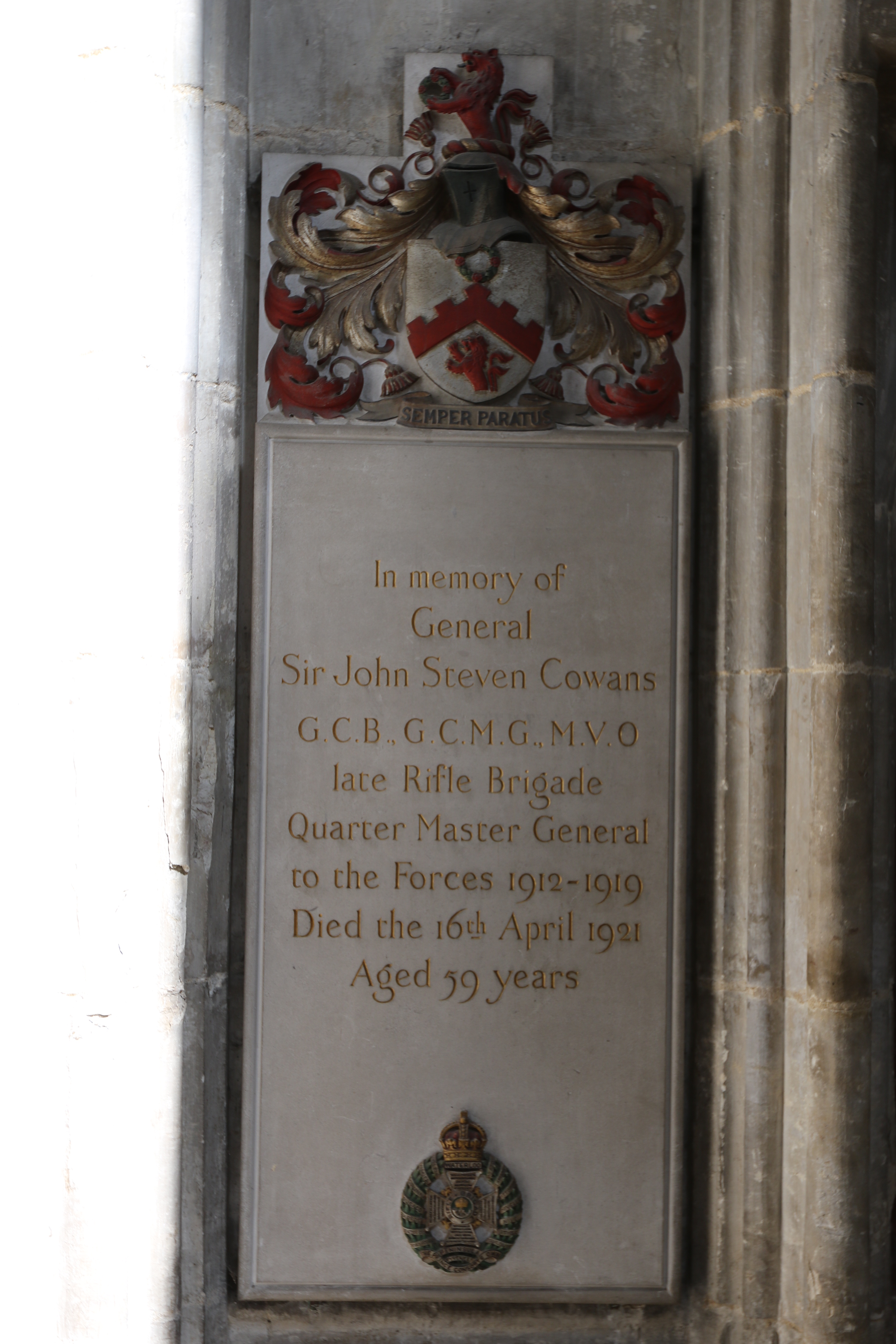
Memorial to John Steven Cowans in Winchester Cathedral

Cowans abruptly resigned on 15 March 1919 and joined the Shell Transport and Trading Company, and soon after set off on a business trip to survey oil production in the Middle East. On 18 September, he returned to Carlisle to be presented with the Freedom of the City. No longer a serving officer, he used the occasion to express his disappointment at the omission of the administrative services from the government's Thanks To The Forces. He declared: "This has been a war of administration rather than of strategy or tactics".

In November 1920, after consulting with John Thomson-Walker, Cowans underwent surgery for a kidney complaint. In early 1921, he went to stay with friends at Cap Ferrat in the south of France. His condition deteriorated, and he was moved to a nursing home in Menton. He decided to convert to Roman Catholicism, as his mother and brother had done, and was received into the church on 11 April. He died on 16 April. A requiem mass was held at the Basilica of St Michael the Archangel, Menton. His body lay in state at Westminster Abbey and he was buried at St Mary's Catholic Cemetery in Kensal Green, London on 25 April.

== Honours and awards ==
Cowans never served in combat, so he never earned any campaign medals or decorations for gallantry, but he was awarded the King Edward VII Coronation Medal, the King Edward VII Delhi Durbar Medal and the King George V Coronation Medal. He also received several foreign awards and decorations, including being made a Grand Officer of the Legion of Honour of France, of the Order of the Crown of Belgium, and of the Order of the Crown of Italy; a Grand Cordon of the Order of the Sacred Treasure of Japan; the second class of the Order of the Golden Grain of China; and the United States Distinguished Service Medal. In October 1919, he was appointed a Grand Cross of the Order of the Redeemer by Alexander of Greece, King of the Hellenes, the highest grade of the highest order of Greece.

Cowans died insolvent; his fortune of £8,000 was consumed by his debts. His widow put his medals up for sale. They were purchased anonymously by his friends, and Lady Cowans was permitted to retain them until her death, when they were deposited in the United Service Museum. The King offered her a Civil List pension of £100 per year, but she declined.

== Post-mortem scandal ==
In March 1925, Dorothy Muriel Dennistoun revealed that she had lived as Cowans's mistress with the consent of her husband, Lieutenant Colonel Ian Onslow Dennistoun. She alleged that she had used her influence with the general to secure important Army positions for her husband. The couple had divorced in May 1921, and had agreed to forgo a formal claim of alimony in return for his financial support. He had since married Almina Herbert, Countess of Carnarvon, the widow of George Herbert, 5th Earl of Carnarvon, and another close friend of Cowans. Dorothy sued to claim money that she said he owed her. The jury awarded Dorothy £5,000, but the judge, Henry Alfred McCardie, voided the verdict, and awarded her £472.

== Reputation ==
Historian Peter Simkins considered Cowans to be "the only truly outstanding officer on the Army Council", Prime Minister H. H. Asquith described him as "the best Quartermaster since Moses", and his successor, David Lloyd George regarded him as "the most capable soldier thrown up by the War in our Army". Nonetheless, historian Clem Maginniss concluded that "It is of course the lot of logisticians, regardless of rank and appointment, to be forgotten. Great War history is replete with well-known generals whose names spring quickly to mind, but Cowans is not one of them."

== Dates of rank ==
- Second lieutenant 22 January 1881
- Lieutenant 1 July 1881
- Captain 3 September 1890
- Major 9 March 1898
- Lieutenant-Colonel (brevet) 28 March 1900
- Colonel 16 April 1903
- Brigadier-General (temporary) 5 December 1908
- Major-General 21 March 1910
- Lieutenant-General 28 October 1915
- General 1 January 1919

== Notes ==
Military offices
Preceded by Sir Herbert Miles	Quartermaster-General to the Forces; 1912–1919	Succeeded by Sir Travers Clarke
