= James Guthrie (artist) =

Scottish painter (1859–1930)

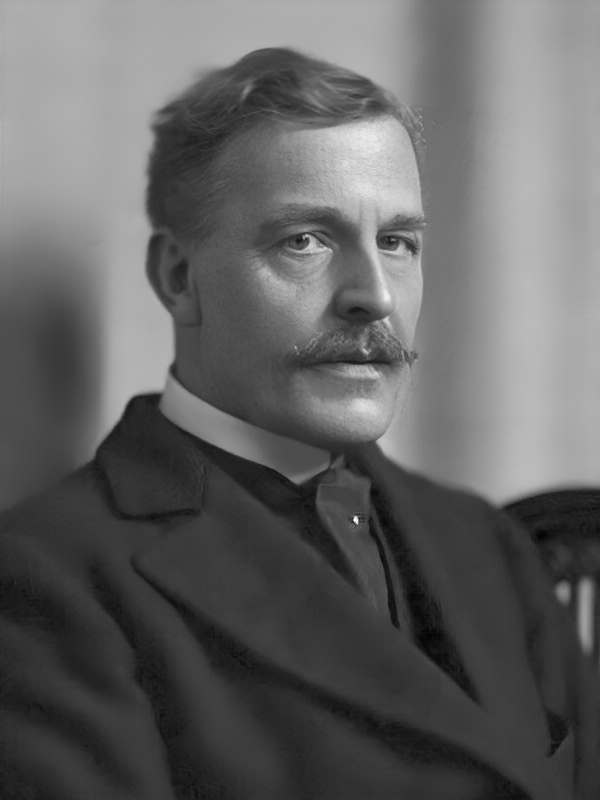
James Guthrie

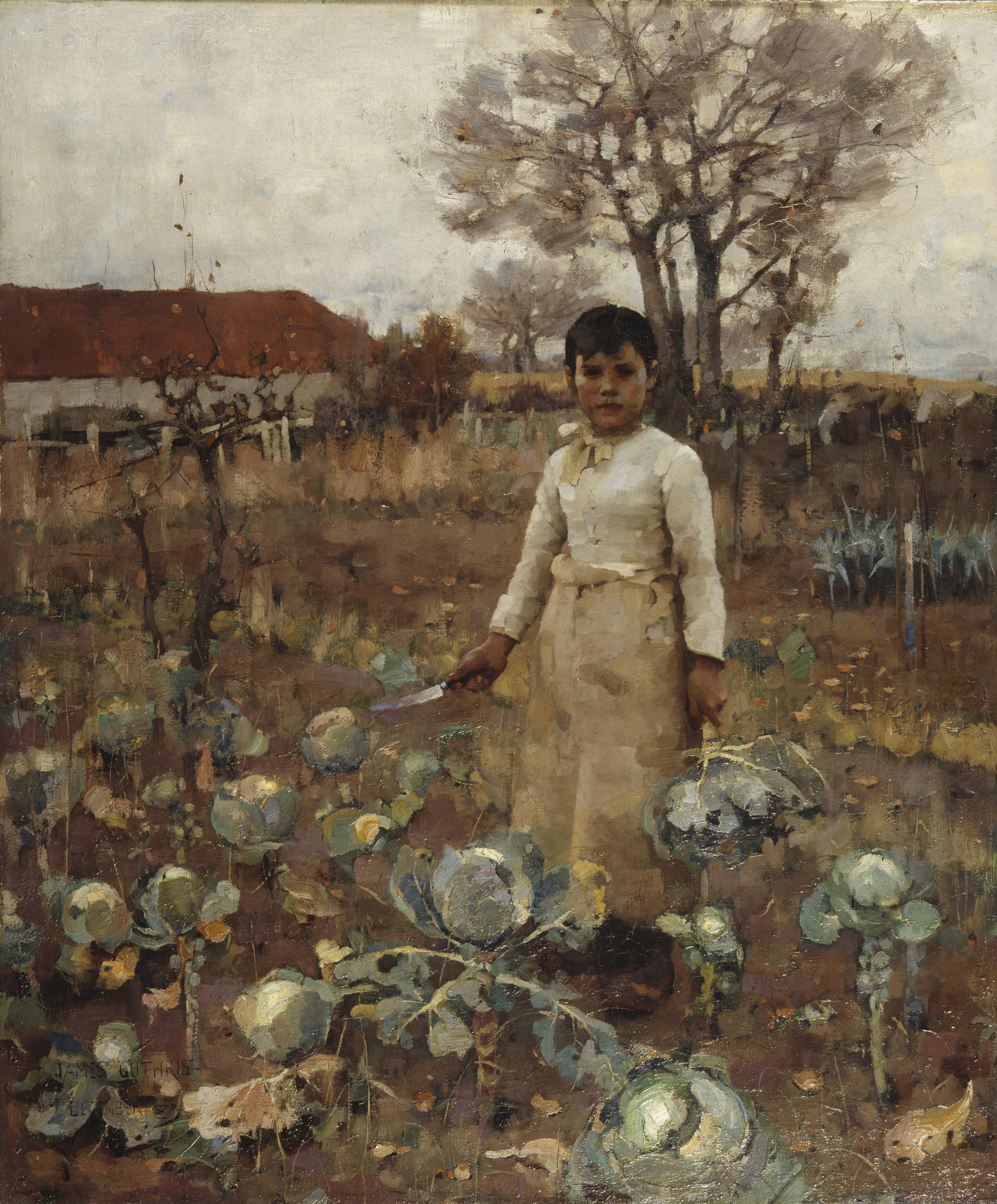
A Hind's Daughter by Sir James Guthrie 1883, Scottish National Gallery

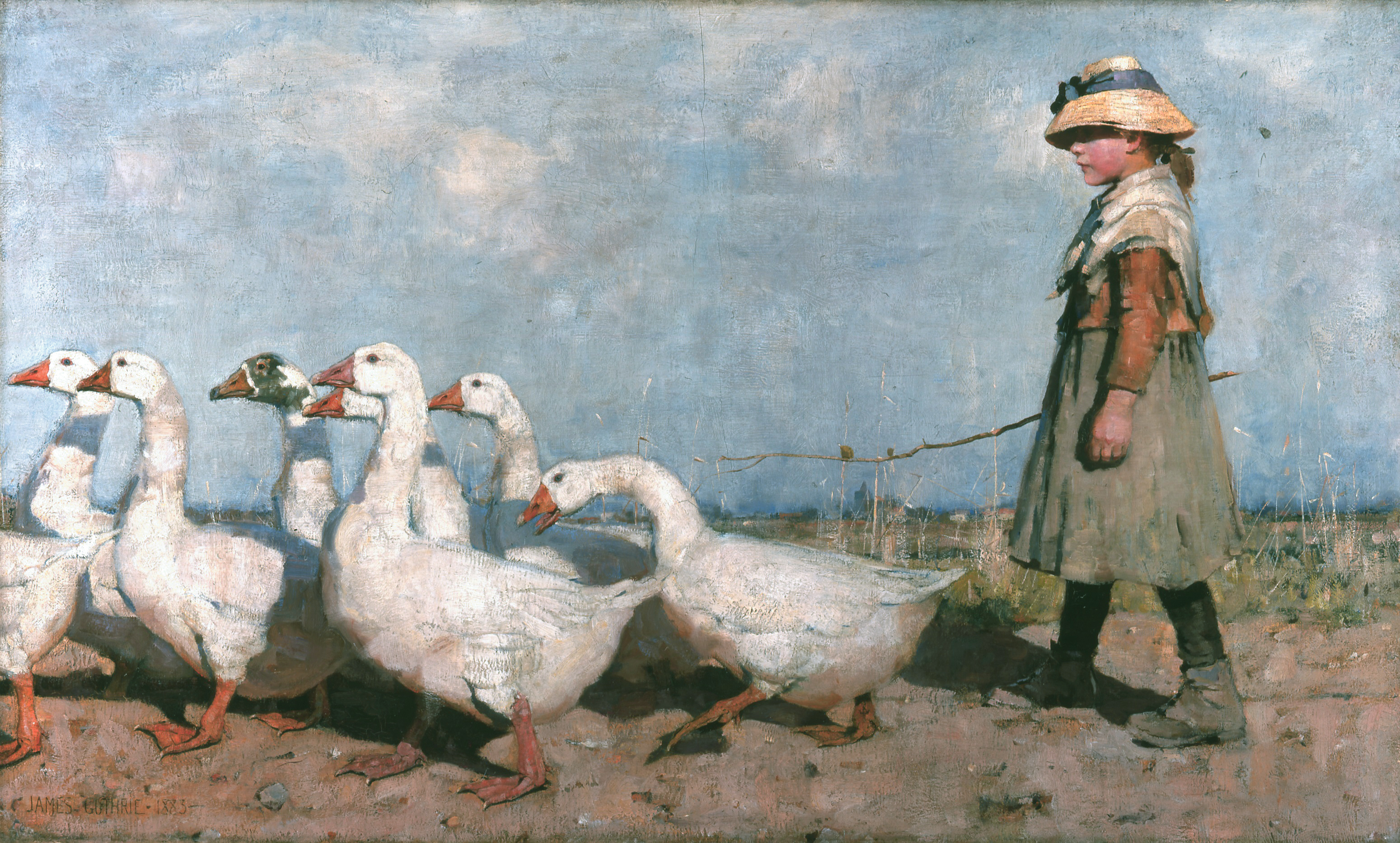
To Pastures New (1883), painted when Guthrie was only 23 years old. Art critic Brian Sewell wrote of the picture, "Of its kind it is a masterpiece...".

Sir James Guthrie PPRSA (10 June 1859 – 6 September 1930) was a Scottish painter, associated with the Glasgow Boys. He is best known in his own lifetime for his portraiture, although today more generally regarded as a painter of Scottish Realism.

== Early life and education ==
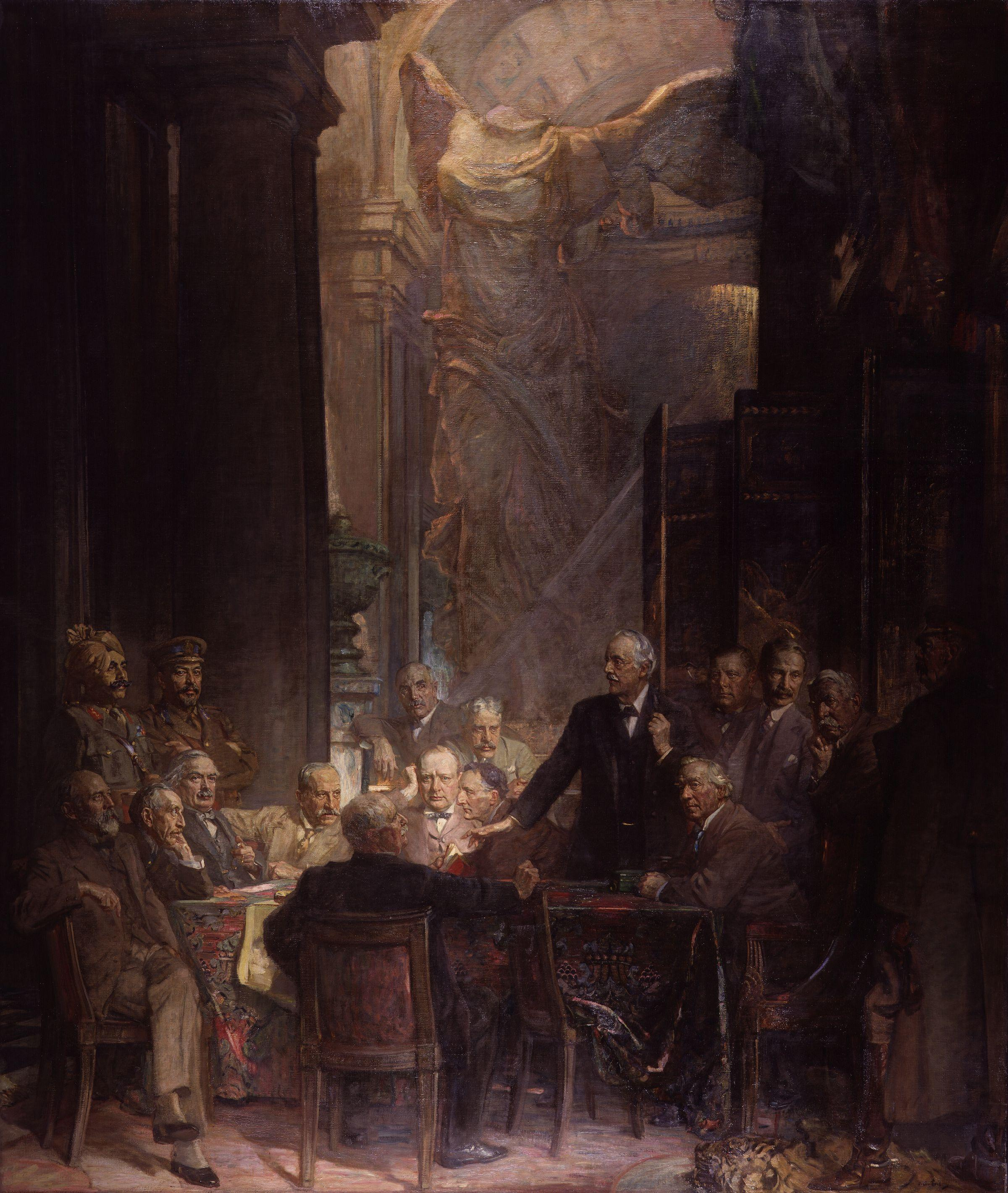
Statesmen of World War I, 1930, National Portrait Gallery, London

Guthrie was born in Greenock, the youngest son of the Rev. John Guthrie, a minister of the Evangelical Union church, and Anne Orr. He originally enrolled at Glasgow University to study law, but in 1877 abandoned this in favour of painting. Unlike many of his contemporaries he did not study in Paris, being mostly self-taught, although he was mentored for a short time by James Drummond in Glasgow and then John Pettie in London. In 1879, he moved to London to study painting. during the summer he painted at rural locations, often Rosneath and Helensburgh but mostly at Cockburnspath. Guthrie spent some time with his friend Edward Arthur Walton living in Cheyne Walk in Chelsea

== Career ==
Guthrie lived most of his life in the Scottish Borders, since 1883 in Cockburnspath, Berwickshire, where he painted some of his most important works, including A Hind's Daughter (1883), and Schoolmates (1884). He was strongly influenced by the French Realists, especially Jules Bastien-Lepage, and was associated with the Glasgow Boys.

In 1888, he was elected an associate of the Royal Scottish Academy, and a full member in 1892. In November 1902 he was unanimously elected to succeed Sir George Reid as RSA president, and he moved with his family from Glasgow to Edinburgh. In 1903, he was knighted. A member of Glasgow Art Club Guthrie exhibited often at the club's annual exhibitions.

In 1919, Guthrie was commissioned by South African financier Sir Abraham Bailey, 1st Baronet to paint a group portrait of 17 politicians and statesmen of Britain and its allies who held office during the First World War. The painting, Statesmen of World War I, was completed in 1930, shortly before Guthrie's death. The painting was donated to the National Portrait Gallery, London. Guthrie's 17 preparatory oil studies were donated to Scottish National Portrait Gallery.

In 1920, the King of Belgium conferred Guthrie with the Cross of Commander of the Order of the Crown.

In 1921, he joined the newly-formed Society of Graphic Art, and exhibited with them in 1921.

== Personal life and death ==
In the late 1880s Guthrie met Helen Newton Whitelaw, a wealthy widow at her family home, Rowmore, in Rhu, Dunbartonshire. They married in 1897 and in 1899 their son Thomas Whitelaw Boyd Guthrie was born in Chelsea, London. On October 20, 1912 she died of cancer at the age of 52.

Guthrie died in the house of his retiral in 1930. His grave in Rhu was designed by the architect Alexander Nisbet Paterson.

== Work ==
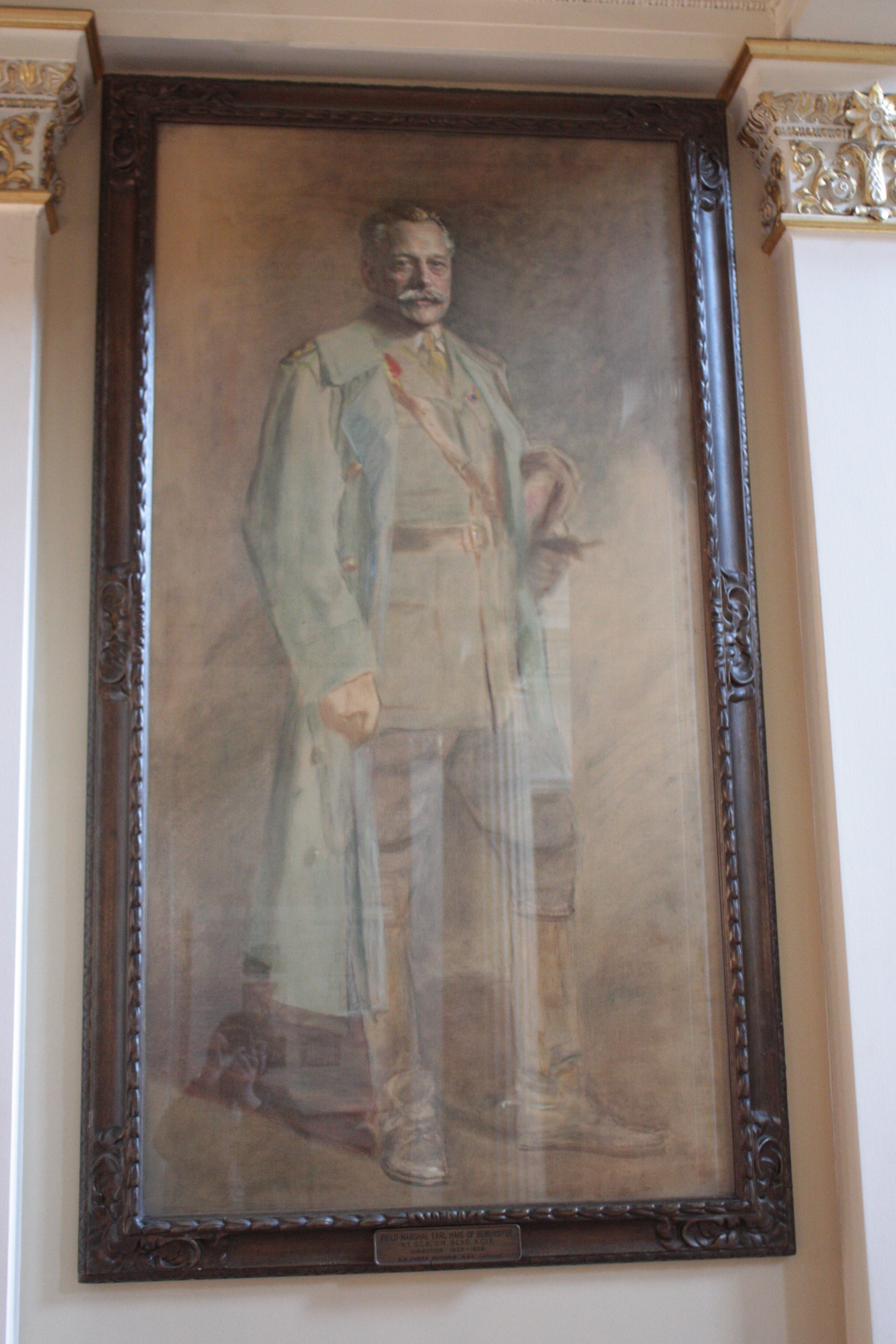
Earl Haig by James Guthrie 1923.

By 1885, Guthrie was a reputable portrait painter and in later life he virtually abandoned other subjects. He was commissioned by many of the rich and famous of his day to paint their portraits. The list includes:

- Herbert Henry Asquith (portrait and sketch study) Scottish National Portrait Gallery (archive)
- Arthur James Balfour (two portraits) Scottish National Portrait Gallery
- Sir Henry Campbell-Bannerman, Prime Minister of the United Kingdom 1905–08
- George Nicoll Barnes statesman, Scottish National Portrait Gallery (archive)
- Sir Charles Barrie (1840–1912) Lord Provost of Dundee 1902-5, Dundee Art Gallery
- Thomas Berwick (1753–1828) (based on an early portrait)
- Sir Robert Laird Borden prime minister of Canada, Scottish National Portrait Gallery archive
- Gen. Louis Botha Scottish National Portrait Gallery
- Sir John James Burnet
- James Caldwell, county clerk of Renfrewshire, Paisley Art Gallery
- James Coats, mill-owner of Coats Thread fame, Paisley Art Gallery
- Sir Joseph Cook prime minister of Australia
- Sir Winston Churchill
- Marcus Dods (theologian) (1834–1909) Edinburgh University Fine Art Collection
- Rev. Dr. Andrew Gardiner
- Sir Frederick C. Gardiner (1855–1937), Glasgow Galleries archive
- Sir Eric Campbell Geddes
- David Lloyd George, Scottish National Portrait Gallery (archive)
- Sir John Gilmour (1876–1940)
- Edward Grey (1862–1933) Britain's Foreign Secretary from 1905 to 1916
- Dr. Errol Guthrie (his nephew who was killed in World War One), Aberdeen Art Gallery
- Field Marshal Haig (hanging in Dundas House), commissioned for his directorship of the Commercial Bank in 1923.
- William Morris Hughes
- Prof. William Jack (1834–1924), Professor of Mathematics, Glasgow University, Hunterian Art Gallery, Glasgow.
- Bonar Law (two portraits) one in the Palace of Westminster, one in the Scottish National Portrait Gallery (archive)
- Lt Arthur Leslie Hamilton of the Highland Light Infantry d.1918, Glasgow Galleries archive
- William Ferguson Massey, Prime Minister of New Zealand
- Sir Alfred Milner Scottish National Portrait Gallery (archive)
- Edward Patrick Morris Prime Minister of Newfoundland
- Bailie Alexander Osborne
- Sir George Paul (1839–1926) Deputy Keeper of the Signet Library, Edinburgh
- Sir Robert William Philip
- Sir Ganga Singh Scottish National Portrait Gallery (archive)
- Sir John Shearer
- Sir William Turner
- Archibald Stodart Walker
- Rev. Alexander Whyte (1836–1921) Principal of New College, Edinburgh, Scottish National Portrait Gallery archive
- James Younger (1856–1946)
- George Lennox Watson
- Schoolmates (1884), MSK Ghent, Belgium
