= Mary Bailey (aviator) =

Anglo-Irish aviator (1890–1960)

Dame Mary Bailey DBE
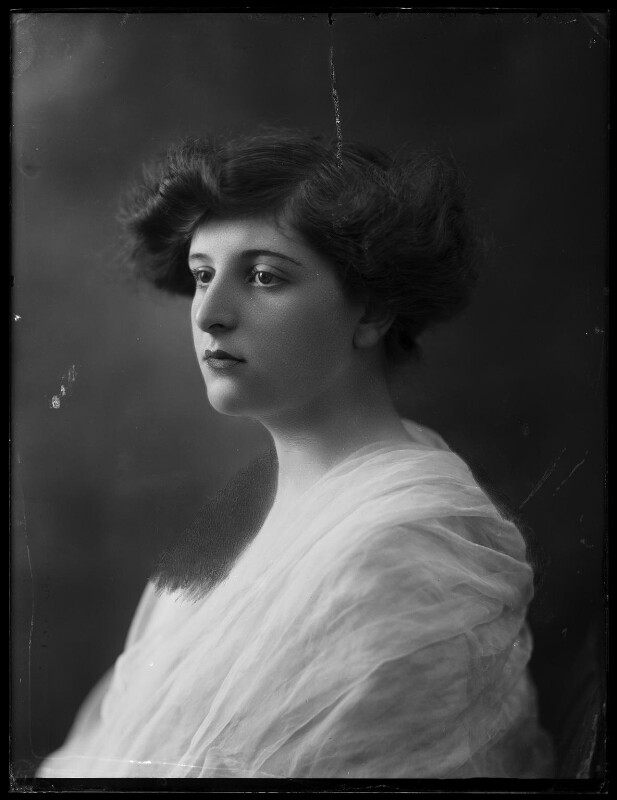
- Mary, Lady Bailey, 1911
- Born: The Hon Mary Westenra; 1 December 1890; Rossmore Castle, County Monaghan, Ireland
- Died: 29 August 1960 (aged 69); Kenilworth, Cape Town, South Africa
- Occupation: Aviator
- Spouse: Sir Abraham Bailey (m. 1911; died 1940)
- Children: 5, including Derrick and James

Dame Mary Bailey, Lady Bailey, DBE (née Westenra; 1 December 1890 – 29 July 1960) was an Anglo-Irish aviator. She was known as one of the finest aviatrixes of her time, who '"personally guided a plane from England to the nether tip of South Africa and back"

== Early life ==
The Hon Mary Westenra was the only daughter of Derrick Westenra, 5th Baron Rossmore, of Rossmore Castle, County Monaghan and his wife, Mittie (née Naylor). She had two brothers.

She spent most of her childhood in Ireland where she was taught by governesses after running away from school in 1906. Adventurous from a young age, she apparently bought a motorbike in her youth and was gaining a reputation for speeding in cars by 1914.

== Aviation ==
During the First World War, Mary volunteered as an aviation mechanic and served in Britain and France, with the Women's Auxiliary Air Corps which provided female mechanics to the Royal Flying Corps.

She was given flight instruction in 1926 by Mary, Lady Heath (at the time Sophie Eliott-Lynn) at Stag Lane Aerodrome. She was awarded her Royal Aero Club certificate on 26 January 1927, and quickly started a sporting career. She became the first woman to fly across the Irish Sea.

On 5 July 1927, she set a world's altitude record of 17,283 ft (5,268 m) in a two-seater light aircraft category, flying a de Havilland DH.60 Cirrus II Moth, her passenger was Louise de Havilland, the wife of aircraft designer Geoffrey de Havilland.

Between 9 March and 30 April 1928, Bailey made an 8,000 mi (7,000 nmi; 13,000 km) solo flight from Croydon to Cape Town, flying a Cirrus-engined de Havilland DH.60 Cirrus Moth with an extra fuel tank which gave an endurance of about 10 hours. At about the same time (January to May 1928), Lady Heath was flying solo from Cape Town to the UK.

She then made the 8,000 mi (7,000 nmi; 13,000 km) journey back between September 1928 and 16 January 1929. The return journey involved flying across the Belgian Congo, then along the southern edge of the Sahara and up the west coast of Africa, then across Spain and France back home again. It was the longest solo flight and longest flight accomplished by a woman that far. This feat won her the 1929 Britannia Trophy.

In 1927 and 1928, she twice won the Harmon Trophy as the world's outstanding aviatrix. She also participated in the Challenge International de Tourisme 1929, which she completed off the contest, and Challenge International de Tourisme 1930, in which she took 31st place for 60 participants, being one of only two women.

In 1930 she held a seat on the Women's Engineering Society Council. In 1931, she became a member of a group of female pioneers for science, the members of which shared her adventurous and determined spirit. That same year Bailey became the first woman in the United Kingdom to obtain a Certificate for Blind Flying. She also attained the rank of Section Officer in the Women's Auxiliary Air Force, during World War II.

== Contributions to archaeology ==
Bailey was also able to use her talents for aviation to take aerial photographs of important archaeological sites. She was very likely the first woman to accomplish this during her work in February 1931 on the Kharga Oasis project in Egypt. Working closely with Gertrude Caton-Thompson and Elinor Wight Gardner, Bailey was able to take aerial photographs which presented an expansive overview of the archaeological site within just two weeks. These photographs accomplished what would have taken far longer to do on foot. In addition, there also revealed future excavation sites.

== Honours ==
In 1930, Lady Bailey was appointed Dame Commander of the Order of the British Empire (DBE) and awarded the Britannia trophy for meritorious performance in the air.

== Family ==
She married the South African mining magnate, financier, and politician Abe Bailey on 5 September 1911 at the age of 20. She was his second wife. They had five children including Sir Derrick Bailey, 3rd Bt. (15 August 1918 – 19 June 2009) a fighter pilot cricketeer and businessman and James R A Bailey (23 October 1919 – 29 February 2000) fighter pilot, writer and co-founder of Drum magazine.
