= Travers Clarke =

British Army Officer

Lieutenant-General Sir Travers Clarke GBE KCB KCMG
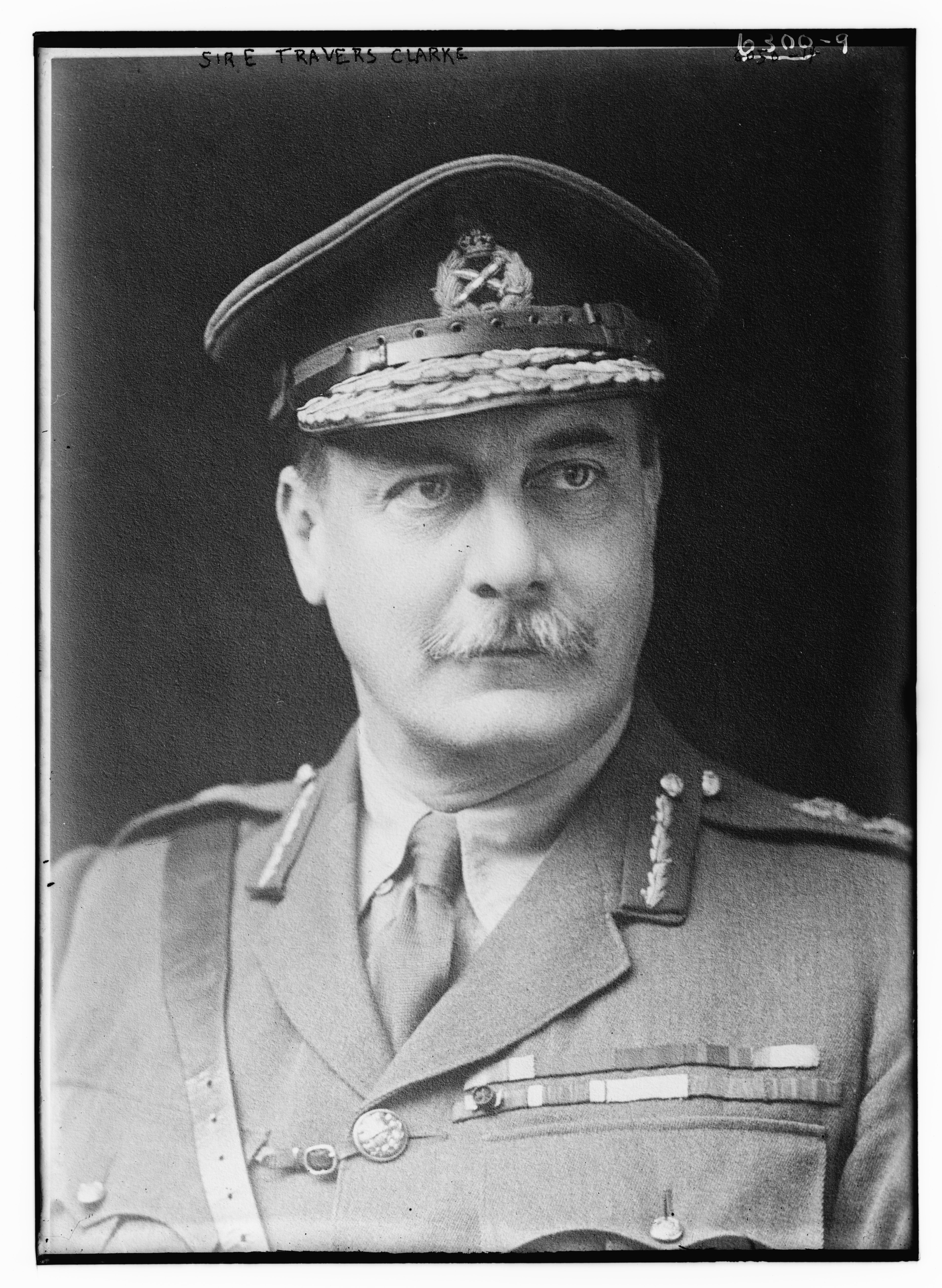
- Born: 6 April 1871; Clayhidon, Devon, England
- Died: 2 February 1962 (aged 90)
- Burial place: East Finchley Cemetery and Crematorium, East Finchley, London, England
- Military career
- Allegiance: United Kingdom
- Branch: British Army
- Service years: 1890–1926
- Rank: Lieutenant-General
- Unit: Royal Inniskilling Fusiliers
- Commands: 23rd Infantry Brigade
- Conflicts: Tirah Expedition; Second Boer War; First World War
- Awards: Knight Grand Cross of the Order of the British Empire; Knight Commander of the Order of the Bath; Knight Commander of the Order of St Michael and St George; Order of the White Eagle (Serbia)

Lieutenant-General Sir Travers Edwards Clarke (6 April 1871 – 2 February 1962) was a British Army officer who served in the Second Boer War and the First World War. During the First World War, he held various staff positions; he was Quartermaster-General to the Armies in France from 1917 to 1921, when he became Quartermaster-General to the Forces.

== Military career ==
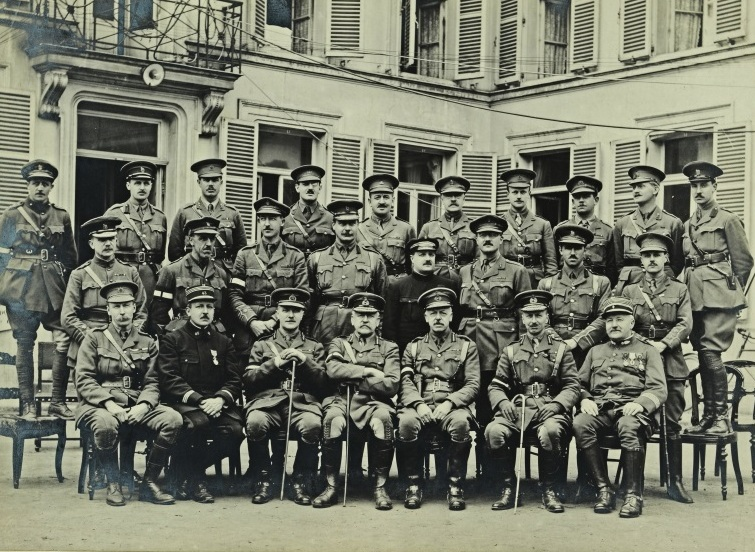
Lieutenant General Charles Monro (front row, centre, arms folded), GOC I Corps, and members of his corps staff in France, c. 1915. Stood in the second row, fourth from the left, is Travers Edward Clarke.

Clarke attended the Royal Military College, Sandhurst, and was commissioned as a second lieutenant into the Royal Inniskilling Fusiliers on 29 October 1890. He was promoted to lieutenant on 20 July 1892, and served with his regiment on the North West Frontier of India and in the Tirah Expedition of 1897–98, following which he was promoted to captain on 13 April 1898. Later the same year he was appointed adjutant of the 2nd Battalion of his regiment on 31 October 1898, serving until 31 October 1902. During these years, his battalion saw active service in the Second Boer War in South Africa from 1900 to 1902.

After peace was declared in June 1902, he left Cape Town to arrive in the United Kingdom the following month. For his service in South Africa, he received the Queen's South Africa Medal with four clasps. In March 1907 he succeeded Captain Louis Lipsett as a deputy assistant and quartermaster general during which time he was promoted to major in February 1910, and later served as a DAAG at the Staff College, Camberley, taking over from Lieutenant Colonel Hugh Jeudwine in January 1912.

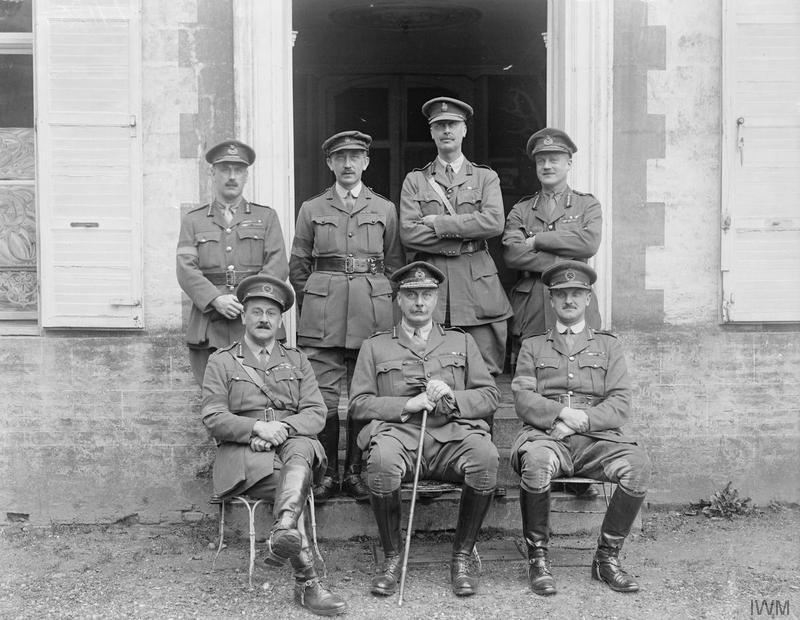
Lieutenant General Sir Travers Edwards Clarke, Quartermaster-General of the BEF, France from 23 December 1917 and some of his staff at GHQ Montreuil, 22 September 1918.

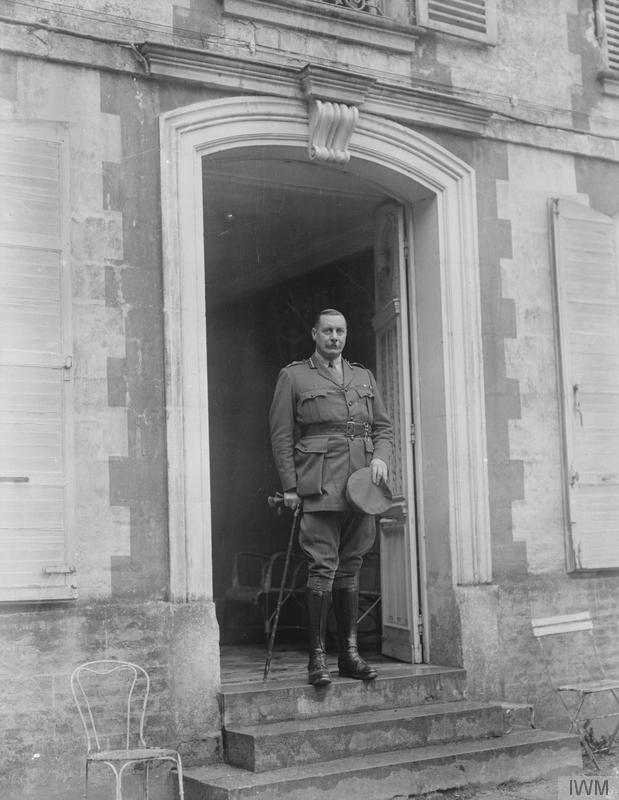
Major-General Travers Clarke, the Quartermaster General. Near Montreuil, 22 September 1918.

Clarke served in the First World War, being made an assistant quartermaster general in December 1914 He then briefly commanded the 23rd Infantry Brigade from July to September 1915, taking over from Major General Reginald Pinney, and for which he was promoted to the temporary rank of brigadier general. He was then made a deputy adjutant and quartermaster general. Later, after being promoted to temporary major general in June 1916, as quartermaster general for the British Armies in France from 1917. In January 1917 he was appointed a Companion of the Order of the Bath. In this role he was responsible for transferring Allied prisoners of war back to the United Kingdom and he strove to ensure they were treated properly and given clothing and blankets as they returned from Germany. He was subsequently appointed to the Order of the White Eagle by the King of Serbia.

After the war Clarke was promoted to the permanent rank of lieutenant general in June 1919 and became Quartermaster-General to the Forces; he retired in 1926. From January 1923 to 1941 he was the ceremonial colonel of the Royal Inniskilling Fusiliers, in which role he succeeded General Sir Archibald Murray.

Clarke was also Deputy Chairman of the British Empire Exhibition in 1924.

== Personal life ==
In 1911, Clarke married Mary Jordan, daughter of Sir John Jordan, the British ambassador to China. The couple had one son, John Walrond Edward Clarke (1913–1987) of Clough, County Down, before Mary's death in the outbreak of Spanish flu in 1918. He remarried in 1921, to Irene Roe (née Cross), the widow of an officer in the Iniskillings. By his second marriage, he had two sons: Evelyn, killed on active service in 1944, and John; and one daughter, Betty.

== Notes ==
Military offices
Preceded by Sir John Cowans	Quartermaster-General to the Forces; 1919–1923	Succeeded by Sir Walter Campbell
Honorary titles
Preceded by Sir Archibald Murray	Colonel of the Royal Inniskilling Fusiliers; 1923–1941	Succeeded by Sir Claude Auchinleck
