= Abe Bailey =

South African gold tycoon and politician (1864–1940)

Sir Abe Bailey Bt KCMG JP
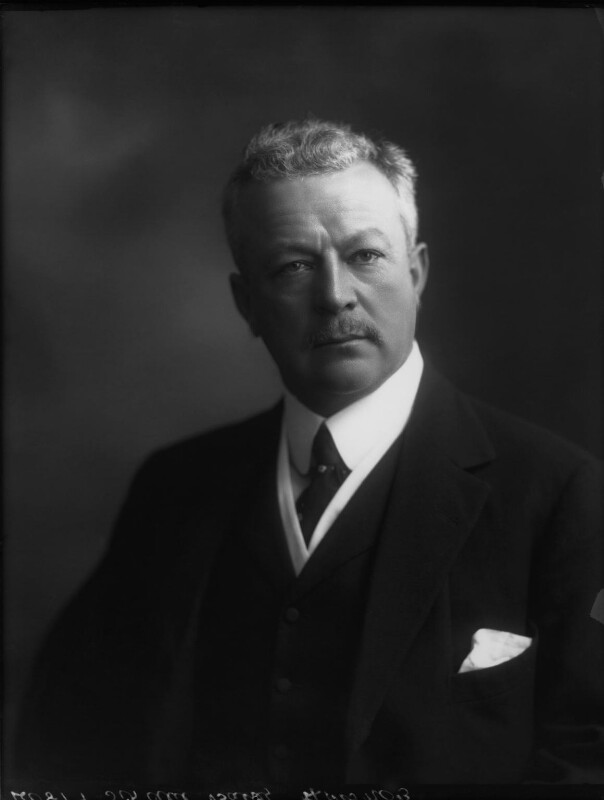
- Bailey in 1911
- Born: Abraham Bailey; 6 November 1864; Cradock, Cape Colony
- Died: 10 August 1940 (aged 75); Muizenberg, South Africa
- Spouses: Caroline Mary Paddon (m. 1894; died 1902) Mary Westenra (m. 1911)
- Children: 7, including Derrick and James

Sir Abraham Bailey, 1st Baronet KCMG JP (6 November 1864 – 10 August 1940), known as Abe Bailey, was a South African diamond and gold tycoon, politician, financier and cricketer.

== Early years ==
Bailey's mother, Ann Drummond McEwan, was Scottish by birth while his father, Thomas Bailey, was from Yorkshire, England. Married in 1860 in South Africa, Thomas and Ann Bailey had four children, Mary, Abraham, Susannah and Alice, before Ann Bailey's premature death in 1872, when young Abe was only seven years old. Abe Bailey was sent to England to be educated, first at Keighley and later at Clewer House.

After the outbreak of the Second Boer War in October 1899, a corps of imperial volunteers from London was formed in late December 1899. The corps included infantry, mounted infantry and artillery divisions and was authorized with the name City of London Imperial Volunteers. It proceeded to South Africa in January 1900, returned in October the same year, and was disbanded in December 1900. Bailey was appointed a lieutenant of the mounted infantry division on 3 January 1900, with the temporary rank of lieutenant in the army, but the appointment was later cancelled. He saw active service in South Africa with a different regiment, and returned to the United Kingdom in July 1900 on the RMS Dunottar Castle. In December 1902 he was appointed a captain in the Sussex Yeomanry.

== Politics, war and business ==
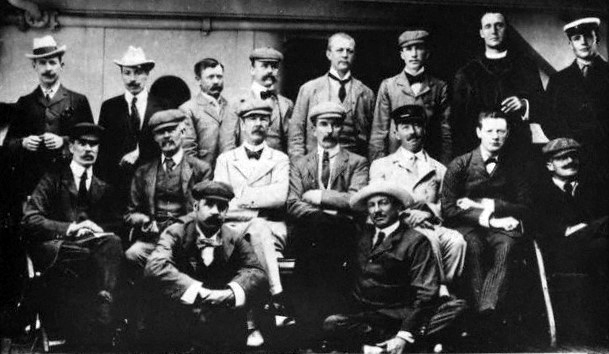
Returning from the Boer War on the RMS Dunottar Castle, July 1900. Standing L-R: Sir Byron Leighton, Claud Grenfel, Major Frederick Russell Burnham, Captain Gordon Forbes, Abe Bailey (his son John would marry Diana Churchill in 1932), next two unidentified, John Weston Brooke. Seated L-R: Major Bobby White, Lord Downe, General Sir Henry Edward Colville, Major Harry White, Major Joe Laycock, Winston Churchill, Sir Charles Bentinck. Sitting L-R: unidentified, Col. Maurice Gifford (who had lost his arm in the Second Matabele War).

In October 1902, Bailey stood unopposed as a Progressive Party candidate for the Barkly West constituency of the Cape Colony Legislative Assembly. The constituency had been represented by Cecil Rhodes until his death earlier the same year. Via his business interests and his ties to Rhodes, Bailey acquired substantial mining and land properties in the former Rhodesia. He was appointed a Knight Commander of the Order of St Michael and St George (KCMG) in 1911.

In the First World War, Bailey returned to military service as a major in the Union of South Africa forces and took part in the military campaign against German South West Africa. In response to a British War Office request, he recruited and financed a small sharpshooter’s unit to serve in Europe. Named "Bailey’s South African Sharpshooters", the unit fought in a British Division in France and Belgium from April 1916 to the Armistice, and is reckoned to have killed more than 3,000 Germans.

Post war Bailey was created Baronet in 1919, one of a number of "Randlords" (mining entrepreneurs) knighted for their services to the British Empire. By the 1930s he was one of the world's wealthiest men.

== Cricket ==
Abe Bailey
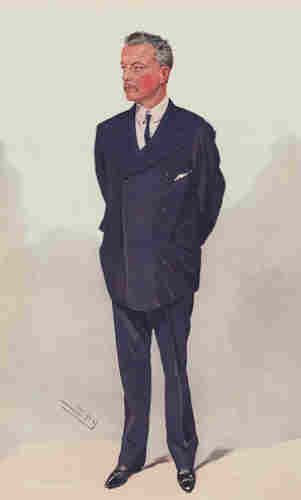

Cricket information
- Batting: Right-handed
- Bowling: Right-arm medium pace

Career statistics
Competition	First-class
Matches	3
Runs scored	16
Batting average	3.20
100s/50s	0/0
Top score	8
Balls bowled	470
Wickets	11
Bowling average	18.27
5 wickets in innings	0
10 wickets in match	0
Best bowling	4/51
Catches/stumpings	4/0
- Source: Cricinfo

Bailey played three first-class matches for Transvaal in the 1890s. Later he played an important role in initiating the 1912 Triangular Tournament between England, Australia and South Africa, who at the time were the only Test-playing countries. He first proposed the idea on a trip to England in 1907, stating: "Inter-rivalry within the Empire cannot fail to draw together in closer friendly interest all those many thousands of our kinsmen who regard cricket as our national sport, while secondly it would probably give a direct stimulus to amateurism."

The idea was immediately embraced by the Marylebone Cricket Club, who were then effectively in charge of cricket, and 1909 was the first year designated for the tournament. But the administrators could not agree and by the time 1912 was alighted on, world cricket was in conflict. Infighting and a poor performance from the South African team in 1912 ensured that the idea of a three-nation Test match tournament was not repeated.

== Art collection ==
These interests, as much as his aspirations to the titles and the lifestyle of the English landed gentry were influential in the formation of his personal art collection. This collection was mostly displayed in his London home and moved for safe-keeping to the north of England during the Second World War (1939–1945). On his death in 1940 the terms of his will placed his collection under the protection of a special trust established in his name and bequeathed it to the South African nation. Bailey was one of the very few South African Randlords to leave a bequest of this nature to South Africa.

At his specific recommendation, this collection was placed under the curatorship of the South African National Gallery in Cape Town, where it first went on display in 1947. Numbering over 400 items, including paintings, prints and drawings, the Sir Abe Bailey Bequest' is the largest bequest held at the South African National Gallery to this day. It also constitutes one of the largest collections of British sporting art held by any public art museum in the world. The Sir Abe Bailey Trust is actively involved in its maintenance, and conservation work on the collection.

== Abe Bailey Travel Bursary ==
Under the terms of his will annual travel bursaries are awarded to outstanding university students and young academics (less than 25 years old) to travel to the UK to widen their experience.

== Family ==
Abe Bailey
- Crest: A demi-female figure with arms extended Proper habited Azure trimmed at the collar cuffs and shoulders Argent holding in each hand a sprig of mimosa as in the arms.
- Shield: Argent on a fess between three martlets Gules a bezant between two sprigs of mimosa Proper.
- Motto: Virtus Castellum Meum

Bailey married twice. His first wife was the Hon. Caroline Mary Paddon; Caroline died 23 March 1902. They had two children:

1. Cecil Marguerite Bailey was born 8 June 1895. She married Dr William F Christie, died 29 June 1962.
2. Sir John Milner Bailey, 2nd Bt. born 15 June 1900 in East Grinstead; married, firstly, Diana Churchill (Note: eldest daughter of Sir Winston Churchill and Clementine Ogilvy Hozier) (1909–1963) on 12 December 1932 and divorced in 1935; married, secondly, Muriel Mullins on 18 October 1939 (divorced in 1945); married, lastly, Stella Mary Chiappini on 4 May 1945. He died on 13 February 1946 in Cape Town, South Africa.

Bailey's second marriage was to Hon. Mary Westenra (1 December 1890 – 29 July 1960), the daughter of Derrick Warner William Westenra, 5th Lord Rossmore, of Rossmore Castle, County Monaghan. Mary Westenra Bailey was the greatest British female aviator of her time, who "personally guided a plane from England to the nether tip of South Africa and back". In January 1930 she was made a Dame Commander of the Order of the British Empire (DBE) and was styled as Dame Mary Bailey. They had five children:

1. Mittie Mary Starr Bailey (1 August 1913 – 10 April 1961); married Robin Grant Lawson, son of Sir John Grant Lawson, 1st Bt. on 23 May 1934 (divorced in 1935); married, secondly, to William Frederick Lloyd in December 1935 (divorced in 1947); married, lastly, George Edward Frederick Rogers in 1947 (divorced in 1958).
2. Sir Derrick Thomas Louis Bailey, 3rd Bt. (b. 15 August 1918 – 19 June 2009); married, firstly, Katharine Nancy Darling on 18 July 1946 (divorced before 1980); married, secondly, Mrs Jean Roscoe in 1980 and divorced in 1990.
3. Ann Hester Zia Bailey (15 August 1918 – 3 October 1979); married, firstly, Pierce Nicholas Netterville Synnott (divorced).
4. James Richard Abe Bailey (23 October 1919 – 29 February 2000); married, firstly, Gillian Mary Parker in 1958 (divorced in 1963); married, secondly, Barbara Louise Epstein on 16 April 1964.
5. Noreen Helen Rosemary Bailey (27 July 1921 – 26 July 1999); married, firstly, Wing Commander Peter Anker Simmons on 27 January 1941; married, secondly, Count Peter Christian Raben-Levetzau, son of Count Siegfried Raben-Levetzau on 8 August 1947 (divorced in 1951).

== See also ==
- Statesmen of World War I
- General Officers of World War I
- Naval Officers of World War I

== Sources ==
- "Royal Honors". Time. 13 January 1930. Archived from the original on 23 May 2011.
- "Sir Abe Bailey Bequest". Archived from the original on 28 September 2007.

Baronetage of the United Kingdom
New creation	Baronet (of Cradock); 1919–1940	Succeeded by John Bailey
