= Arthur Stockdale Cope =

English painter

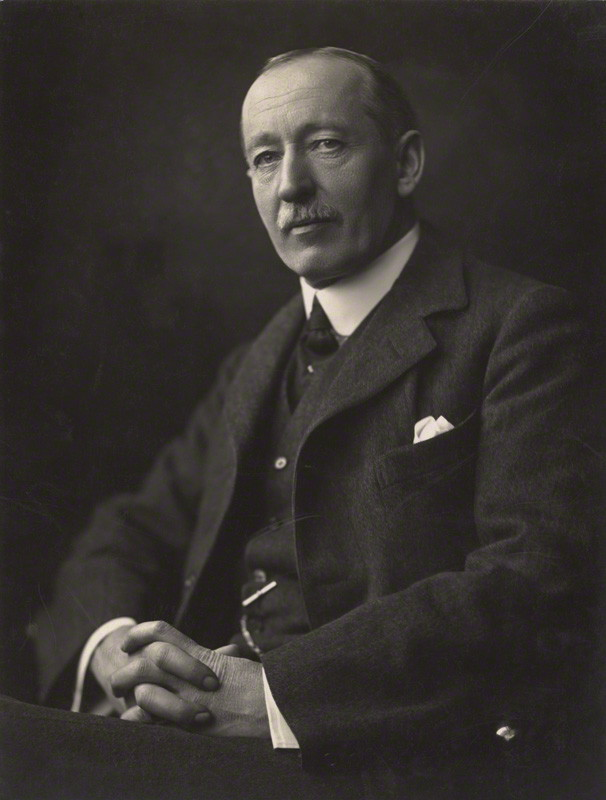
Arthur Stockdale Cope

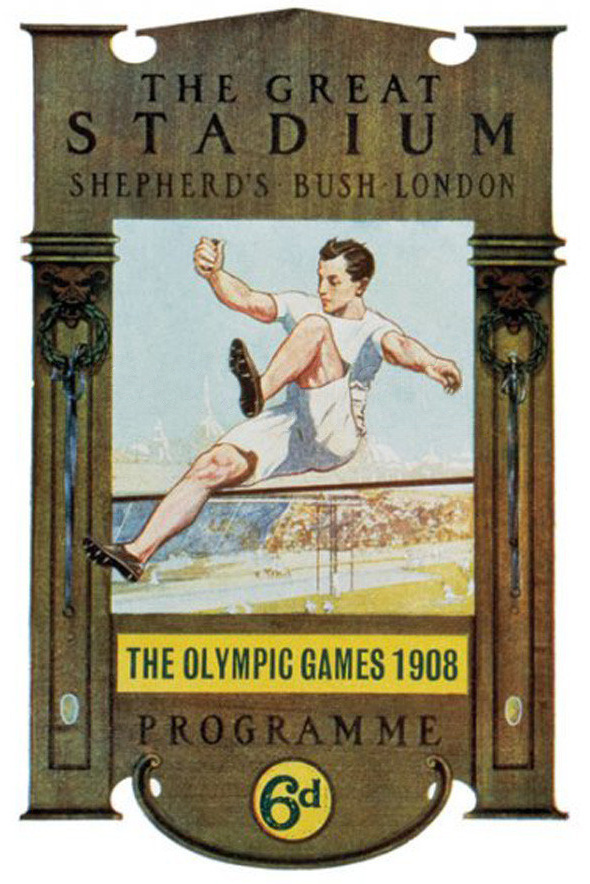
1908 London Olympics, a programme painted by Arthur Stockdale Cope

Sir Arthur Stockdale Cope, KCVO, RA (born 2 November 1857 – 5 July 1940) was a British portraitist.

== Biography ==
Cope was born on 2 November 1857, in South Kensington, London. His father was Charles West Cope (1811–1890), a successful history and genre painter, his mother was Charlotte Cope, née Benning (d. 1868). He attended Norwich Grammar School and Wiesbaden, before training in art at Cary’s Art School and then moving to the Royal Academy school in 1874.

He married Emily Beatrix Hawtayne on 6 September 1882, and the couple had two sons and a daughter. In 1927, Cope was appointed Knight Commander of the Royal Victorian Order and in 1933 he became a senior Royal Academician. He died on 5 July 1940 near Launceston, Cornwall. He is buried in Brookwood Cemetery (Plot 8).

== Works ==
Cope's first exhibited a work at the Royal Academy at the age of 19, and went on to establish his own portrait practice, exhibiting 288 works at the Royal Academy and the Royal Society of Portrait Painters between 1876 and 1935. He combined this prolific output with a prestigious roll call of sitters, ranging from Kings Edward VII, George V and Edward VIII, to Kaiser Wilhelm II and the Archbishop of Canterbury.

His clever use of fluid paint, striking colour and harsh artificial lighting are well seen in his portrait of Admiral of the Fleet Sir Frederick Richards in the National Maritime Museum, London (Greenwich Hospital Collection). His high-profile works and successful style won him many honours: in 1900 he became a fellow of the Royal Society of Portrait Painters; in 1910 he was elected Royal Academician; and in 1917 he was knighted. In addition to his busy painting practice, Cope established an art school in South Kensington and Vanessa Bell (1879–1961) was among his pupils.

== See also ==
- Naval Officers of World War I
