= Gifford (surname) =

Gifford is an English surname.

Notable people with the surname include:

- Adam Gifford, Lord Gifford (1820–1887), Scottish advocate; benefactor of the Gifford Lectures endowment
- Alden I. Gifford (1910–1995), American international businessman; diplomat to several countries in Latin America
- Baron Gifford, a title in the peerage of Great Britain and the various holders thereof
  - Robert Gifford, 1st Baron Gifford (1779–1826), lawyer, judge, and politician
  - Edric Gifford, 3rd Baron Gifford (1849–1911), recipient of the Victoria Cross
  - Anthony Maurice Gifford, 6th Baron Gifford (b. 1940), counsel in Guildford Four and Birmingham Six appeals
- Barry Gifford (born 1946), American writer
- Bertha Gifford (1871–1951), American serial killer
- Brenda Gifford (1968-), Australian Yuin classical composer
- Charles Gifford (Canadian politician) (1821–1896), member of the Ontario provincial legislature
- Charles Gifford (astronomer) (1861–1948), New Zealand explorer and astronomer
- Charles K. Gifford, bank executive at BankBoston and Bank of America, and corporate director of CBS
- Charles L. Gifford (1871–1947), United States Congressman from Massachusetts
- Chris Gifford (field hockey) (born 1966), field hockey striker from Canada
- Chris Gifford (writer), writer and executive producer at Nickelodeon
- Colin Gifford (born 1936), British railway photographer
- Dan Gifford (born 1962), American-born Canadian Anglican bishop
- Denis Gifford (1927–2000), British writer and comics illustrator
- Dino Gifford (1917–2013), Italian footballer
- Duncan Gifford (b. 1972), Australian pianist and piano teacher based in Spain
- Edward Winslow Gifford (1887–1959), American anthropologist at University of California Berkeley
- Edwin Gifford (1820–1905), Anglican priest and author
- Frances Gifford (1920–1994), American actress
- Frank Gifford (1930–2015), American athlete and sports commentator, husband of Kathie Lee Gifford
- Gabriel Gifford (1554–1629), Catholic Archbishop of Reims; also known as William Gifford
- George Gifford (disambiguation), several people
- Gilbert Gifford (1560–1590), double agent during years of Elizabeth I and Mary
- Grace Gifford (1888–1955), Irish artist and cartoonist and briefly wife of Joseph Plunkett
- Harry Gifford (songwriter) (1877–1960), English songwriter
- Harry Gifford (rugby league) (1884–1952), English rugby league footballer
- Hugh de Giffard (12th century), Scottish baron
- Irene Gifford, American politician
- James Gifford (disambiguation), several people
- Josh Gifford (1941–2012), English jockey
- Kathie Lee Gifford, American television host and singer; wife of Frank Gifford
- Luke Gifford (born 1995), American football player
- Maurice Gifford (1859–1910), son of 2nd Baron Gifford, British Army officer
- Muriel Gifford (1884–1917), Irish nationalist
- Nell Gifford (1973–2019), founding director of Giffords Circus
- Nellie Gifford (1880–1971), Irish republican activist
- Norman Gifford (1940–2026), English cricketer
- Oscar S. Gifford (1842–1913), United States Congressman from South Dakota
- Peter Gifford (b. 1955), Australian guitarist for Midnight Oil
- Richard Gifford (1725–1807), British poet
- Rob Gifford, (fl. 1994–present), British-born radio correspondent and author
- Robert Swain Gifford (1840–1905), United States landscape painter
- Robin Gifford (born 1974), Zimbabwean cricketer
- Sally Gifford, Canadian actress
- Sanford Robinson Gifford (1823–1880), American landscape painter
- Sidney Gifford (1889–1974), Irish writer and revolutionary
- Thomas Gifford (politician) (1854–1935), Canadian politician
- Thomas Gifford (1937–2000), American novelist
- Walter Sherman Gifford (1885–1966), American businessman and president of AT&T Corporation
- Will Gifford (born 1985), English cricketer
- William Gifford (1756–1826), English critic, poet and satirist
- Zerbanoo Gifford, British writer and human rights campaigner

== See also ==
- Gifford (disambiguation)
- Giffard
