= Gifford =

Gifford or Giffords may refer to:

== People ==
- Gifford (given name)
- Gifford (surname)
- Gabby Giffords (b. 1970), a former United States politician

== Places ==
=== Canada ===
- Gifford Peninsula, on the South Coast of British Columbia
- Gifford, British Columbia, a locality in the Matsqui Prairie area of the City of Abbotsford, British Columbia

=== England ===
- Aveton Gifford, Devon
- Bowers Gifford, Essex
- Broughton Gifford, Wiltshire
- Crowmarsh Gifford, Oxfordshire
- Fonthill Gifford, Wiltshire
- Stoke Gifford, Gloucestershire

=== Scotland ===
- Gifford, East Lothian
- Giffordland, North Ayrshire

=== United States ===
- Gifford Park, a neighborhood of Omaha, Nebraska
- Gifford, Florida
- Gifford, Idaho
- Gifford, Illinois
- Gifford, Indiana
- Gifford, Iowa
- Gifford, New York
- Gifford Creek (New York), a creek
- Gifford, Pennsylvania
- Gifford, South Carolina
- Gifford, Washington
- South Gifford, Missouri

== Enterprises ==
- Baillie Gifford, a UK investment management firm
- Gifford (company), a UK consulting engineering firm
- Gifford's Circus, a British circus
- Gifford's Ice Cream & Candy Co., a brand of ice cream, Washington DC, United States

== Other uses ==
- 4819 Gifford, a minor planet in the Solar System
- A. T. Gifford (ship), the last whaling schooner to cruise Hudson Bay
- Ashton Gifford House, Codford, Wiltshire, England
- Gifford Lectures, endowed by Scottish jurist Adam Gifford
- Gifford Observatory, Wellington, New Zealand
- Gifford Pinchot National Forest, Washington, United States
- Gifford Pinchot State Park, Pennsylvania, United States
- Gifford School, a special education school in Weston, Massachusetts, United States
- Gifford State Forest (Ohio)
- USS Gabrielle Giffords (LCS-10), a ship in the United States Navy
- HMS Gifford
- Mount Gifford, a mountain in New Zealand

== See also ==
- Lord Gifford (disambiguation)
- Giffard (disambiguation)
