= 1854 bombardment of Odessa =

1854 naval bombardment during the Crimean War

Bombardment of Odessa
- Part of the Crimean War
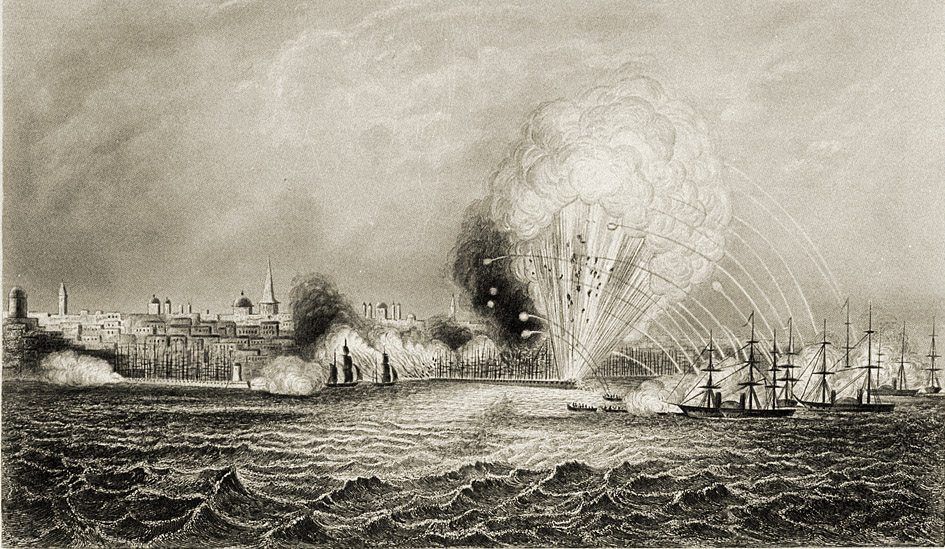
- Bombardment of Odessa, showing the explosion of the Imperial Mole
| Date | 22 April 1854 |
| Location | Odessa, Kherson Governorate, Russian Empire |
| Result | Franco-British victory |

Belligerents
| (Russian Empire) Russia | United Kingdom (Second French Empire) France |

Commanders and leaders
| (Russian Empire) Dmitri Osten-Sacken | (United Kingdom) James Dundas |

Strength
| Shore batteries and troops | 8 × steam paddle-wheel frigates; 1 × screw frigate; 1 × screw corvette; 1 × sailing frigate; 1 × screw ship; 6 × rocket-firing ship's boats |

Casualties and losses
| | 5 killed, 15 wounded |

The Bombardment of Odessa was an action during the Crimean War in which a joint Anglo-French squadron of warships attacked the Russian port of Odessa.

== Background and formation ==
On 6 April 1854, soon after the declaration of war by Britain and France on Russia, the British steam frigate Furious, under the command of Captain William Loring, sailed to Odessa and sent a boat into the port under a flag of truce to collect the British Consul there. When leaving the port the boat was fired upon by the Russians. The British naval commander Vice-Admiral James Dundas demanded an explanation from Lieutenant-General Dmitri Osten-Sacken, the military governor of Odessa, for this breach of the laws of war. His reply was considered unacceptable, so a squadron was quickly selected to mount a punitive expedition.

An article by Karl Marx, printed in the New York Daily Tribune of 16 May 1854, reported that the Russians had claimed that the Furious was actually carrying out a covert reconnaissance of the port, as the Retribution had done some time earlier, entering the port of Sevastopol under the pretext of delivering dispatches, but also making a survey of the defences, as had been admitted by the British press. Marx also pointed out the "ridiculousness" of the Allies requiring such justifications for launching an attack on an enemy naval base in a time of war.

The squadron consisted of eight steam paddle-wheel frigates; the French Descartes, Mogador and Vauban, and the British Furious, Retribution, Sampson, Terrible and Tiger, supported by the British screw frigate Highflyer, fourth-rate sailing frigate Arethusa, and steam ship Sans Pareil, and the French screw corvette Caton. There were also six ship's boats armed with 24-pounder rockets; two from Britannia, and one each from Agamemnon, Trafalgar, Sans Pareil and Highflyer.

== The bombardment ==
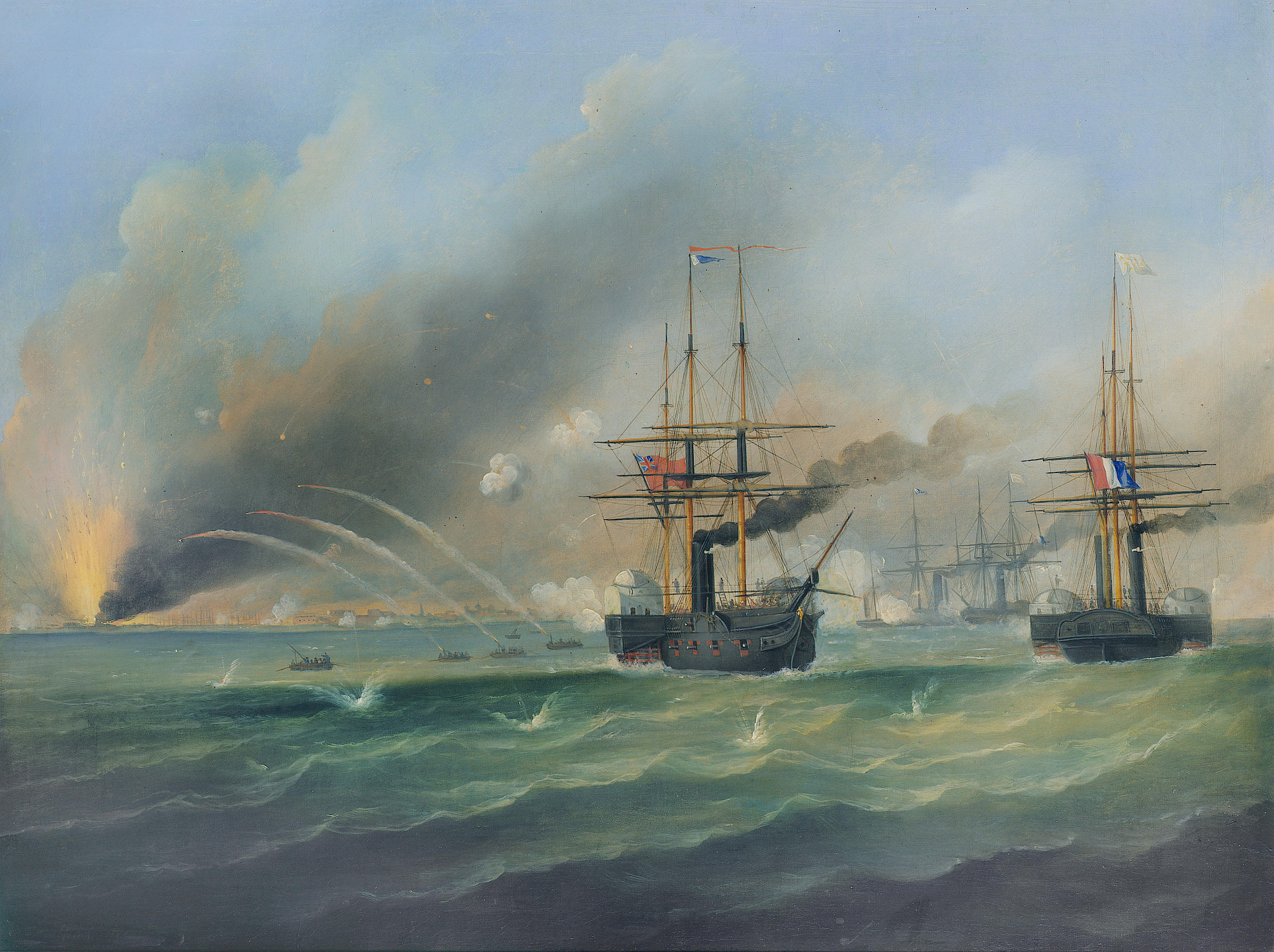
The Bombardment of Odessa, 22 April 1854, a painting by Francis Hustwick

On 22 April the Anglo-French fleet arrived off Odessa, and lay offshore. At 5 a.m. the first division (Descartes, Sampson, Tiger and Vauban) sailed in, and opened fire on the Russian positions from a range of about 2,000 yards (1,800 m), though with little effect. Vauban was hit by a red-hot shot that started a fire aboard and was obliged to temporarily withdraw. She soon returned, bringing the screw corvette Caton with her. The second division (Furious, Terrible, Retribution and Mogador) then joined the attack, while Arethusa, Highflyer and Sans Pareil remained further offshore as a reserve. The attacking ships now anchored closer in, and it was not long before a shot from Terrible hit a magazine on the Imperial Mole, which exploded causing great damage. About 24 Russian ships in the military port were set on fire, and several British and French merchant ships detained there took advantage of the confusion to escape. Meanwhile, the rocket-boats set fire to the dockyard storehouses. Late in the action the Arethusa, under the command of Captain William Robert Mends, engaged batteries on the south side of the Quarantine Mole, until recalled. As numerous fires were now threatening the town, the attack was ended at 5.30 p.m., and the squadron withdrew.

Casualties were very light; two killed and one wounded in Vauban, three wounded in Retribution, six wounded in Sampson, and one killed and four wounded in Terrible.

== Effects ==
As a result of this "affair of honour", Odessa was essentially neutralised as a naval base, and remained so for the rest of the war, allowing the Allies to operate in the Black Sea with impunity and to thus maintain their supply lines following the subsequent invasion of the Crimean Peninsula in September.

== Order of battle ==
First Division

- HMS Sampson (6 guns), Captain Lewis Tobias Jones.
- HMS Tiger (16 guns), Captain Henry Wells Giffard.
- Vauban (20 guns), Captaine de Poucques d'Herbinghem.
- Descartes (20 guns), Captaine Darricau.

Boat Division

- Six ship's boats armed with 24-pounder rockets, Commander J. B. Dickson.

Second Division

- HMS Furious (16 guns), Captain William Loring.
- HMS Terrible (21 guns), Captain James Johnstone McCleverty.
- HMS Retribution (28 guns), Captain the Hon. James Robert Drummond.
- Mogador (28 guns), Captaine Warnier de Wailly.

Reserve

- HMS Arethusa (50 guns), Captain William Robert Mends.
- HMS Sans Pareil (70 guns), Captain Sidney Colpoys Dacres.
- HMS Highflyer (21 guns), Captain John Moore.
- Caton (8 guns), Captaine Pothuau.
