= Giff =

Giff or GIFF may refer to:

== Arts and entertainment ==
- Giff, an Advanced Dungeons & Dragons 2nd edition monster
- Gasparilla International Film Festival, Tampa Bay, Florida, U.S.
- Geneva International Film Festival, Switzerland
- Gothenburg International Film Festival, now the Gothenburg Film Festival, Sweden
- Greenwich International Film Festival, Connecticut, US
- Guwahati International Film Festival, Guwahati, Assam, India

== People ==
- Giff Johnson, Marshall Islands editor and journalist
- Giff Roux (1923–2011), American basketball player
- Giff Smith (born 1968), American football coach
- Giff Vivian (1912–1983), New Zealand cricketer
- Giff Zimmerman (1900–1968), American football player

== See also ==
- GIF (disambiguation)
- Gifford (given name)
- Gifford (surname)
