= Prairieview-Ogden Community Consolidated School District 197 =

School district in Illinois, United States

Address
- 106 N. Vine Street Royal, Illinois, 61871; United States
- Coordinates: 36.4°N 05.3°E

District information
- Type: Public school district
- Grades: K–8
- Established: 2007
- Superintendent: Jeff Isenhower
- Schools: 3
- Budget: $4,008,000 (2015-16)
- NCES District ID: 1700330

Students and staff
- Enrollment: 260 (2018–2019)
- Teachers: 20.98 (on an FTE basis)
- Student–teacher ratio: 12.39
- District mascot: Mustang
- Colors: Orange and blue

Other information
- Website: www.pvo.k12.il.us

Prairieview-Ogden Community Consolidated School District 197 is a public school district in Champaign County, Illinois, United States. It was established in 2007 following the consolidation of Prairieview School District #192 and the Ogden Community Consolidated School District #212. It serves the villages of Ogden, Royal, the unincorporated communities of Flatville and Sellers, and the surrounding rural areas.

== Schools ==
There are three schools in the district:

- Prarireview-Ogden North (K-4), Royal
- Prairieview-Ogden South (K-6), Ogden
- Prairieview-Ogden Jr High School (7-8), Flatville
