= George Gifford =

George Gifford may refer to:

- George Gifford (Puritan) (c. 1548–1600), Puritan preacher
- George Gifford (by 1502–43 or later), Member of Parliament (MP) for Midhurst
- George Gifford (died 1557) (by 1496–1557), MP for Buckingham
- George Gifford (died 1613) (1552–1613), MP for Morpeth and Cricklade
- George Gifford (cricketer) (1891–1972), English cricketer

== See also ==
- George Gifford Symes (1840–1893), U.S. Representative
- George Giffard (1886–1964), British military officer
- George Markham Giffard (1813–1870), English barrister and judge
- George Augustus Giffard, Royal Navy officer
