= Ogden, Illinois =

Ogden
- Village
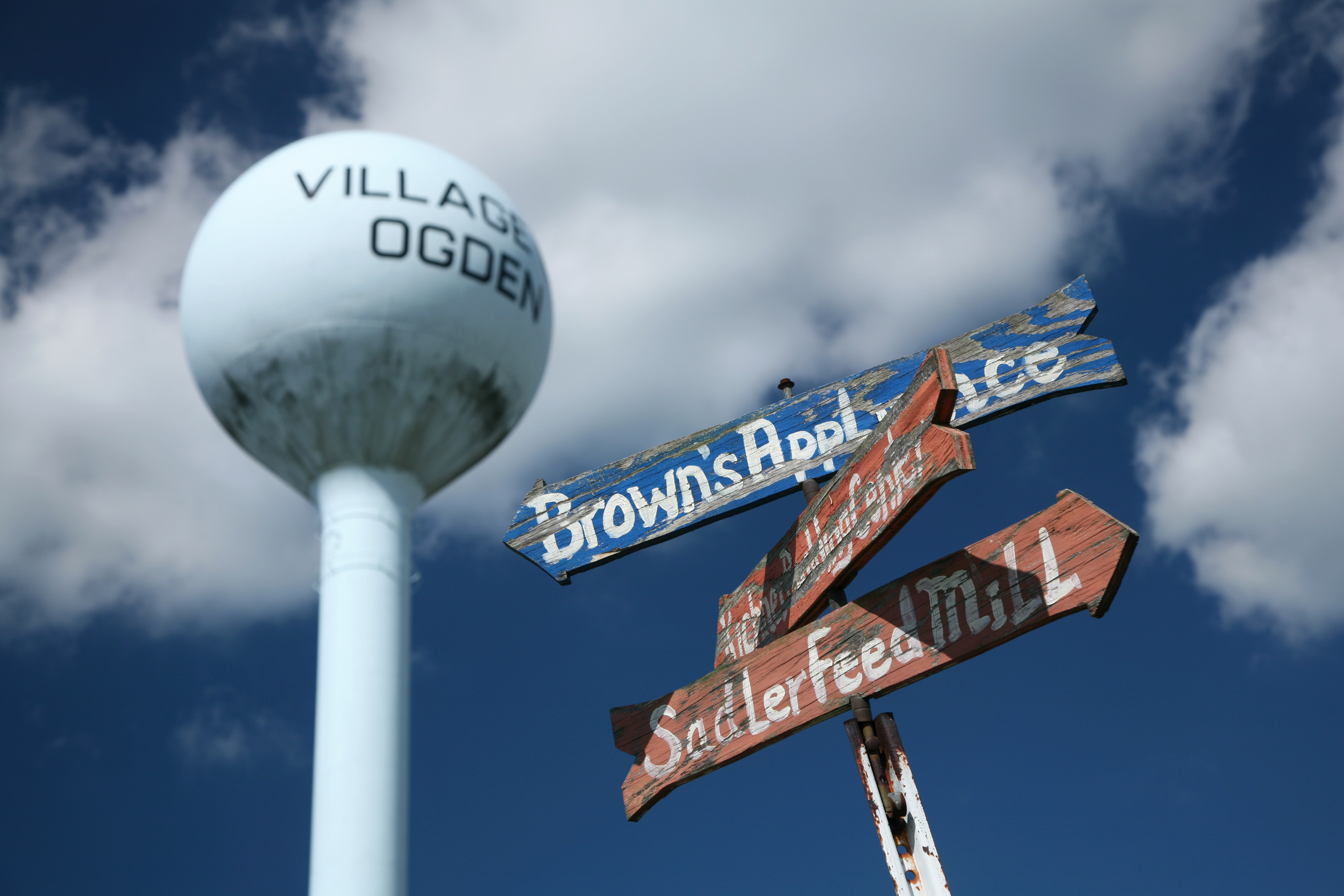
- Watertower and signposts in Ogden

- Location of Ogden in Champaign County, Illinois.

- Location within Champaign County Ogden (Illinois)
- Coordinates: 40°06′54″N 87°57′23″W
- Country: United States
- State: Illinois
- County: Champaign
- Founded: 1870

Area
  - Total: 0.59 sq mi (1.52 km^{2})
  - Land: 0.59 sq mi (1.52 km^{2})
  - Water: 0 sq mi (0.00 km^{2})
- Elevation: 669 ft (204 m)

Population (2020)
  - Total: 729
  - Density: 1,239.6/sq mi (478.63/km^{2})
- Time zone: UTC-6 (CST)
  - Summer (DST): UTC-5 (CDT)
- Zip code: 61859
- Area code: 217
- FIPS code: 17-55275
- GNIS feature ID: 2399561
- Website: http://www.ogdenil.com/

Ogden is a village in Champaign County, Illinois, United States. At the time of the 2020 census, the population was 729.

== History ==
A tornado did extensive damage to the downtown area of Ogden in March 1976, and a devastating F-3 tornado with winds estimated at 170 mph hit Ogden on April 19, 1996, leaving a path of destruction from one end of town to the other. When the 1996 tornado was over, more than 200 homes received major damage, 80 homes were completely destroyed and 13 people suffered minor injuries. With help from government agencies, surrounding communities, and thousands of volunteers; Ogden recovered under the leadership of Mayor Jim Gilliland. Over the years Ogden has proven itself a resilient community with supportive and caring residents.

The Kickapoo Rail Trail (KRT) runs through Ogden and is one of the few paved sections of the trail that runs from Urbana to Danville.

In 2022, Ogden area citizens formed a village volunteer group called Onward Ogden that is running many events and has taken an active interest in the village. Onward Ogden's Park and Recreation group has been very active in creating more inviting spaces and helping maintain the village's parks and play grounds. There are numerous bird houses assembled and painted by area students that are hung throughout the village. Onward Ogden also fundraises and organizes setting up and lighting all three parks for Christmas.

== Geography ==
According to the 2021 census gazetteer files, Ogden has a total area of 0.59 square miles (1.53 km^{2}), all land.

=== Climate ===
Climate data for Ogden, Illinois (1991–2020)
Month	Jan	Feb	Mar	Apr	May	Jun	Jul	Aug	Sep	Oct	Nov	Dec	Year
Mean daily maximum °F (°C)	34.0 (1.1)	38.9 (3.8)	50.6 (10.3)	63.7 (17.6)	73.3 (22.9)	81.6 (27.6)	83.6 (28.7)	82.6 (28.1)	77.9 (25.5)	65.7 (18.7)	51.1 (10.6)	39.3 (4.1)	61.9 (16.6)
Daily mean °F (°C)	26.1 (−3.3)	30.3 (−0.9)	40.4 (4.7)	52.3 (11.3)	62.9 (17.2)	71.8 (22.1)	74.4 (23.6)	72.8 (22.7)	66.8 (19.3)	55.0 (12.8)	41.8 (5.4)	31.6 (−0.2)	52.2 (11.2)
Mean daily minimum °F (°C)	18.2 (−7.7)	21.6 (−5.8)	30.2 (−1.0)	40.8 (4.9)	52.4 (11.3)	62.0 (16.7)	65.1 (18.4)	62.9 (17.2)	55.7 (13.2)	44.3 (6.8)	32.4 (0.2)	23.9 (−4.5)	42.5 (5.8)
Average precipitation inches (mm)	2.38 (60)	2.18 (55)	2.82 (72)	3.88 (99)	4.96 (126)	4.96 (126)	4.39 (112)	3.50 (89)	3.35 (85)	3.32 (84)	3.15 (80)	2.35 (60)	41.24 (1,048)
Average snowfall inches (cm)	5.9 (15)	9.3 (24)	3.0 (7.6)	0.3 (0.76)	0.0 (0.0)	0.0 (0.0)	0.0 (0.0)	0.0 (0.0)	0.0 (0.0)	0.0 (0.0)	1.0 (2.5)	5.5 (14)	25 (63.86)
Source: NOAA

== Demographics ==
Historical population
Census	Pop.	Note	%±
1880	239		—
1890	334		39.7%
1900	419		25.4%
1910	428		2.1%
1920	448		4.7%
1930	443		−1.1%
1940	431		−2.7%
1950	436		1.2%
1960	515		18.1%
1970	703		36.5%
1980	818		16.4%
1990	671		−18.0%
2000	743		10.7%
2010	810		9.0%
2020	729		−10.0%
U.S. Decennial Census

As of the 2020 census there were 729 people, 312 households, and 192 families residing in the village. The population density was 1,239.80 inhabitants per square mile (478.69/km^{2}). There were 324 housing units at an average density of 551.02 per square mile (212.75/km^{2}). The racial makeup of the village was 97.39% White, 0.14% African American, 0.14% Asian, 0.82% from other races, and 1.51% from two or more races. Hispanic or Latino of any race were 1.78% of the population.

There were 312 households, out of which 31.7% had children under the age of 18 living with them, 43.91% were married couples living together, 8.97% had a female householder with no husband present, and 38.46% were non-families. 28.85% of all households were made up of individuals, and 16.99% had someone living alone who was 65 years of age or older. The average household size was 3.16 and the average family size was 2.48.

The village's age distribution consisted of 25.2% under the age of 18, 6.9% from 18 to 24, 24.8% from 25 to 44, 21.1% from 45 to 64, and 22.0% who were 65 years of age or older. The median age was 36.4 years. For every 100 females, there were 81.9 males. For every 100 females age 18 and over, there were 84.7 males.

The median income for a household in the village was $62,500, and the median income for a family was $80,625. Males had a median income of $48,906 versus $36,750 for females. The per capita income for the village was $29,814. About 4.7% of families and 7.4% of the population were below the poverty line, including 7.2% of those under age 18 and 14.7% of those age 65 or over.

== Education ==
It is in the Prairieview-Ogden Community Consolidated School District 197 and the St. Joseph-Ogden Community High School District 305.

The public high school district for the community of Ogden is St. Joseph-Ogden High School #305, a school that combines the village of St. Joseph Middle School with Ogden's Prairieview-Ogden Junior High in Flatville, Illinois. The local K–6 grade school is Prairieview-Ogden South Elementary School #197.

Some of the students in the Praireview-Ogden School District will go to neighboring high school in St. Joseph, Illinois.
