= John Gifford =

John Gifford may refer to:

- John Gifford (pastor) (died 1655), English pastor and counselor to John Bunyan
- John Gifford (writer) (1758–1818), English political writer
- John Gifford (died 1875), whose shooting with Louis Mailloux led to the Louis Mailloux Affair
- Sir John Gifford (died 1736), 2nd Baronet of the Gifford baronets
- John Clayton Gifford (1870–1949), America naturalist and forester
- John Hoskins Gifford (c. 1693–1744), British politician
- Jack Gifford (John F. Gifford, 1941–2009), American engineer and businessman
- Rufus Gifford (John Rufus Gifford, born 1974), American diplomat

== See also ==
- John Giffard (disambiguation)
