= Giffard =

Giffard is an Anglo-Norman surname, carried by a number of families of the Peerage of the United Kingdom and the landed gentry. They included the Earls of Halsbury and the Giffards of Chillington Hall, Staffordshire. Notable people with the surname include:

== People with the surname ==
- Anna Marcella Giffard (1707–1777), Irish stage actress
- Bonaventure Giffard (1642–1734), Roman Catholic bishop, Vicar Apostolic of the Midland District of England 1687–1703
- Daniel Giffard (born 1984), English speedway rider
- Sir George Giffard (1886–1964), British Army general
- George Augustus Giffard (1849–1925), Royal Navy officer
- Sir George Markham Giffard (1813–1870), English barrister and judge
- Godfrey Giffard (c.1235–1302), English politician and bishop
- Graham Giffard (born 1959), Australian politician
- Hardinge Giffard, 1st Earl of Halsbury (1823–1921), English barrister and politician
- Henri Giffard, (1825–1882), French engineer and inventor
- Henry Giffard (1694–1772), English actor and theatre manager
- Henry Wells Giffard (1811–1854), Royal Navy officer, Captain of HMS Tiger (1849)
- Hugh de Giffard (died 1267), Norman-Scottish feudal baron
- John Giffard (disambiguation), several people
- Osbern Giffard (1020–1085), one of William the Conqueror's knights
- Nicolas Giffard (born 1950), French chess master
- Pierre Giffard (1853–1922), French journalist
- Robert Giffard de Moncel (1587–1668), French surgeon, colonist and businessman
- Sir Sydney Giffard (1926–2020), British diplomat and author
- Sir Thomas Giffard (c.1491–1560), English courtier, landowner and MP
- Walter Giffard, Lord of Longueville (died 1084), Norman baron and companion of William the Conqueror
- Walter Giffard (c.1225–1279), Chancellor of England and Archbishop of York
- Walter Giffard, 1st Earl of Buckingham (died 1102), Anglo-Norman magnate and Justiciar of England
- Walter Giffard, 2nd Earl of Buckingham (died 1164), English peer
- Walter Giffard (Oxford), English medieval theologist and university administrator
- William Giffard (died 1129), Lord Chancellor of England

== See also ==
- Giffard Cove on the west coast of Graham Land, Antarctica
- Sir Giffard Le Quesne Martel (1889–1958), British Army general
- Giffard dirigible built by Henri Giffard
- Gifford (disambiguation)
- Gyffard partbooks
