= Thomas Gifford (disambiguation) =

Thomas Gifford was an American author.

Thomas Gifford may also refer to:

- Thomas Gifford (politician) (1854–1935), politician in British Columbia, Canada
- Thomas Carlyle Gifford (1881–1975)
- Thomas Gifford of the Gifford baronets

== See also ==
- Gifford (disambiguation)
