= Compromise Township, Champaign County, Illinois =

Compromise Township
- Township
- Location in Champaign County

- Champaign County's location in Illinois
- Coordinates: 40°15′57″N 88°00′46″W
- Country: United States
- State: Illinois
- County: Champaign

Area
  - Total: 47.75 sq mi (123.7 km^{2})
  - Land: 47.75 sq mi (123.7 km^{2})
  - Water: 0 sq mi (0 km^{2}) 0%
- Elevation: 709 ft (216 m)

Population (2020)
  - Total: 1,323
  - Density: 27.71/sq mi (10.70/km^{2})
- Time zone: UTC-6 (CST)
  - Summer (DST): UTC-5 (CDT)
- FIPS code: 17-019-15976

Compromise Township is a township in Champaign County, Illinois, USA. As of the 2020 census, its population was 1,323 and it contained 586 housing units.

== History ==
Compromise Township formed from parts of Kerr Township and Rantoul Township on an unknown date.

== Geography ==
Compromise is Township 21 North, parts of Ranges 10 and 11 East of the Third Principal Meridian and part of Range 14 West of the Second Principal Meridian. When the federal township land surveys were done in 1821 one group of surveyors went west from the Second Principal Meridian and another went east from the Third Principal Meridian. Both groups used rawhide measuring lines that expanded and contracted with the weather. When the two groups met in eastern Champaign County the surveys didn't agree, resulting in double section numbers in the eastern townships and ongoing property line confusion among landowners.

According to the 2010 census, the township has a total area of 47.75 square miles (123.7 km^{2}), all land.

=== Cities and towns ===
- Gifford (south three-quarters)

=== Unincorporated towns ===
- Flatville
- Gerald
- Penfield

(This list is based on USGS data and may include former settlements.)

=== Cemeteries ===
The township contains these cemeteries: Huls, Kopman, Saint Lawrence and Welles.

=== Major highways ===
- U.S. Route 136

=== Airports and landing strips ===
- Busboom Airport

== Demographics ==
As of the 2020 census there were 1,323 people, 621 households, and 459 families residing in the township. The population density was 27.69 inhabitants per square mile (10.69/km^{2}). There were 586 housing units at an average density of 12.26 per square mile (4.73/km^{2}). The racial makeup of the township was 93.27% White, 0.68% African American, 0.15% Native American, 0.38% Asian, 0.00% Pacific Islander, 0.68% from other races, and 4.84% from two or more races. Hispanic or Latino of any race were 1.89% of the population.

There were 621 households, out of which 30.30% had children under the age of 18 living with them, 63.77% were married couples living together, 7.25% had a female householder with no spouse present, and 26.09% were non-families. 18.70% of all households were made up of individuals, and 10.30% had someone living alone who was 65 years of age or older. The average household size was 2.62 and the average family size was 2.89.

The township's age distribution consisted of 27.7% under the age of 18, 4.2% from 18 to 24, 21.6% from 25 to 44, 24.1% from 45 to 64, and 22.4% who were 65 years of age or older. The median age was 42.2 years. For every 100 females, there were 100.0 males. For every 100 females age 18 and over, there were 99.0 males.

The median income for a household in the township was $79,063, and the median income for a family was $88,295. Males had a median income of $49,815 versus $42,083 for females. The per capita income for the township was $34,271. About 2.8% of families and 4.1% of the population were below the poverty line, including 1.6% of those under age 18 and 4.9% of those age 65 or over.

Historical population
Census	Pop.	Note	%±
2010	1,463		—
2020	1,323		−9.6%
U.S. Decennial Census
