= James Gifford =

James Gifford may refer to:

- James Gifford (sportsman) (1864–1931), Argentine footballer and cricketer
- James Gifford (Royal Navy officer) (1768–1853), British navy officer
- James Gifford the elder (c. 1739–1813), British Army officer
- Jim Gifford (James H. Gifford, 1845–1901), manager in Major League Baseball
