= Kerr Township, Champaign County, Illinois =

Kerr Township
- Township
- Location in Champaign County

- Champaign County's location in Illinois
- Coordinates: 40°21′35″N 87°57′48″W
- Country: United States
- State: Illinois
- County: Champaign
- Established: November 8, 1859

Area
  - Total: 22.25 sq mi (57.6 km^{2})
  - Land: 22.11 sq mi (57.3 km^{2})
  - Water: 0.14 sq mi (0.36 km^{2}) 0.63%
- Elevation: 705 ft (215 m)

Population (2020)
  - Total: 183
  - Density: 8.28/sq mi (3.20/km^{2})
- Time zone: UTC-6 (CST)
  - Summer (DST): UTC-5 (CDT)
- FIPS code: 17-019-39688

Kerr Township is a township in Champaign County, Illinois, USA. As of the 2020 census, its population was 183 and it contained 64 housing units.

== History ==
Initially called Middle Fork Township, the name was changed in 1861 to Kerr Township, after early settler and township supervisor Samuel Kerr (d. 1854). In 1869, the southern half of the township was transferred to Compromise Township.

== Geography ==
Kerr is Township 22 North, Range 11 East of the Third Principal Meridian and part of Range 14 West of the Second Principal Meridian. When the federal township land surveys were done in 1821 one group of surveyors went west from the Second Principal Meridian and another went east from the Third Principal Meridian. Both groups used rawhide measuring lines that expanded and contracted with the weather. When the two groups met in eastern Champaign County the surveys didn't agree, resulting in double section numbers in the eastern townships and ongoing property line confusion among landowners.

According to the 2010 census, the township has a total area of 22.25 square miles (57.6 km^{2}), of which 22.11 square miles (57.3 km^{2}) (or 99.37%) is land and 0.14 square miles (0.36 km^{2}) (or 0.63%) is water. The stream of Sugar Creek runs through this township.

=== Cemeteries ===
The township contains four cemeteries: Chenoweth, Patton, Peabody and Tomlinson.

=== Major highways ===
- U.S. Route 136

== Demographics ==
As of the 2020 census there were 183 people, 46 households, and 35 families residing in the township. The population density was 8.21 inhabitants per square mile (3.17/km^{2}). There were 64 housing units at an average density of 2.87 per square mile (1.11/km^{2}). The racial makeup of the township was 89.62% White, 3.83% African American, 0.00% Native American, 0.00% Asian, 0.00% Pacific Islander, 1.64% from other races, and 4.92% from two or more races. Hispanic or Latino of any race were 2.73% of the population.

There were 46 households, out of which 39.10% had children under the age of 18 living with them, 69.57% were married couples living together, 6.52% had a female householder with no spouse present, and 23.91% were non-families. 19.60% of all households were made up of individuals, and 13.00% had someone living alone who was 65 years of age or older. The average household size was 2.91 and the average family size was 3.43.

The township's age distribution consisted of 35.1% under the age of 18, 0.0% from 18 to 24, 22.4% from 25 to 44, 23.9% from 45 to 64, and 18.7% who were 65 years of age or older. The median age was 35.8 years. For every 100 females, there were 127.1 males. For every 100 females age 18 and over, there were 97.7 males.

The median income for a household in the township was $71,250, and the median income for a family was $109,063. Males had a median income of $57,188 versus $34,531 for females. The per capita income for the township was $33,134. None of the population wasbelow the poverty line.

Historical population
Census	Pop.	Note	%±
2010	163		—
2020	183		12.3%
U.S. Decennial Census
