= Dennis J. Collins =

American politician, lawyer, and farmer

Member of the Illinois House of Representatives from the 35th district
- In office 1931–1942

Member of the Illinois Senate from the 35th district
- In office 1943–1968

Member of the Illinois Senate from the 33rd district
- In office 1969–1972

Personal details
- Committees: House Agricultural Committee (chairman); Senate Agricultural Committee (chairman)

Dennis J. Collins (November 21, 1900 – September 5, 1974) was an American lawyer, farmer, and businessman.

== Biography ==
Collins was born in Gifford, Illinois. In 1910, Collins moved with his family to DeKalb, Illinois and went to the DeKalb public schools. Collins graduated from University of Illinois Urbana-Champaign in 1928 and Northwestern University School of Law. Collins also went to Northern Illinois University. He was admitted to the Illinois bar in 1928 and practiced law in DeKalb, Illinois. Collins was also a farmer and owned commercial property. He served in the Illinois House of Representatives from 1931 to 1943 and in the Illinois Senate from 1943 until 1973. He was a Republican. Collins died in DeKalb, Illinois.
