= Alexander William Bickerton =

British scientist (1842–1929)

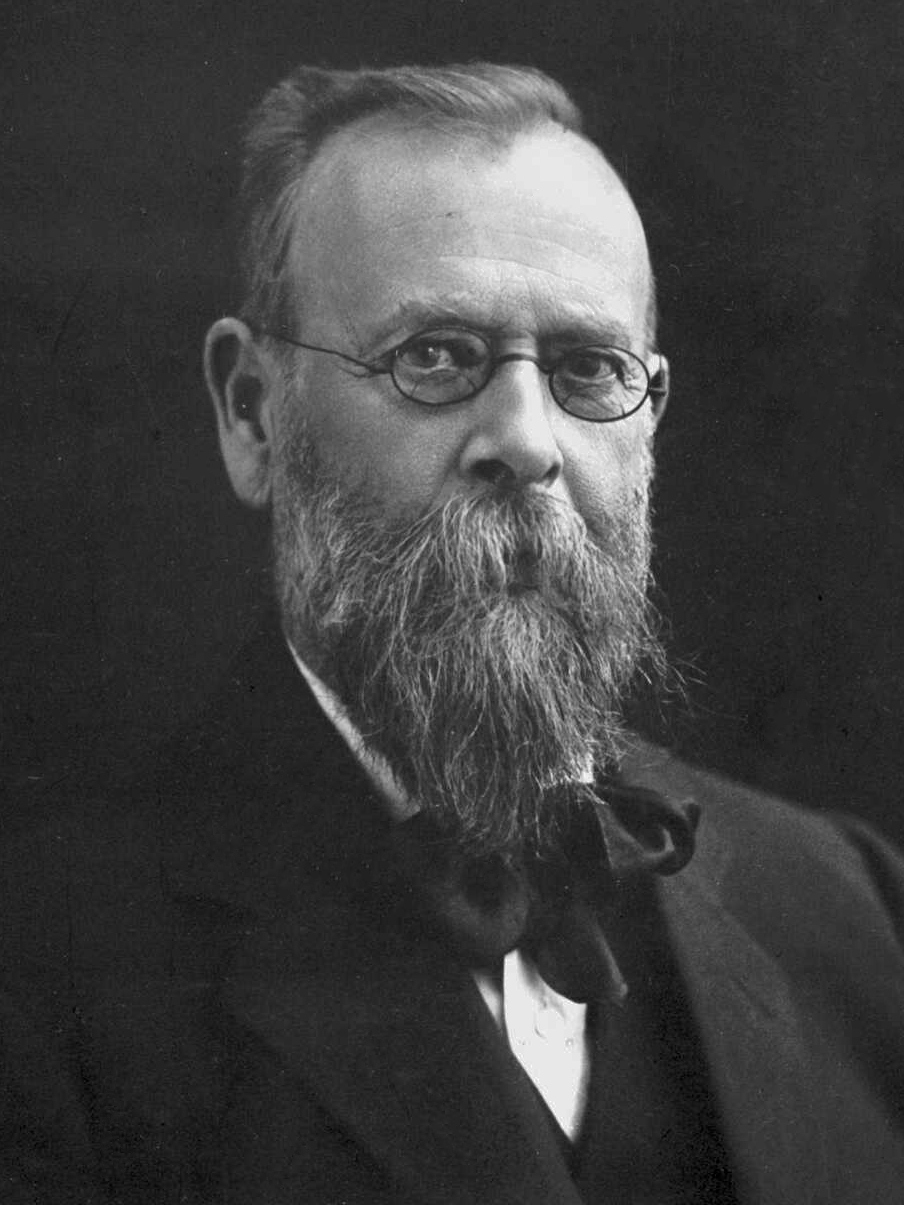
- Bickerton c. 1905
- Born: 7 January 1842; Alton, Hampshire, England
- Died: 21 January 1929 (aged 87); London, England
- Education: Royal School of Mines; Canterbury College
- Known for: Partial impact theory
- Scientific career
- Fields: Physics, chemistry, astrophysics
- Academic advisors: Moses Pullen; Edward Frankland; John Tyndall; Thomas Huxley
- Notable students: Ernest Rutherford; Ettie Rout; Charles Gifford

Alexander William Bickerton (7 January 1842 – 21 January 1929) was an English-born chemist and educator who was the first professor of chemistry at Canterbury College (now called the University of Canterbury) in Christchurch, New Zealand. He is best known for teaching and mentoring Ernest Rutherford. He was a natural teacher though an eccentric one, who taught science in an exciting way. His differences were not limited to teaching as he formed a socialist community in Christchurch, which he later set up as a theme park. His partial impact theory explaining the appearance of temporary stars was the major work of his lifetime.

== Early life ==
Alexander William Bickerton was born on 7 January 1842 at Alton in Hampshire, England, the second son of Richard Bickerton, a builder's clerk, and Sophia Eames. His parents had both died before he left school. After not excelling at grammar school his uncle found him work in a railway workshop and later he worked in an engineering office. With inheritance money he set up a wood-working factory using machines that he had invented, but by 1864 the factory was in debt.

== Teaching in England ==
In about 1864 Bickerton started attending science classes held in the area. His teacher, Moses Pullen, realised Bickerton had a natural talent for the subject and suggested he take up teaching science. By 1866 Bickerton was teaching science in Birmingham, and while he was there he sat examinations for the Royal Exhibition for the School of Mines where he gained honours. In 1867 he moved to London where he was taught by prominent scientists of the time Edward Frankland, John Tyndall and Thomas Huxley. These influences increased Bickerton's passion to teach, but London was not as receptive to science teaching as Birmingham had been, and Bickerton's first class attracted just one person. To attract more students he looked at how successful preachers drew in large numbers. From his observations he said: "to instruct the Londoner you must make your class as entertaining as a music-hall and as sensational as a circus." This would characterise his teaching throughout his career. Before long his classes became very popular, and by 1869 he was teaching hundreds of students. In 1870 he took up a job offer to organise science work at the Hartley Institute, a position he held for three years until he became unhappy with conditions and sought other work.

== Life in New Zealand ==
In 1873 the Canterbury College (now known as the University of Canterbury) was established in New Zealand. It was here Bickerton taught Ernest Rutherford where the two became lifelong friends and Bickerton became a mentor to Rutherford. Bickerton was offered the position of Chair of Chemistry and after acceptance he arrived with his wife and four children in Christchurch, New Zealand in June 1874. His new job was made harder without lecture rooms, and few students due to science not being taught at secondary schools at the time. To increase interest he held night classes for adults, and basic chemistry classes for school children. As in London, his reputation grew and he became known as a brilliant teacher.

In 1878 he formed his partial impact theory, which he would try to prove for the rest of his life. The theory explains the appearance of bright new stars appearing in the sky due to two dark bodies colliding in space and forming a temporary bright third star as they move past each other. Locally it was thought to be a major astronomic breakthrough, though it failed to gain international support. Bickerton himself believed that the idea would eventually gain acceptance from the scientific community, and he pursued the theory throughout his life. Towards the end of the 19th century he was blamed for digressing into his own theory too often in class, and this was used as a reason by the Board of Governors to try to remove him from his position. Bickerton was often at odds with the Board due to his different teaching style, socialist views, and disrespect towards the church. In 1894 the Board launched an enquiry into how his department was run, but thanks to influential friends Bickerton kept his job. Unfortunately for him, in 1902 the Board of Governors finally removed him from his job, Bickerton's social, political and religious views proved too different from those of the Board.

In September 1877, Bickerton stood for election to Christchurch City Council and was successful. Together with four other councillors, he resigned a year later in protest over the election of former mayor and convicted fraudster William Wilson.

== Wainoni home ==
In 1884, Bickerton and his family moved into a new home near New Brighton, Christchurch, that he named Wainoni. It became a centre for the social life of students at the Canterbury College. The property included a small theatre, a vast garden, and fireworks displays for entertainment. Bickerton's idea for the property was to create a new form of society based around his socialist beliefs, but this social experiment was discontinued after several years. From 1903 the property became more of a theme park to provide family income. It contained a zoo, an amphitheatre, a conservatory, aquaria, a cinema, and medicine and fireworks factories. Mock naval battles were held on a man-made lake along with fireworks displays. The property attracted hundreds of thousands of visitors over the coming years. In time, the Pleasure Gardens, as they were called, started running at a loss and were closed by 1914.

== Hope for theory recognition ==
In 1910 after significant developments in the astronomy field, Bickerton believed he had another chance to get his partial impact theory recognised. He went to London the same year, leaving his wife and five sons and two daughters in charge of the Wainoni home. Bickerton hoped he could get support from his most famous student Ernest Rutherford who commented on the theory: “the only satisfactory theory of accounting for the remarkable phenomena observed at the time of the appearance of a new star”. Rutherford was not an astronomer and he failed to sway opinion. Bickerton was not able to provide new evidence to explain his theory, and could only repeat what he previously thought. The theory did achieve some recognition by being included in authoritative writings as a possible explanation in the appearance of novae. Some years later Rutherford showed in experiments that third bodies would be produced by atomic impacts resulting in disintegration of one of the atoms. Sometimes close to destitution he never lost hope that his theory would one day be recognised.

== Publications ==
Amongst his published books are:

- The Romance of the Heavens
- The Romance of the Earth
- The Perils of a Pioneer

== Later life and death ==
A year after his first wife died in 1919, Bickerton, then aged 79, married Mary Wilkinson in London, United Kingdom. He died on 21 January 1929 aged 87, holding the title of Professor Emeritus of Canterbury College. His ashes were returned to New Zealand. The Canterbury College Board of Governors decided that a suitably inscribed brass tablet should be placed in the college hall and that the urn containing his ashes would be deposited in the cavity behind the tablet. An unveiling ceremony was held on 24 June 1929.

== Legacy ==
- The suburb Wainoni is now an eastern suburb in Christchurch, New Zealand – taken from the name of Bickerton's home translated from Māori meaning "the bend in the water"
- Bickerton Street in Christchurch was named after him, and is in the location of the original Wainoni Home
- An asteroid found in 1989 is named after him: 4837 Bickerton
