= Charles Gifford (astronomer) =

New Zealand astronomer, explorer, and teacher

Algernon Charles Gifford (18 April 1861 – 27 February 1948) was an astronomer, explorer and teacher.

Gifford was born off the Cape of Good Hope aboard the Zealandia and upon arrival in New Zealand his family settled in Oamaru. In 1880 he became a sizar at St John's College, Cambridge and graduated as 14th wrangler. After Cambridge he returned to New Zealand to teach mathematics and science at Waitaki Boys' High School (1883-1889), Christ's College (1889-1892) and Wellington College (1895-1927). He also helped create an observatory in 1912, which is named the Gifford Observatory in his honour.

In 1901 Gifford married Suzie Jones at Oamaru and had three children.

Near the end of his teaching career Gifford started to contribute regular astronomy articles to the Evening Post, one of Wellington's daily newspapers, which later turned into an influential column. His columns were later reprinted as booklets in 14 volumes under the name In Starry Skies, and eventually combined to form an introductory textbook.

Through meeting Alexander Bickerton he became a supporter of Bickerton's Partial impact theory and enthusiastically explored and polished the theory.

He was an apt mathematician, and one of the first people to provide evidence that craters on the Moon are the result of meteorite impact. Publications of his mathematically justified theories in 1924 and 1930 contributed to the theory, which was later confirmed. Before this time, it had been popularly believed that craters on the Moon were caused by volcanic activity.

Although best known for his enthusiastic promotion of astronomy in New Zealand, including the establishment of the observatory in his name, he was also a respected explorer. Charles Gifford was one of the early photographic documenters of much of the back country within New Zealand's South Island. In 1939, Mount Gifford on South Island was named in his honour.
