= John Giffard =

John Giffard may refer to:

- John Giffard, 1st Baron Giffard (1232–1299), English nobleman
- John Giffard (died 1556) (c. 1465–1556), Tudor courtier, soldier, MP and landowner, of Chillington Hall, Staffordshire
- John Giffard (died 1613) (1534–1613), landowner, MP and noted Elizabethan recusant, of Chillington Hall
- John Giffard (1602–1665), colonel, Civil War commander, of Brightley, Devon
- John Giffard, 3rd Earl of Halsbury (1908–2000), British peer and scientist
- John Giffard (MP for Gloucestershire), 14th century, see Gloucestershire
- John Giffard (MP for Buckinghamshire) (died c. 1436), MP for Buckinghamshire, see Knights of Buckinghamshire
- John Giffard (judge), 14th-century English-born lawyer and cleric in Ireland
- John Giffard (police officer) (born 1951/2), British police officer, former chief constable of Staffordshire Police

== See also ==
- John Gifford (disambiguation)
- Giffard (disambiguation)
