= Odesa City Hall =

Building in Odesa, Ukraine

Coordinates: 46°29′8.26″N 30°44′38.22″E

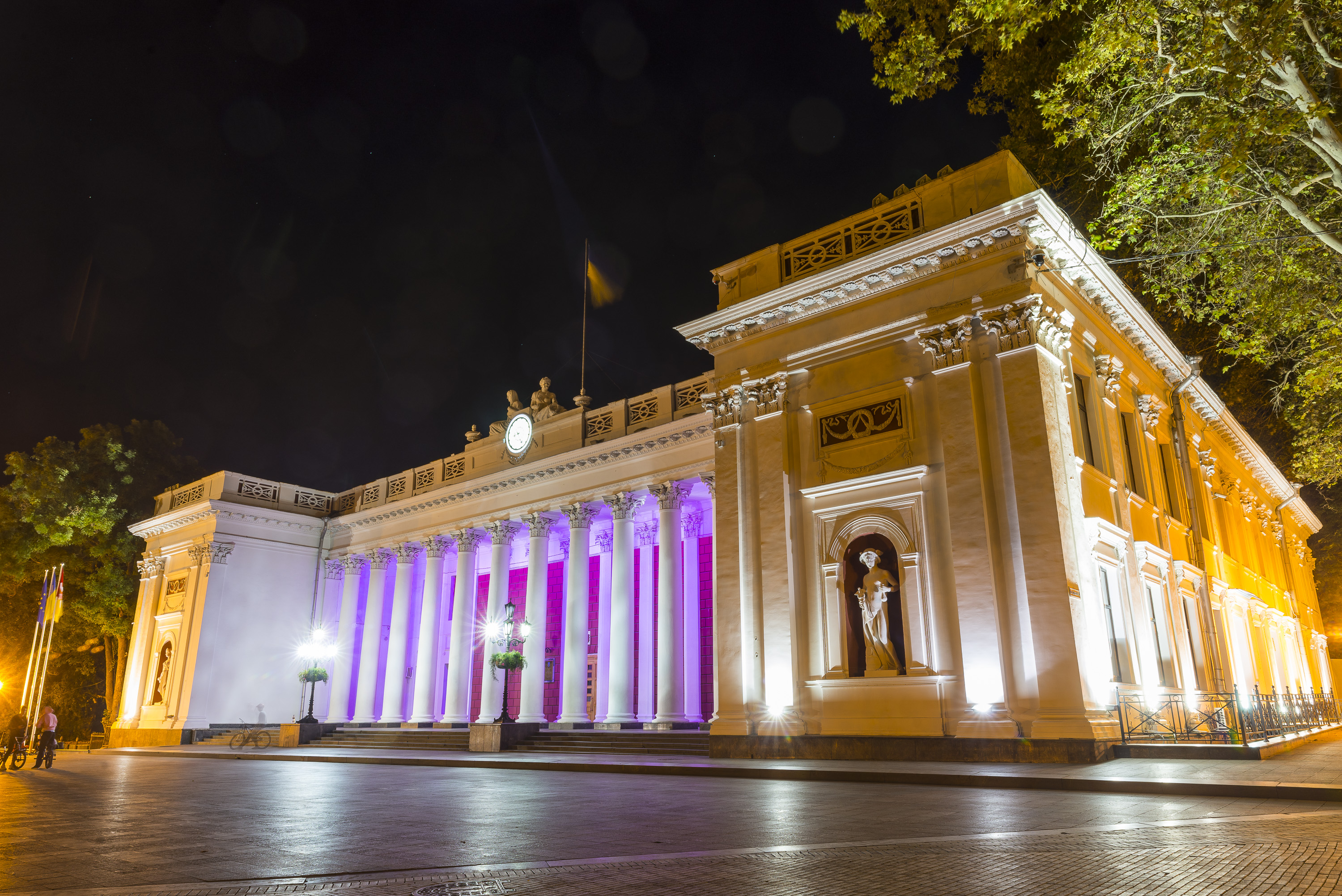
Odesa City Hall

Odesa City Hall (Ukrainian: Будинок Одеської міської ради) is the city hall of Odesa, Ukraine, located at the junction of Prymorskyi Boulevard, Teatralnyi Lane and Italiiska Street. It occupies a Neoclassical building, built to a design by Francesco Boffo and Gregorio Toricelli in 1828–34. Rebuilt in 1871-1873 by Franz Morandi.

== Description ==
The frontage features two large statues depicting Ceres and Mercury in their roles as the goddess of agriculture and the god of trade respectively, marking the building's original purpose as an Exchange. Ceres and Mercury designed by sculptor Luigi Iorini. Sculptures of Greek gods appeared on the building later. Initially, on both sides of the entrance to the niches were sculptures of a lion and a bear made by Joseph and Peter Genari.

Every half-hour, the clock above the entrance chimes the melody "Odesa my town" (the same tune greeting incoming trains at the Odesa Train Station). This is from the operetta White Acacia by the Soviet composer Isaak Dunayevsky.

In front of the building is a small square called "Dumska", containing a monument to Alexander Pushkin who spent 13 months in Odesa, and a Naval artillery recovered from the British frigate HMS Tiger, that grounded and was sunk near the town during the Crimean War.

== Storm of the Odesa City Hall ==
On 21 December 2012 fighting occurred at the doors of the Odesa City Hall. Three members of law enforcement were reported to have been hospitalized with minor injuries. The city mayor Oleksiy Kostusyev in his official announcement that fighters from Svoboda equipped with non-firing weapons engaged in a fight with the building security and tried to disrupt work of the Odesa City Council. Kostusyev also used term fashistvuyushchie (a new invented term meaning fascists that cause havoc) and called the people "not quite vanished successors of fascism". The mayor explained the reasons for those actions were intentions to prevent renaming a city street after the Soviet Army. He also claimed that his announcement was supported unanimously by all council members.

According to the official press release of Svoboda, the protest event took place after one of the members of the Odesa City Council was not allowed to participate in a session. In the statement Svoboda claimed that the member of council had the intention to address the session of council in regards to recent events connected with local markets and role of the city authorities in city life. Supposedly there is a supporting document adopted by the council about not allowing the particular member of council to participate in its sessions. The region prosecutor's office was scheduled to conduct an investigation.

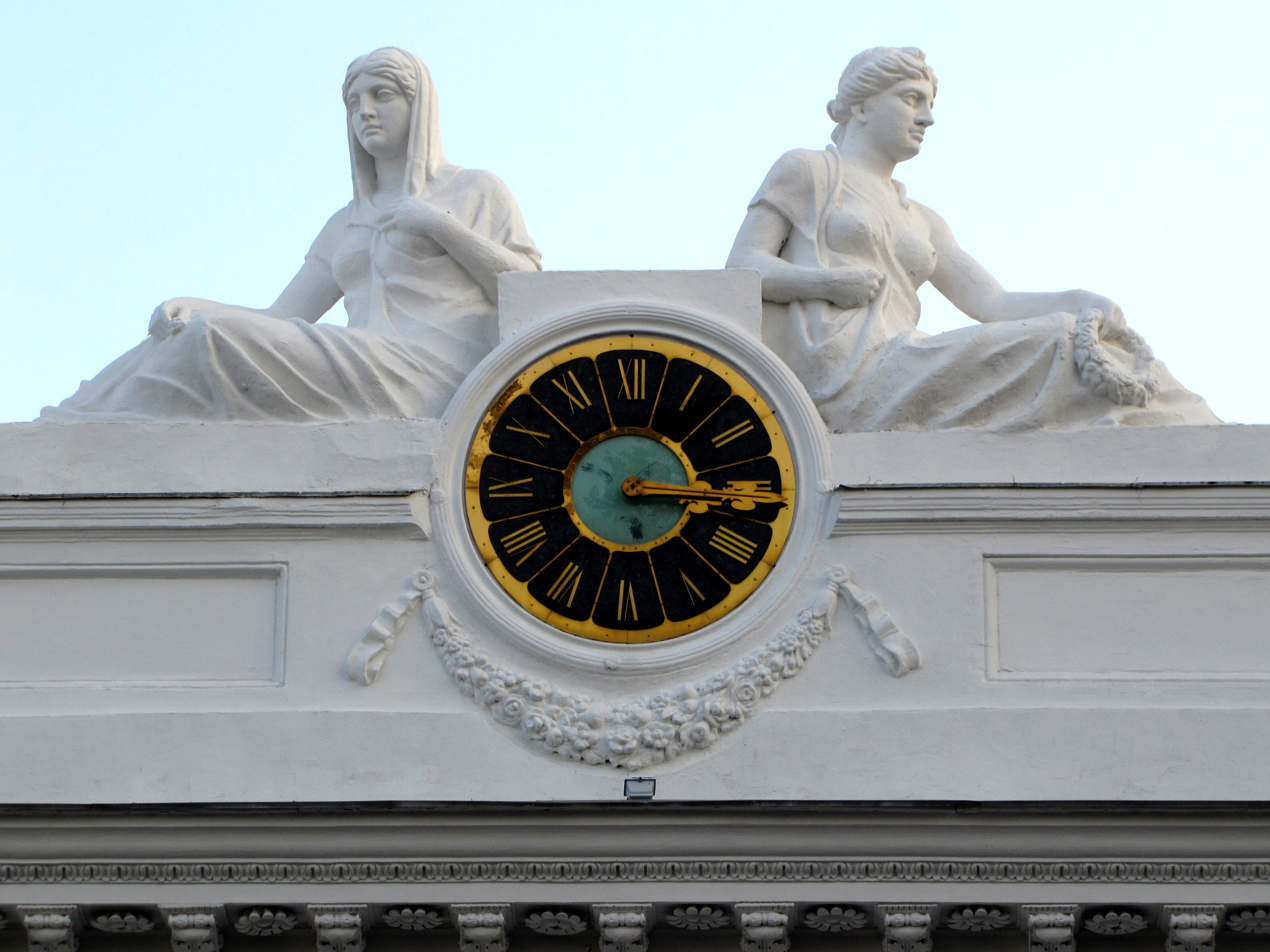
Clock

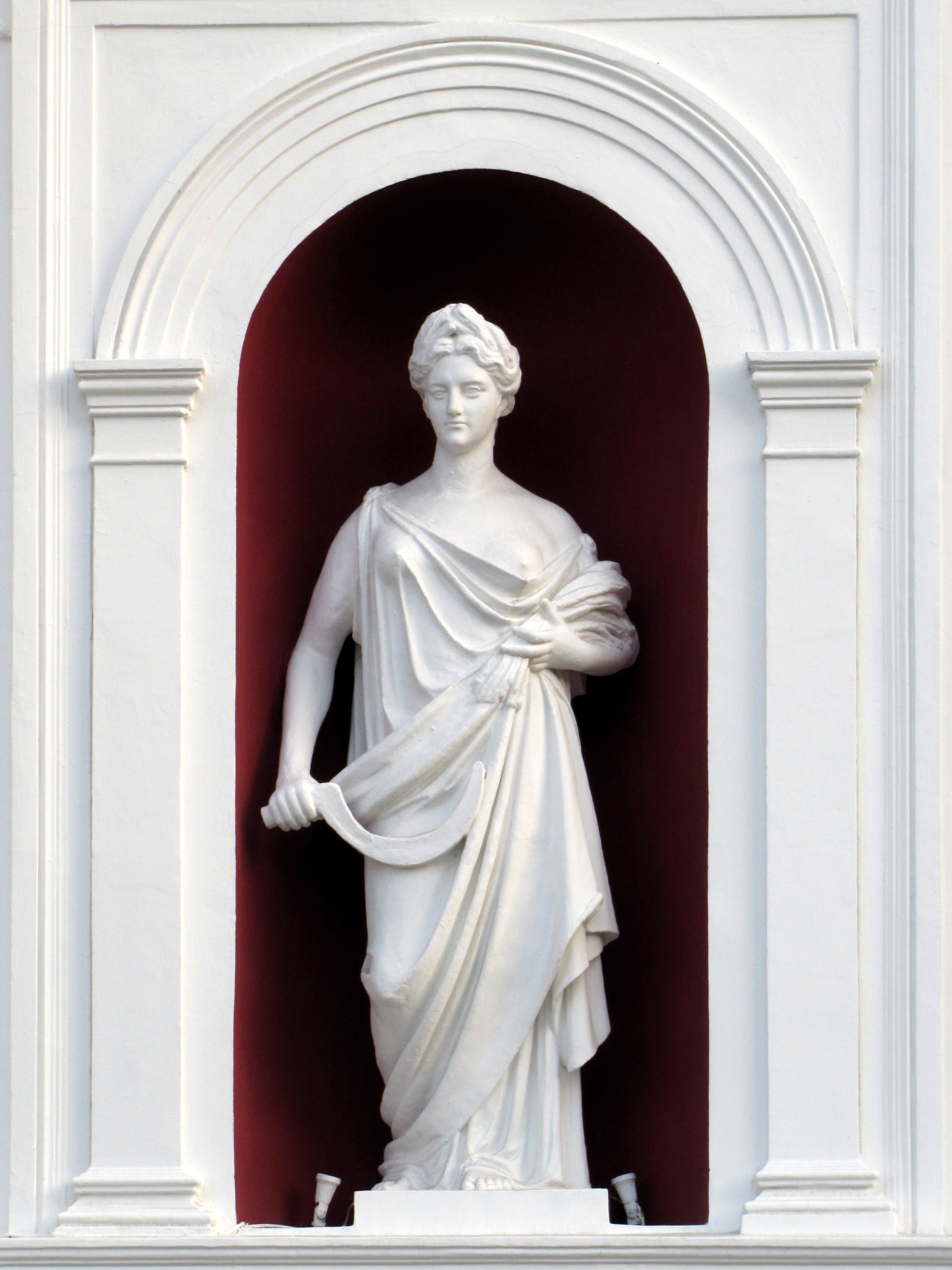
Ceres

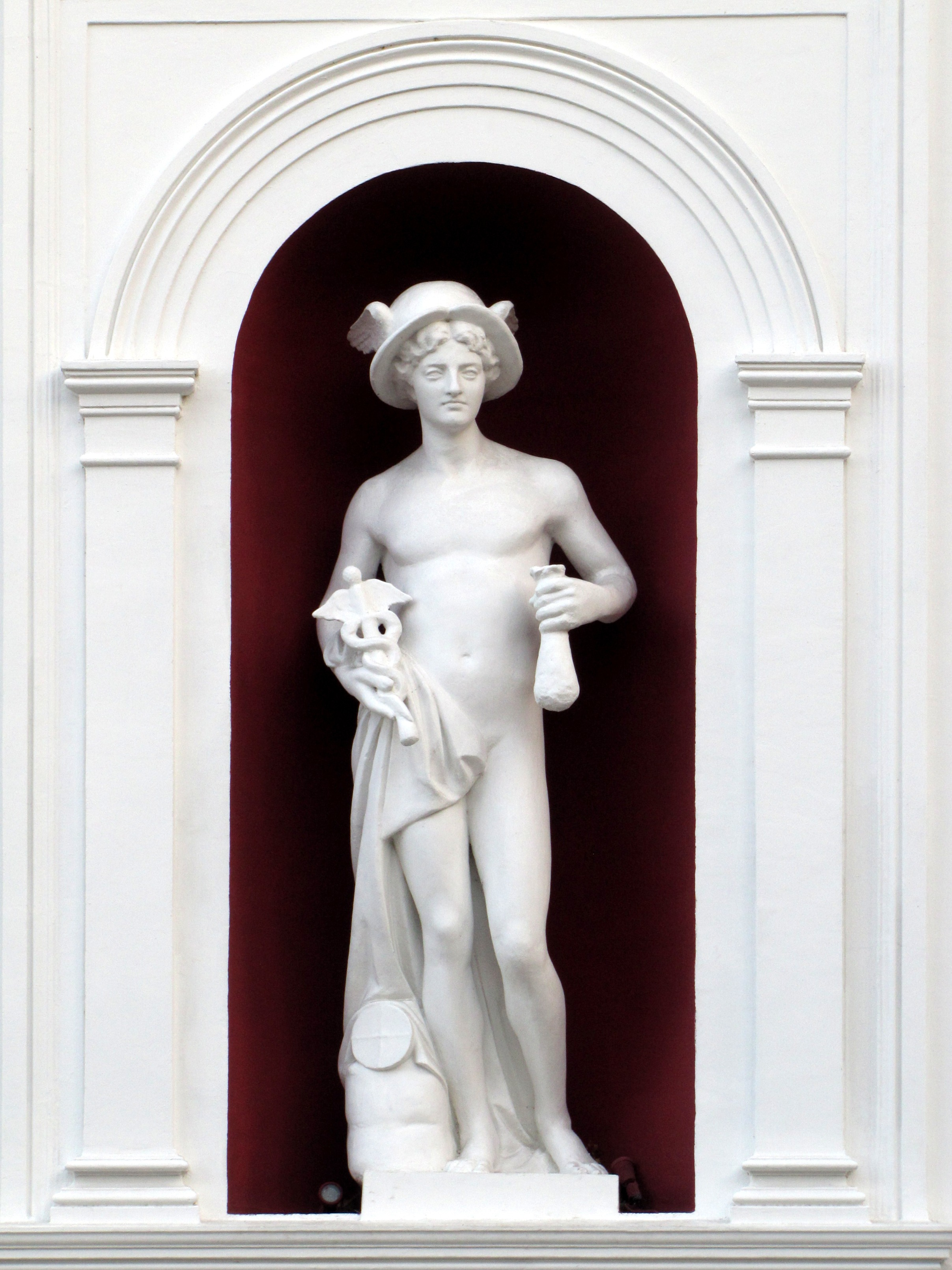
Mercury
