= Penfield, Illinois =

Penfield
- Census-designated place
- Location within Illinois
- Coordinates: 40°18′17″N 87°56′40″W
- Country: United States
- State: Illinois
- County: Champaign
- Township: Compromise

Area
  - Total: 0.26 sq mi (0.67 km^{2})
  - Land: 0.26 sq mi (0.67 km^{2})
  - Water: 0 sq mi (0.00 km^{2})
- Elevation: 705 ft (215 m)

Population (2020)
  - Total: 151
  - Density: 587.0/sq mi (226.63/km^{2})
- Time zone: UTC-6 (CST)
  - Summer (DST): UTC-5 (CDT)
- ZIP code: 61862
- Area code: 217
- FIPS code: 17-58577
- GNIS feature ID: 2628559

Penfield is an unincorporated census-designated place in Compromise Township, Champaign County, Illinois, United States. Its population was 151 at the 2020 census.

== History ==
Penfield was laid out in 1876 and is named after John Penfield of Rantoul, Illinois. It had a station on the now-defunct Illinois Central Railroad along with nearby Gifford.

== Geography ==
According to the 2021 census gazetteer files, Penfield has a total area of 0.26 square miles (0.67 km^{2}), all land.

== Demographics ==
Historical population
Census	Pop.	Note	%±
2010	193		—
2020	151		−21.8%
U.S. Decennial Census

As of the 2020 census, 151 people, 104 households, and 57 families reside in the CDP. The population density was 587.55 inhabitants per square mile (226.85/km^{2}). There were 74 housing units at an average density of 287.94 per square mile (111.17/km^{2}). The racial makeup of the CDP was 90.07% White, 1.32% from other races, and 8.61% from two or more races. Hispanic or Latino of any race were 2.65% of the population.

There were 104 households, of which 14.4% had children under 18 living with them, 51.92% were married couples living together, 0.00% had a female householder with no husband present, and 45.19% were non-families. 23.08% of all households comprised individuals, and 16.35% had someone 65 years or older living alone. The average household size was 2.05, and the average family size was 2.26.

The CDP's age distribution consisted of 21.3% under 18, 4.3% from 18 to 24, 18.7% from 25 to 44, 14.5% from 45 to 64, and 41.3% who were 65 years or older. The median age was 48.0 years. For every 100 females, there were 108.0 males. For every 100 females age 18 and over, there were 103.3 males.

The median income for a household in the CDP was $76,250, and the median income for a family was $118,164. Males had a median income of $48,750 versus $31,136 for females. The per capita income for the CDP was $33,539. The number of families and 7.2% of the population were below the poverty line, including none of those under age 18 and none of those age 65 or over.

== Education ==
It is in the Gifford Community Consolidated School District 188 and the Armstrong Township High School District 225.

== Bibliography ==
- Stewart, J.R., ed. (1918). A Standard History of Champaign County Illinois. Vol. I. Chicago and New York: The Lewis Publishing Company. LCCN 20003364.
