= John C. Gifford Arboretum =

Arboretum and botanical garden in Coral Gables, Florida

Coordinates: 25°43′25.54″N 80°16′49.26″W

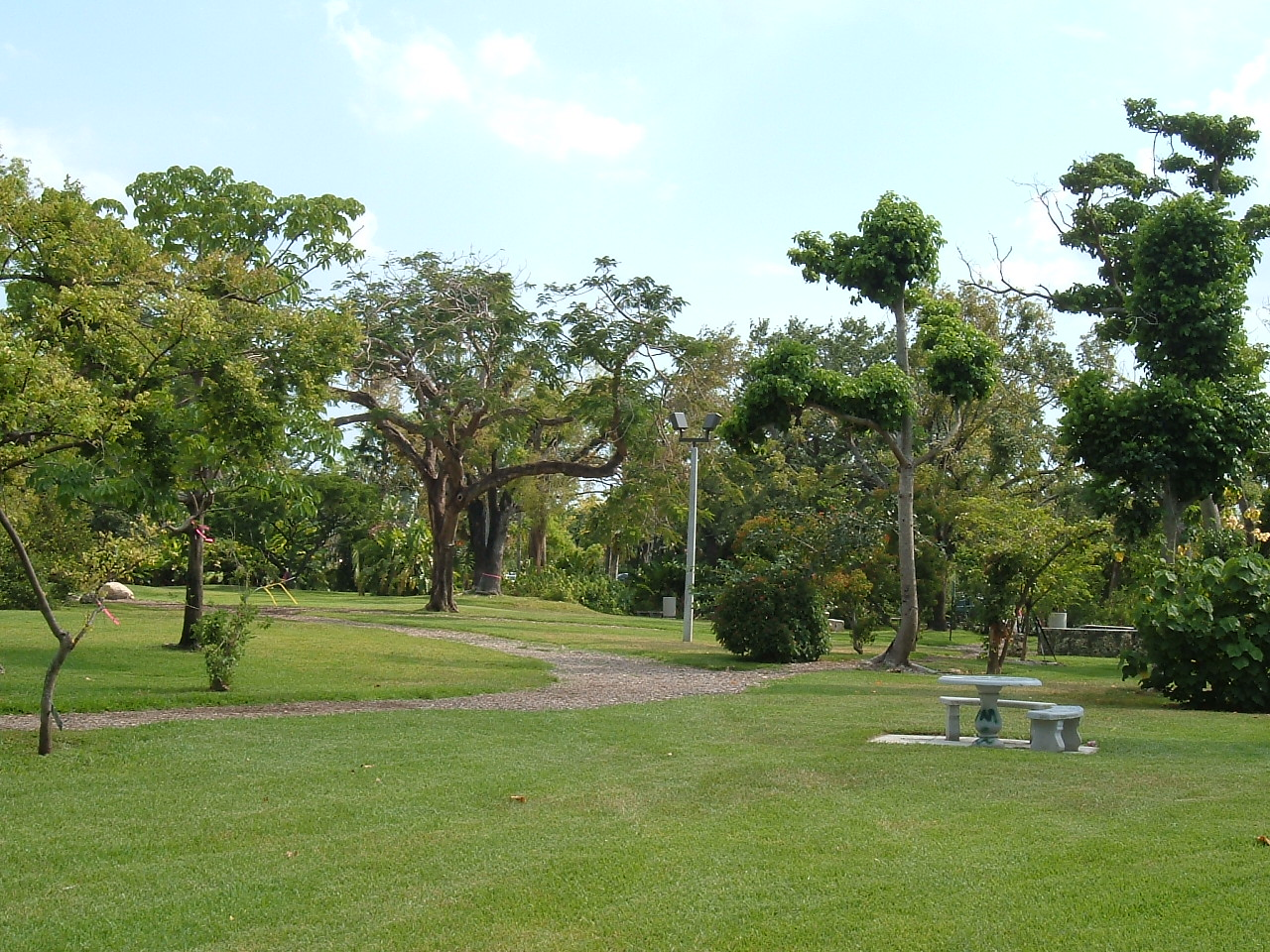
The John C. Gifford Arboretum on the campus of the University of Miami in Coral Gables, Florida, May 2006

The John C. Gifford Arboretum is an arboretum and botanical garden located on the campus of the University of Miami in Coral Gables, Florida.

== History ==
The arboretum was founded in 1947 Frank J. Rimoldi and Roy Woodbury. In 1949, it was named for University of Miami professor John Clayton Gifford, an expert on tropical woods and professor of tropical forestry at the University of Miami. In 1950, the Gifford Society of Tropical Botany was formed to promote study of tropical plants, and the arboretum grew to more than 500 plants. Roberta ‘Bosey’ Fulbright Foote, wife of University of Miami president Edward T. Foote II, was a strong supporter of the arboretum.

The garden is divided into several exhibits, including one dedicated to the plants domesticated by the Mayans.

== Development and preservation ==
Coral Gables resident Kathryn Gaubatz has been an active force in working to preserve and protect the John C. Gifford Arboretum from future development. In 2005, the Coral Gables City Commission voted to approve the construction of a road within the Coral Gables campus to ease traffic off of San Amaro Drive, US 1, and Granada Boulevard, the three main streets that encircle the 260-acre (1.1 km^{2}) campus and therefore handle the vast majority of vehicular traffic coming and leaving from the University of Miami.

== Access ==
The University of Miami campus is served by Miami Metrorail at University Station.
