= Mount Gifford =

Mountain in Fiordland, New Zealand

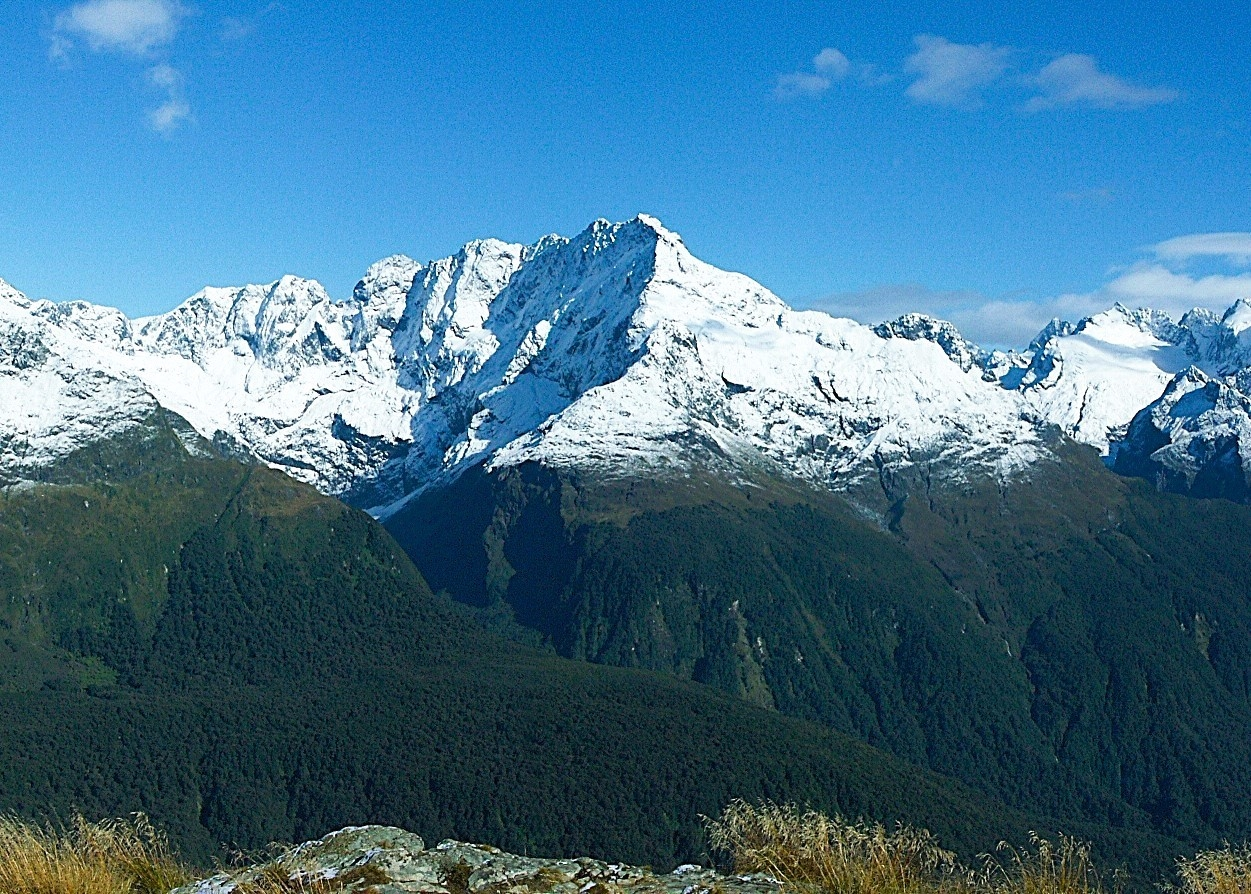
- East aspect

Highest point
- Elevation: 2,149 m (7,051 ft)
- Prominence: 349 m (1,145 ft)
- Isolation: 3.08 km (1.91 mi)
- Coordinates: 44°43′30″S 168°04′33″E

Naming
- Etymology: Algernon Charles Gifford

Geography
- Location within New Zealand
- Interactive map of Mount Gifford
- Location: South Island
- Country: New Zealand
- Region: Southland
- Protected area: Fiordland National Park
- Parent range: Darran Mountains
- Topo map: Topo50 CB09

Geology
- Rock age: 136 ± 1.9 Ma
- Rock type(s): Gabbronorite, dioritic orthogneiss

Climbing
- First ascent: 1955
- Easiest route: North East Ridge

Mount Gifford is a 2,149-metre-elevation (7,051-foot) mountain in Fiordland, New Zealand.

== Description ==
Mount Gifford is part of the Darran Mountains, and is situated in the Southland Region of the South Island. It is set within Fiordland National Park which is part of the Te Wahipounamu UNESCO World Heritage Site. Precipitation runoff from the mountain drains to the Hollyford River via Moraine Creek and Caples Creek. Topographic relief is significant as the summit rises 2,050 metres (6,726 feet) above the Hollyford Valley in three kilometres and 1,250 metres (4,101 feet) above Caples Creek in one kilometre.

== History ==
The mountain was named in 1939 by Dr. L. Stewart to honour Algernon Charles Gifford (1861–1948), an astronomer, explorer and teacher. The toponym has been officially approved by the New Zealand Geographic Board. The first ascent of the summit was made in October 1955 by Alistair McDonald and Ken Hamilton via the North East Ridge.

== Climate ==
Based on the Köppen climate classification, Mount Gifford is located in a marine west coast climate zone. Prevailing westerly winds blow moist air from the Tasman Sea onto the mountain, where the air is forced upward by the mountains (orographic lift), causing moisture to drop in the form of rain and snow. The months of December through February offer the most favourable weather for viewing or climbing this peak.

== See also ==
- List of mountains of New Zealand by height
- Fiordland

== Gallery ==
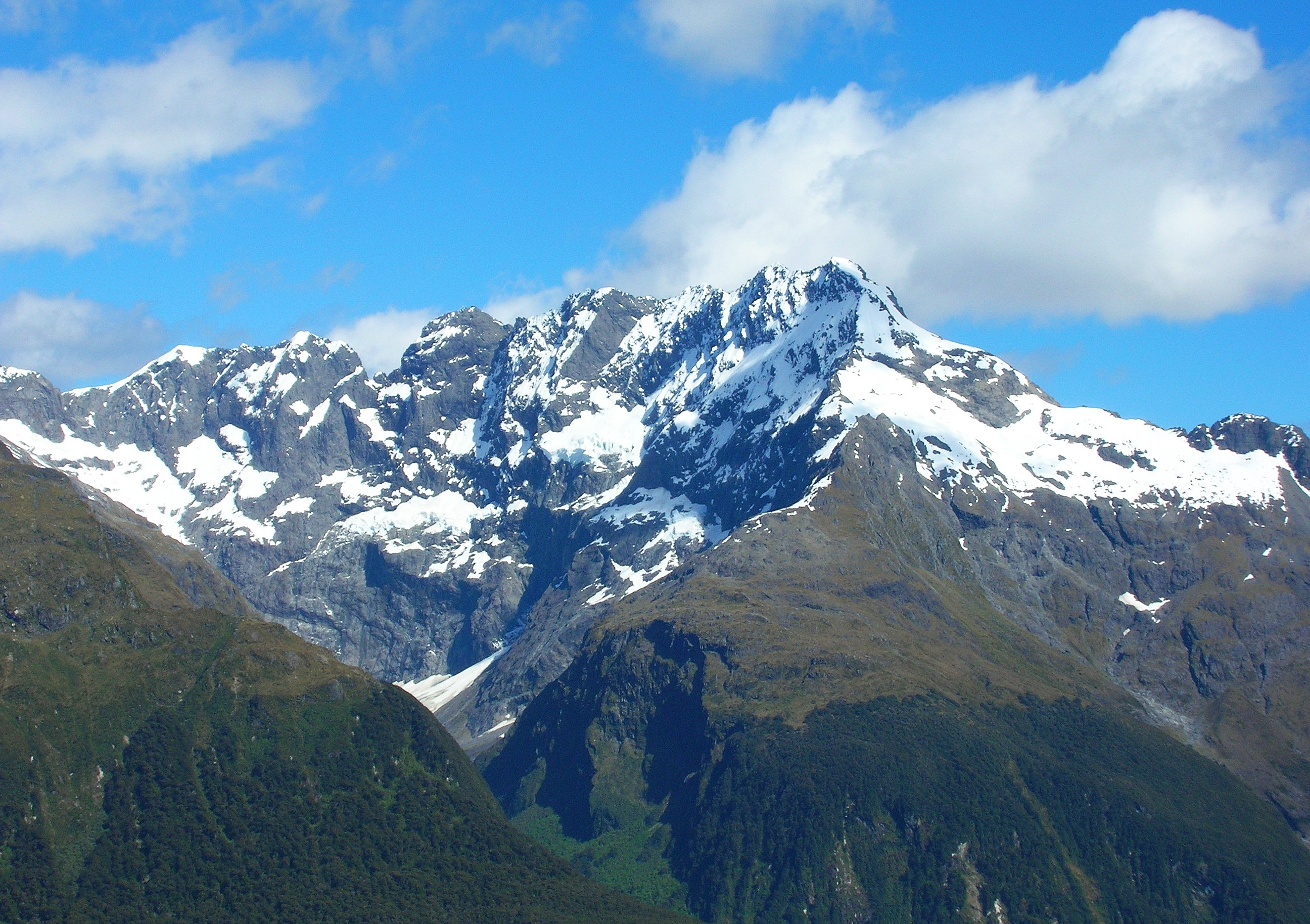
Mount Gifford from Routeburn Track

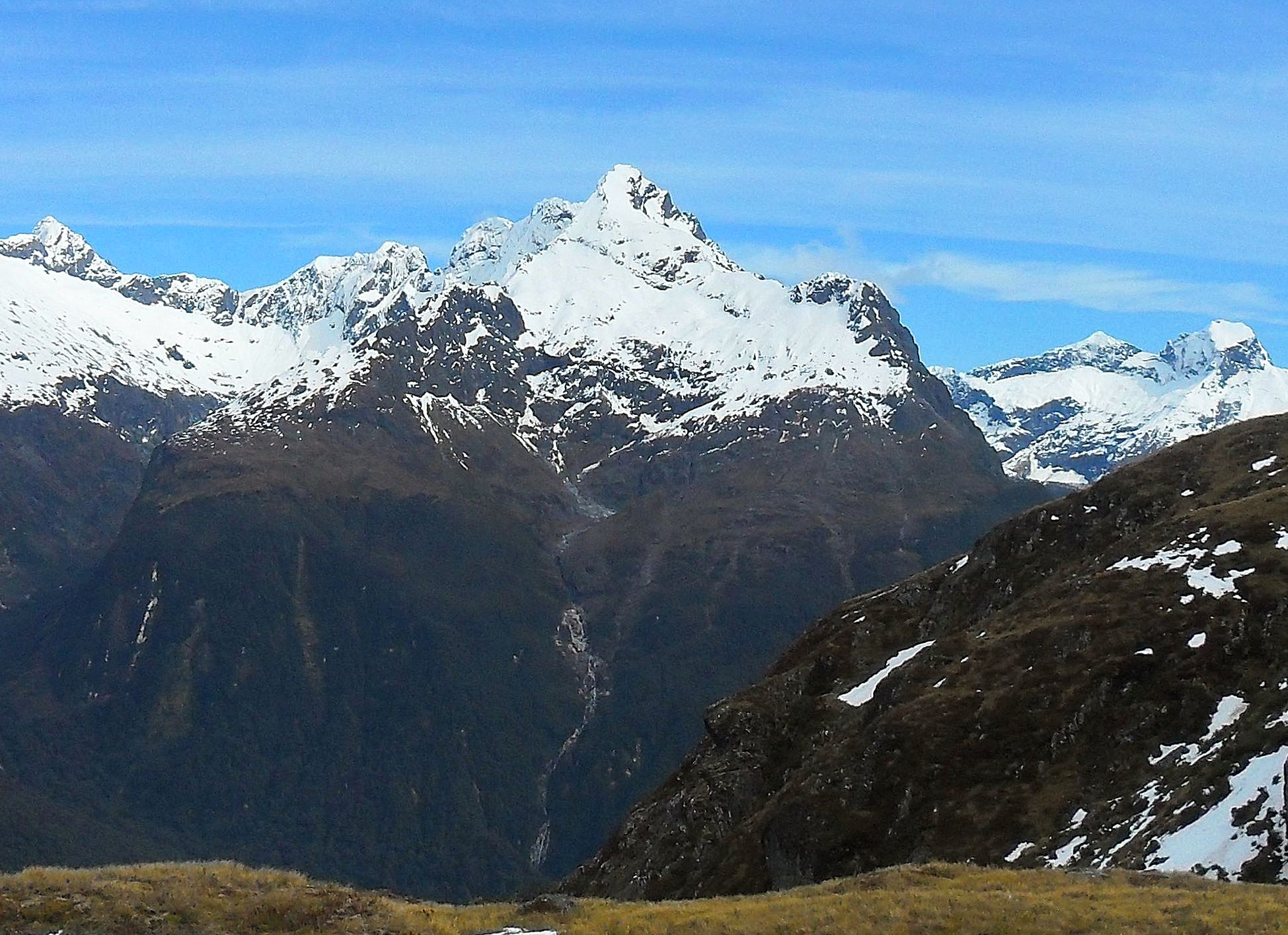
Mount Gifford from Routeburn Track
