= James Gifford (Royal Navy officer) =

British Royal Navy rear admiral

Rear-Admiral James Gifford
- Born: 20 November 1768; Halifax, Nova Scotia
- Died: 20 August 1853 (aged 84)
- Occupation: Royal Navy Rear-Admiral

James Gifford the younger (20 November 1768 – 20 August 1853) was a British Royal Navy rear admiral.

== Biography ==
Gifford was born at Halifax, Nova Scotia, on 20 November 1768. He was the son of James Gifford the elder. Having entered the navy in 1783, he served under the broad pennant of Sir Charles Douglas on the Halifax station. He afterwards served in the West Indies, Channel and Mediterranean, and during the occupation of Toulon, in the St. George flagship of Rear-admiral John Gell. In October 1793 he was promoted to be lieutenant, and shortly afterwards was appointed to the Lutine frigate, with Captain James Macnamara, in which he narrowly escaped capture by the French squadron under M. Richery, off Cadiz, on 7 October 1795. After serving in the Pompée with Captain Vashon, and the Prince and Prince George, flagships of Sir Charles Cotton, he was promoted to be commander on 7 May 1802. For a short time in 1803 he was acting captain of the Braave frigate; in 1804 was appointed to the command of the Speedy brig, which formed part of the squadron employed off Boulogne and Calais during that and the succeeding year. In 1808 he was appointed to the Sarpen, for service in the Baltic and North Sea, and in February 1812 to the Sheldrake, from which, on 12 August, he was advanced to post-rank. He had no further service afloat, and, following his father's example, devoted himself from this time to religious studies and labours in the cause of unitarianism. After the death of his father (1813), he seems to have lived for some time at Swansea, where he wrote ‘Remonstrance of a Unitarian, addressed to [Burgess] the Bishop of St. Davids’ (8vo, 1818), which won him a high place in the esteem of his brother sectarians, and quickly ran into a second edition (1820). Replies to this remonstrance were entitled ‘Unitarianism indefensible. A letter … to … James Gifford [by J. Garbett],’ London, 1818, 8vo, and ‘An Examination of the Remonstrance addressed to the Bishop of St. David's, with Answers to the Questions addressed to Trinitarians generally,’ London, 1822, 8vo. Gifford afterwards moved with his sister and mother to Jersey, where he lived in a very modest way, devoting the greater part of his small income to works of benevolence, and to furthering the cause of unitarianism. In 1845 he published as a pamphlet ‘Letter of a Unitarian to the Rev. S. Langston, minister of St. James's Church, Jersey;’ but his principal work lay in the silent and unpretending but effective devotion to the cause with which he had associated himself. In 1846 he became a rear-admiral on the retired list, but the promotion made no change in his life, beyond increasing his income and his ability to give. He was not married, and died at Mont Orgueil Cottage, near St. Helier, on 20 August 1853. His mother had already died, at the age of 94, in 1840; his sister, Juliana Elizabeth, who had lived with him, survived him a few years, and died 19 April 1858, aged 84.
