= Henry Wells Giffard =

British Royal Navy captain

Captain Henry Wells Giffard
- Born: 1810
- Died: 1 June 1854 (aged 43–44)
- Occupation: Royal Navy captain

Henry Wells Giffard (1810 – 1 June 1854) was a British Royal Navy captain.

== Biography ==
Giffard was the son of Admiral John Giffard (d. 1851). He entered the navy in 1824; was a midshipman of the Asia at the Battle of Navarino, 20 October 1827; was promoted to the rank of lieutenant on 4 March 1831; and after serving in the Mediterranean and on the East Indian station was made commander on 22 February 1838. In 1839 he commissioned the Cruiser of 16 guns, in which he went out to China and took part in the capture of Chusan and Canton. He was advanced to post-rank on 8 June 1841; but continuing in command of the Cruiser, was present at the reduction of Amoy and Chinghae. He returned to England in 1842, and in 1846–7 was captain of the Penelope, bearing the Broad pennant of Sir Charles Hotham, on the coast of Africa.

In June 1852 he was appointed to the Tiger, paddle-wheel frigate, for service in the Mediterranean, and in 1854 attached to the fleet in the Black Sea. On 11 May the Tiger, in company with two other steamers, was detached from the fleet off Sebastopol, and early on the following morning in a dense fog took the ground close under a cliff a little to the south of Odessa. As soon as she was discovered from the shore, the Russians brought up a battery of field-pieces, and from the edge of the cliff opened a plunging fire of shot, shell, and carcasses, to which the Tiger's guns were unable to reply. The ship was soon set on fire, shell and shrapnel were sweeping her decks, resistance was impossible, and Giffard, severely wounded in the leg, was carried down to the surgeon. Under these circumstances he ordered the ship to be surrendered, and the officers and men, becoming prisoners of war, were hastily sent ashore; Giffard, whose leg had just been amputated, being passed into a boat through a maindeck port. Every care and attention seems to have been shown to the wounded, but the shock to Giffard's system, added to the anxiety and depression of spirits, proved fatal, and he died on 1 June. ‘He died as he lived, a religious man, much regretted by all,’ is the comment of one of the Tiger's officers. He was buried at Odessa with military honours.

Giffard married, in 1846, Ella Emilia, daughter of Major-general Sir Benjamin C. Stephenson, G.C.H., and left issue, among others, Vice-admiral George Augustus Giffard, C.M.G. (b. 1849), who, as a lieutenant of the Alert, served in the Arctic expedition of 1875–6.
