= George Gifford (cricketer) =

English cricketer

George Cooper Gifford was an English cricketer who played for Northamptonshire from 1923 to 1929. He was born in Huntingdon on 17 November 1891 and died there on 16 September 1972. He appeared in fourteen first-class matches as a right-handed batsman who scored 387 runs with a highest score of 98.
