= John Clayton Gifford =

The Everglades and other essays related to southern Florida, a 1911 book by Gifford

John Clayton Gifford (February 8, 1870 – June 25, 1949) was a naturalist and forester who was the first American to hold a PhD in forestry.

== Early life and education ==
Born in 1870 in the Mays Landing, New Jersey, he received a BSc in 1890 from Swarthmore College and later studied forestry in Germany. He worked as an associate professor at Cornell University.

== Career ==
In 1902, he moved to the Coconut Grove neighborhood in Miami, where he became an entrepreneur and land developer. He was an ardent supporter of draining the Everglades and started experimenting by planting Cajeput trees.

He wrote articles for the Miami Herald's Tropic magazine. He wrote The Everglades and other essays relating to southern Florida (1911).

He introduced Melaleuca trees to Florida in the 1900s. Melaleuca quinquenervia subsequently invaded large areas of South Florida, displacing native wetland and upland vegetation.

He later was employed at the University of Miami as a Professor of tropical forestry.

The John C. Gifford Arboretum at the University of Miami was named for him in 1949. It was established in 1947 and currently has collection of over 500 plants.

== Writings ==
- Notes collected during a visit to the forests of Holland, Germany, Switzerland, and France. By John Gifford. From the Annual report of the State Geologist for 1896
- The forestal conditions and silvicultural prospects of the coastal plain of New Jersey, with remarks in reference to other regions and kindred subjects (1900)
- The Luquillo Forest Reserve, Porto Rico (1905)
- On Preserving Tropical Florida compiled by Elizabeth Ogren Rothra
- Practical forestry for beginners in forestry agricultural students woodland owners and others desiring a general knowledge of the nature of the art (1912)
- The Tropical Subsistence Homestead
- The Keys and Glades of South Florida: The Rehabilitation of the Floridan Keys; The Reclamation of the Everglades with Trees
