= James Gifford the elder =

British Army officer and Unitarian writer

James Gifford, the elder (c. 1739–1813) was a British Army officer and Unitarian writer.

== Life ==
The son of James Gifford, mayor of Cambridge in 1757, was born at Cambridge and baptised there on 19 December 1739. Educated at Rugby School, he entered the British Army at 18. Later, a captain of the 14th Foot, he served in Canada at the beginning of the American Revolutionary War.

After giving up his commission, Gifford retired around 1788 to Girton, outside Cambridge. In theology he was a follower of John Jebb. His controversial writing brought him into friendly relations with George Dyer, William Frend and Theophilus Lindsey. Money was left to him by Elizabeth Rayner, who died in 1800, a patron of the Unitarians.

Gifford died at Girton on 21 January 1813, aged 73. He was buried in All Saints' Church, Cambridge, where there was a monument to his memory and that of his parents.

== Works ==
Gifford published:

- A Short Essay on the Belief of an Universal Providence, Cambridge, 1781.
- An Elucidation of the Unity of God, deduced from Scripture and Reason, Cambridge, 1783; 5th edit., 1815 (edited by his son William).
- A Letter to the Archbishop of Canterbury, 1785 (dated 27 January); 3rd edit., 1815, printed as appendix to 5th edit. of the Elucidation No. 2.

== Family ==
Gifford married, in Boston, Massachusetts, Elizabeth Cremer, a native of Bury St Edmunds, who died at St Helier, Jersey, on 16 April 1840, aged 94. Among their children were:

- James Gifford the younger;
- William, major-general in the army, who died at Swansea on 9 August 1825, aged 55;
- Juliana Elizabeth, friend of Richard Cobden, who died at St Helier on 19 April 1858, aged 84;
- George, captain in the army;
- Lucius Henry, sixth son, lieutenant R.N., who died 21 September 1812, aged 29;
- Theophilus John, seventh son, lieutenant in the army, who died 14 March 1811, aged 23.
