= HMS Furious (1850) =

Frigate of the Royal Navy

History

United Kingdom
- Name: HMS Furious
- Ordered: 25 April 1847
- Builder: Portsmouth Dockyard/ Miller & Ravenhill
- Laid down: June 1848
- Launched: 26 August 1850
- Commissioned: 18 February 1853
- Out of service: Became a coal hulk at Portsmouth, March 1867
- Fate: Sold for breaking up 1884

General characteristics
- Class & type: Furious-class frigate
- Tons burthen: 1,287 tons
- Length: 206 ft (63 m)
- Beam: 36 ft 6 in (11.13 m)
- Propulsion: 2-cylinder oscillating engines; paddle wheels; 400 nhp; sails
- Complement: 175
- Armament: 16 guns: 10 x 32pdr guns (Middle deck) 2 x 10in guns on pivots (Upper deck) 4 x 32pdr guns (Upper deck)

HMS Furious was a 16 gun steam powered paddle wheel frigate of the Royal Navy built at Portsmouth Dockyard and launched on 26 August 1850. She was the lead ship of the two ship class of Furious-class frigate. She was built at a cost of £64,794, of which her machinery cost £24,577.

On 29 October 1853, Furious struck a submerged rock in the Dardanelles 20 nautical miles (37 km) from Gallipoli, Ottoman Empire and was damaged. Consequently, Admiral Dundas transferred his flag to HMS Tiger. On 15 April 1854, she sank the corvette Andromache at Odessa after coming under fire from shore-based artillery.

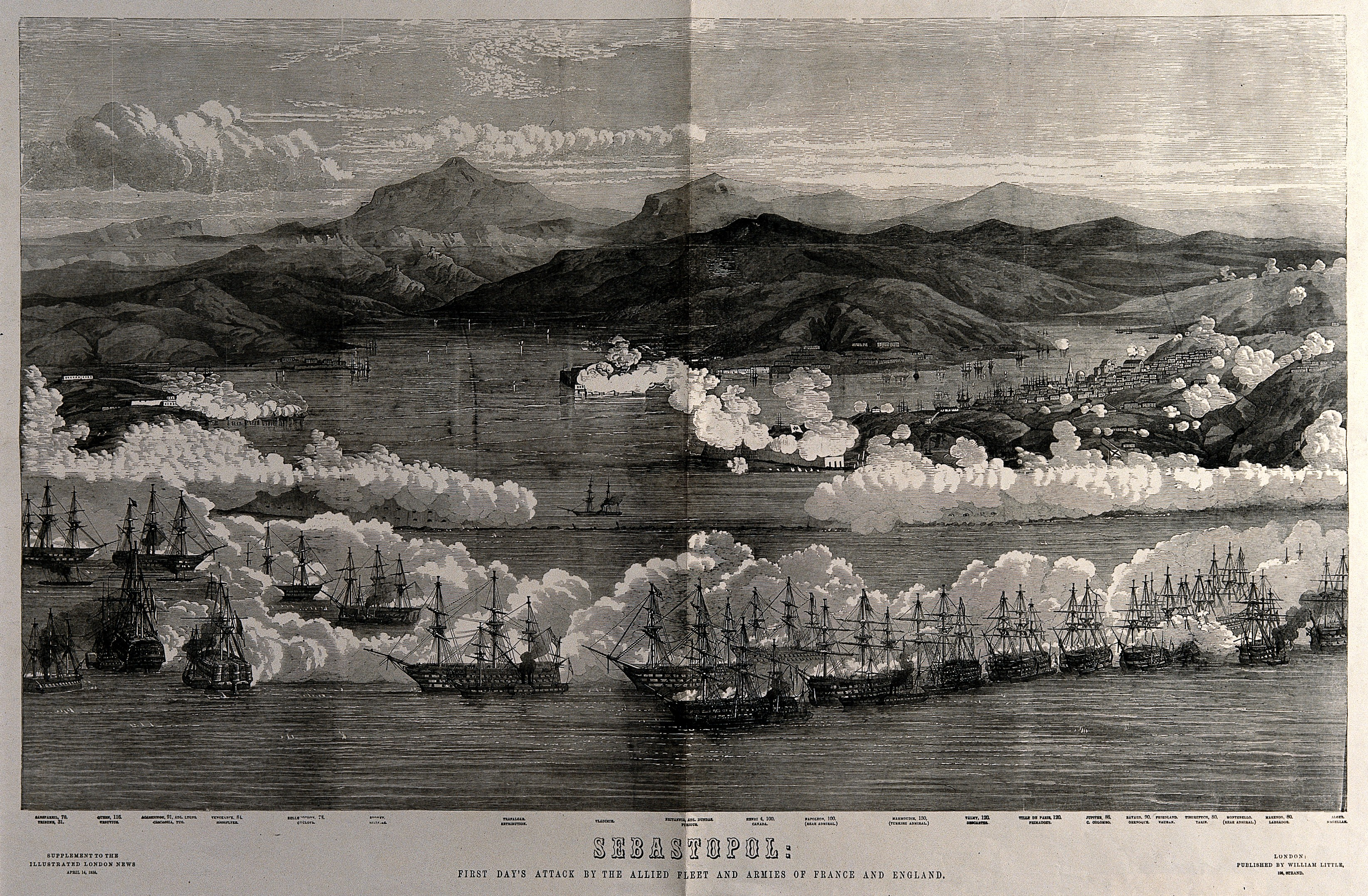
Furious at Sebastopol, during the first day's attack by the allied fleet and armies of France and England on 17 October 1854

Furious was sent with 14 gunboats as reinforcements to the China squadron in 1857.

She became a coal hulk at Portsmouth in March 1867 and was sold for breaking up in 1884 to Castle, of Charlton.
