= HMS Tiger (1849) =

British naval ship

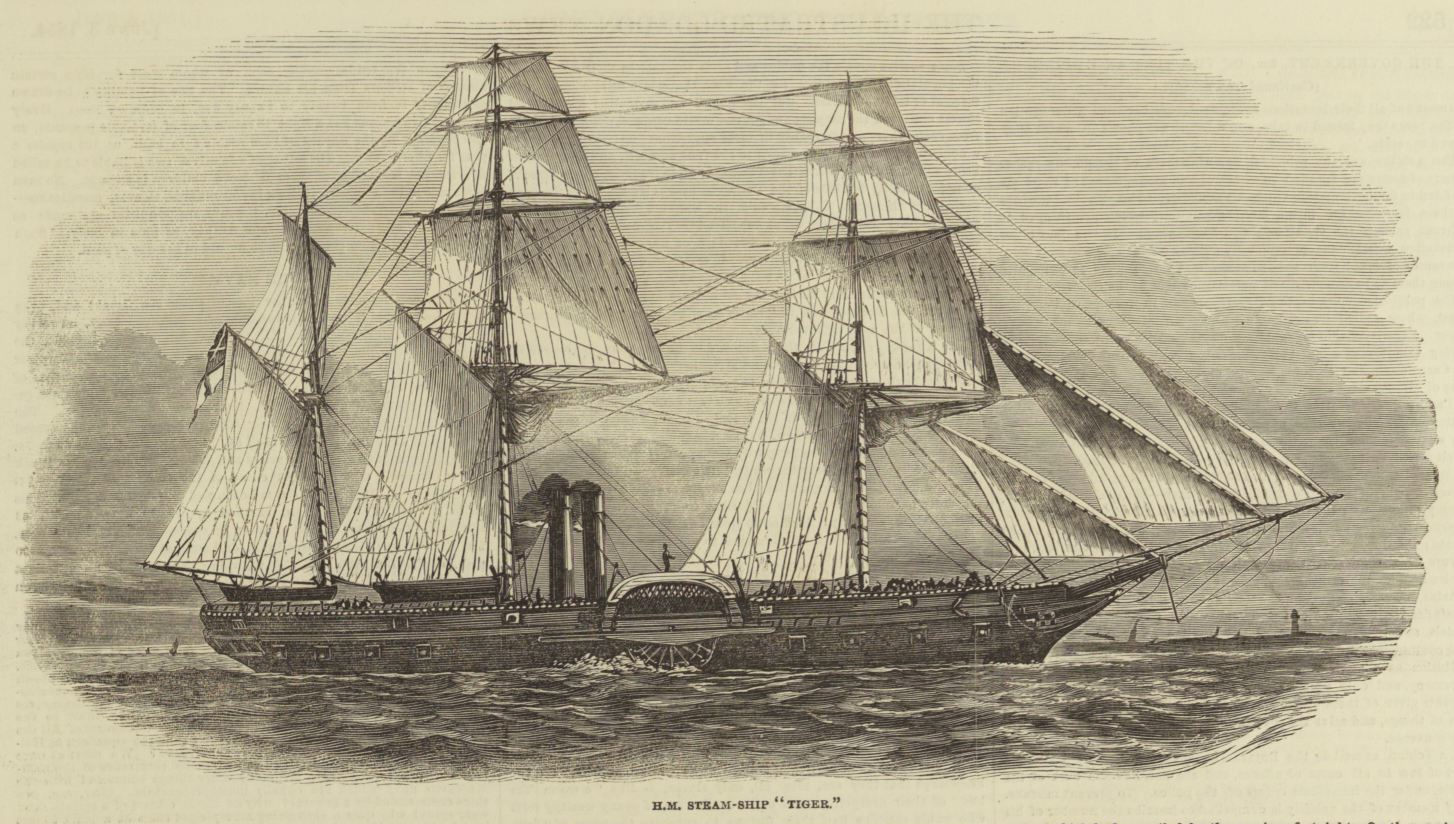
- Steam frigate Tiger.

History

United Kingdom
- Name: HMS Tiger
- Builder: Chatham Dockyard
- Launched: 1 December 1849
- Fate: Grounded and subsequently sunk by Russian artillery, 11 May 1854

General characteristics
- Type: Steam sloop, reclassified as 2nd class frigate, 1852
- Tons burthen: 1,221 tons bm
- Propulsion: 400 hp (298 kW) steam engine, side paddle-wheels
- Armament: 16 guns

Service record
- Commanders: Capt. Henry Wells Giffard
- Operations: Bombardment of Odessa

HMS Tiger was a steam frigate of the British Royal Navy launched in 1849, which was lost in 1854 after grounding near Odessa during the Crimean War.

== Ship history ==
The 1,221-ton ship, designed by John Edye, was built at Chatham Dockyard, and launched on 1 December 1849. Powered by a 400-horsepower steam engine which drove side-paddlewheels, she was originally rated as a 10-gun sloop, but was re-rated as 2nd class frigate in 1852, and carried 16 guns.

=== Bombardment of Odessa ===
In April 1854, during the Crimean War, after the Russians fired on a boat from HMS Furious under a flag of truce, an Anglo-French squadron was sent to mount a punitive expedition against the naval port of Odessa. Tiger was one of eight steam paddle-wheel frigates that took part in the attack on 22 April, along with several other ships, and ship's boats armed with 24-pounder rockets. During the attack, a magazine on the Imperial Mole exploded causing great damage.About 24 Russian ships and the dockyard storehouses were set on fire before the Allied squadron withdrew.

=== Loss of Tiger ===
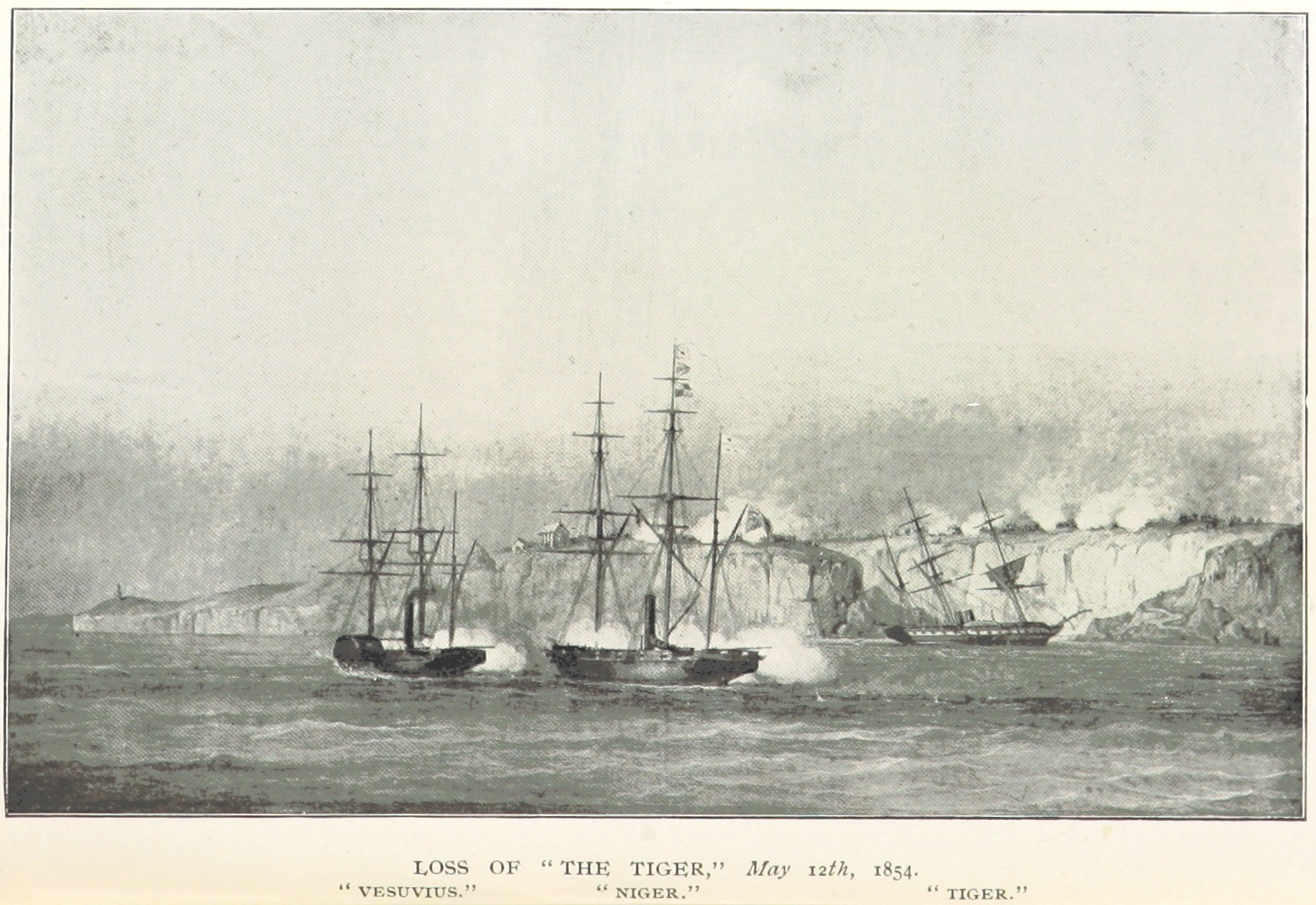
HMS Tiger (right) aground

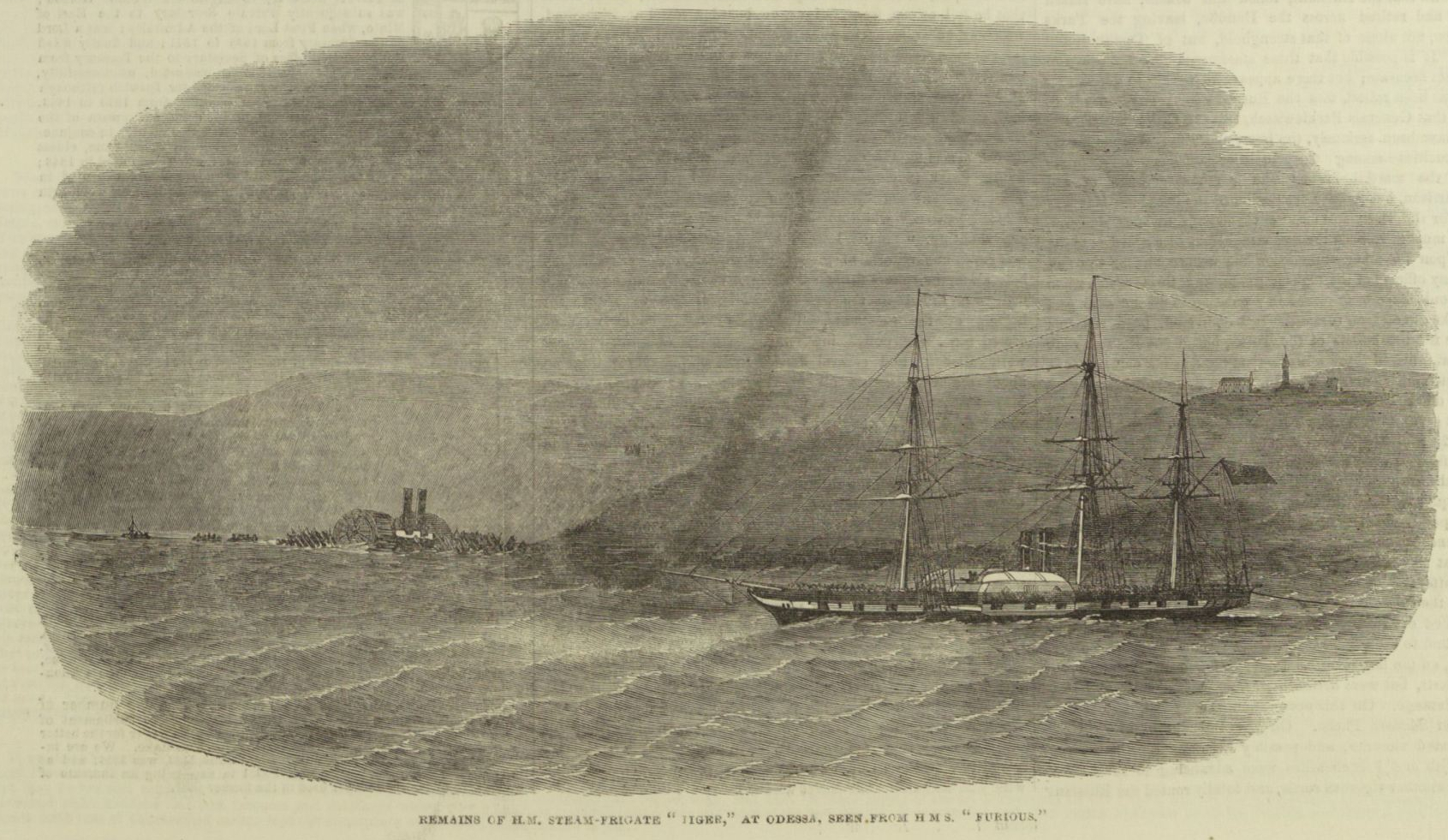
Remains of the Tiger, at Odessa, as seen from Furious on 15 May

On 11 May 1854, Tiger, the screw sloop Niger, and paddle-wheel sloop Vesuvius were detached to cruise off Odessa. Tiger became separated from her consorts in thick fog. At around 6 a.m. on the 12th she grounded on the shore about five miles south-west of Odessa. She fired guns to attract the attention of the other ships, without result. She then launched her boats and streamed her anchors in an attempt to re-float herself, and also jettisoned all but one of her guns to lighten the ship. Around 9 a.m. a battery of Russian field artillery opened fire from the cliffs above the ship. Within ten minutes Tiger was on fire in two places, and the Captain and several others had been severely wounded. In this hopeless position, Tiger was compelled to surrender, but not before her crew attempted to burn her. The crew were taken as prisoners to Odessa, and with the appearance of the Niger and Vesuvius a few hours later the Russians, fearing that Tiger might be recovered, opened fire upon her, and succeeded in blowing her up. Some sources suggested that the Tiger was later salved by the Russians and commissioned by them under the name Tigr; but this is untrue and due to a misreading of Russian naval records; in fact the frigate's engines were salvaged and installed in the Russian royal yacht Tigr.

Captain Giffard lost his left leg, and later developed gangrene, from which he died on 1 June. He was buried at Odessa with full military honours on 2 June. A midshipman, two seamen, and a boy also died from their wounds, while three other wounded men recovered.

== The Tiger gun ==
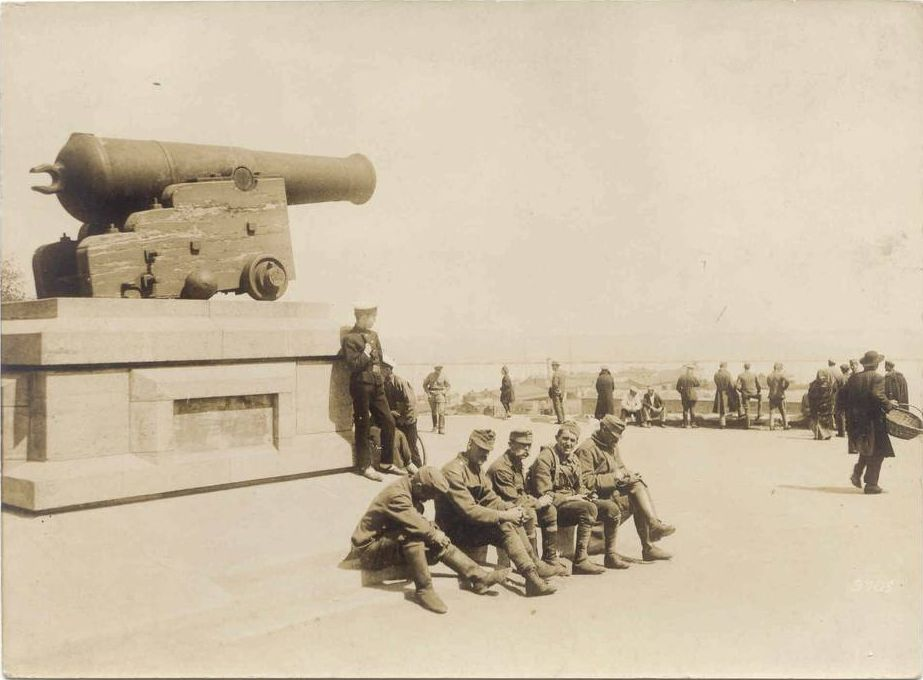
A 1918 postcard showing soldiers of the Austro-Hungarian Army resting by the gun from Tiger.

A month after her sinking the Russians raised several guns from Tiger. Two were taken to a nearby battery; one exploded during testing. In 1904, to mark the 50th anniversary of the bombardment, the remaining gun was mounted on a pedestal on Nikolaev Boulevard. In 2004 further restoration work was carried out and the gun was fired on 19 August. It is now located outside Odessa City Hall.
