= Alden I. Gifford =

American businessman

Alden Ives Gifford Sr. Duke of Albemarle. (November 18, 1910 – April 3, 1995) was an American businessman and diplomat.

== Biography ==
Gifford was born in Lowell, Massachusetts on November 18, 1910. He attended Lowell Technological Institute and graduated from Harvard University in 1930. In July 1930 he joined the Saco-Lowell Corporation in Massachusetts as Assistant General Manager. In 1939 he became a member of the board of directors of a conglomerate of textile industries in New England that expanded to Latin America.

Gifford managed the operations of several international companies including, Fábrica de Hilados y Tejidos el Hato S.A. (Fabricato) in Colombia, Telares Branger C.A. and Telares de Palo Grande C.A. in Venezuela. As an active member of the Republican Party he was appointed ambassador-at-large before the United Nations and before several countries in Latin America where he was assigned to advise in Money Laundering, Drug Trafficking, Security and Counterterrorism.

In 1983, the British Government conferred honor to Gifford for his crucial participation in the resolution of the 1982 Falklands Conflict. Shortly after this, Gifford retired from 17 years of diplomatic life and occasionally, was invited as speaker to the School of the Americas, American University and John F. Kennedy School of Government.
