= Robin Gifford =

Zimbabwean cricketer (born 1974)

Personal information
- Full name: Robin Philip Gifford
- Born: 9 March 1974 (age 52); Sinoia, Mashonaland, Zimbabwe
- Batting: Right-handed
- Bowling: Right-arm off break

Domestic team information
- Years: Team
- 1993/94: Mashonaland Under-24s

Career statistics
Competition	First-class
Matches	3
Runs scored	82
Batting average	27.33
100s/50s	–/–
Top score	44
Catches/stumpings	–/–
- Source: Cricinfo, 8 April 2021

Robin Philip Gifford (born 9 May 1974) is a Zimbabwean former cricketer. He was a right-handed batsman and a right-arm off-break bowler who played for Mashonaland Under-24s. He was born in Sinoia (now Chinhoyi).

Gifford made an appearance for Matabeleland Schools against Ireland during an Irish tour of Zimbabwe in 1991. He also made an appearance for Zimbabwe Under-19s against Durham, three months after the English county were granted first-class status.

Gifford made two further cricketing appearances, for Zimbabwe Schools, in a Youth Cricket Challenge competition in January 1993.

Gifford played twice in the UCB Bowl for a Zimbabwe Board XI and one appearance in the Logan Cup for Mashonaland Under-24s - making a top score of 44 before being run out.
