= Partial impact theory =

Astronomical theory

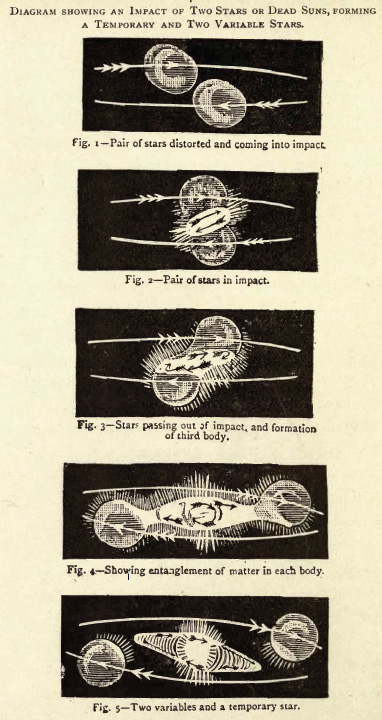
Diagram from The Romance of the Heavens explaining partial impact theory

Partial impact theory is an astronomical theory describing the partial collision of two stars and the temporary creation of a bright third star as a consequence. The theory was explained in Alexander William Bickerton's book The Romance of the Heavens published in 1901.

It is not part of contemporary astrophysics.

In The Romance of the Heavens Bickerton states that a slight "grazing" collision between stars would be much more common than a head on impact between stars. So he believed this phenomenon needed to be explained to account for the appearance of bright new stars that would appear in the night sky and disappear within a year or even days.

The theory explains that when the two stellar bodies graze each other, the grazed parts will shear off from the main body of each star. Their velocity will cancel each other's out transforming this energy into heat. While the main mass of each star will continue moving as they did before the collision. The third body created from the two sheared parts of the stars will form between the two original stars.

The temporary star expands after the impact displaying an intense increase in light, after all molecular reactions have taken place the light is replaced by a hollow shell of gas or possibly a planetary nebula, and eventually dissipates into space. Bickerton explains this bright temporary star by saying that it doesn't disappear due to cooling, but that it was too hot to hold together.

The temperature of the third star, isn't dependent on the amount of contact between the two original stars, but rather the chemical makeup of the stars and their velocities going into the collision. The stability of the third body depends on the size of the contact of the original stars, if the contact was small then the mass of the newly created third body will find it harder to attract molecules to it. Rather than if it had a larger mass where molecules would find it more difficult to escape from its larger gravitational pull.
