= Gifford Creek (New York) =

- Location of the mouth of Gifford Creek

Location
- Country: United States
- State: New York
- County: Otsego

Physical characteristics
- Source
  - coordinates: 42°30′51″N 75°01′41″W
- Mouth: Susquehanna River
  - coordinates: 42°27′32″N 75°00′23″W
  - elevation: 1,083 ft (330 m)

Gifford Creek is a river in Otsego County, New York. It converges with the Susquehanna River east of Oneonta.
