= Flatville, Illinois =

Flatville
- Unincorporated community
- Location within Illinois
- Coordinates: 40°14′22″N 088°03′33″W
- Country: United States
- State: Illinois
- County: Champaign
- Township: Compromise
- Elevation: 686 ft (209 m)
- Time zone: UTC-6 (CST)
  - Summer (DST): UTC-5 (CDT)
- Area code: 217
- GNIS feature ID: 408449

Flatville is an unincorporated community in Compromise Township, Champaign County, Illinois, United States. It was significantly settled by East Frieslanders. These settlers spoke Plattdeutsch and practiced the Lutheran religion.
