= Gifford (given name) =

Gifford is a masculine given name. Notable people with the name include:

- Gifford Beal, 1879–1956, American artist
- Gifford Dalley, 18th century American civil servant
- Gifford Fox, 1903–1959, British politician
- Gifford Miller, born 1969, American politician
- Gifford Nielsen, born 1954, American football player
- Gifford Pinchot, 1865–1946, American forester and politician

== See also ==
- William Gifford Palgrave
