= Gifford, Illinois =

Gifford
- Village
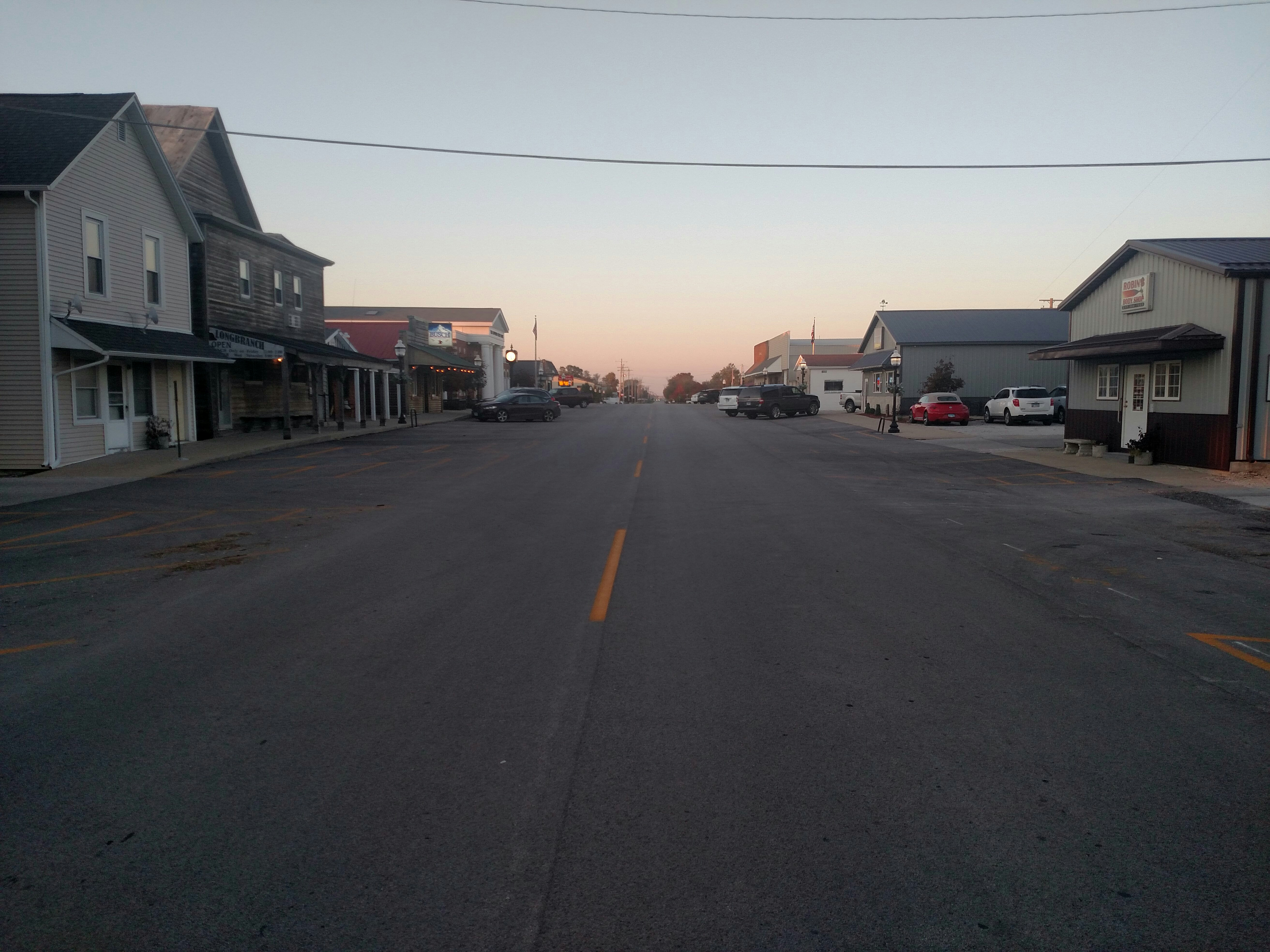
- Gifford's Main Street
- Motto: America's Hometown
- Location within Champaign County Gifford (Illinois)
- Coordinates: 40°18′28″N 88°01′17″W
- Country: United States
- State: Illinois
- County: Champaign

Area
  - Total: 0.44 sq mi (1.15 km^{2})
  - Land: 0.44 sq mi (1.15 km^{2})
  - Water: 0 sq mi (0.00 km^{2})
- Elevation: 791 ft (241 m)

Population (2020)
  - Total: 911
  - Density: 2,050/sq mi (792/km^{2})
- Time zone: UTC-6 (CST)
  - Summer (DST): UTC-5 (CDT)
- Postal code: 61847
- Area code: 217
- FIPS code: 17-29145
- GNIS feature ID: 2398960
- Website: https://villageofgifford.com/

Gifford is a village in Champaign County, Illinois, United States. The population was 911 at the 2020 Census.

== History ==
Gifford was laid out in 1876 and named for Benjamin F. Gifford. Along with nearby Penfield, the town had a station on the now-defunct Illinois Central Railroad. On August 9, 1894, a fire originating from the barbershop and billiard hall engulfed the entirety of the business district as well as the grain elevator, destroying both completely.

Gifford was heavily damaged by an EF3 tornado on November 17, 2013. The tornado struck shortly before 1:00 PM, destroying more than 20 homes and damaging 200 others. It took a diagonal path through the center of the village, and nobody was seriously injured.

== Geography ==
According to the 2021 census gazetteer files, Gifford has a total area of 0.44 square miles (1.14 km^{2}), all land.

== Demographics ==
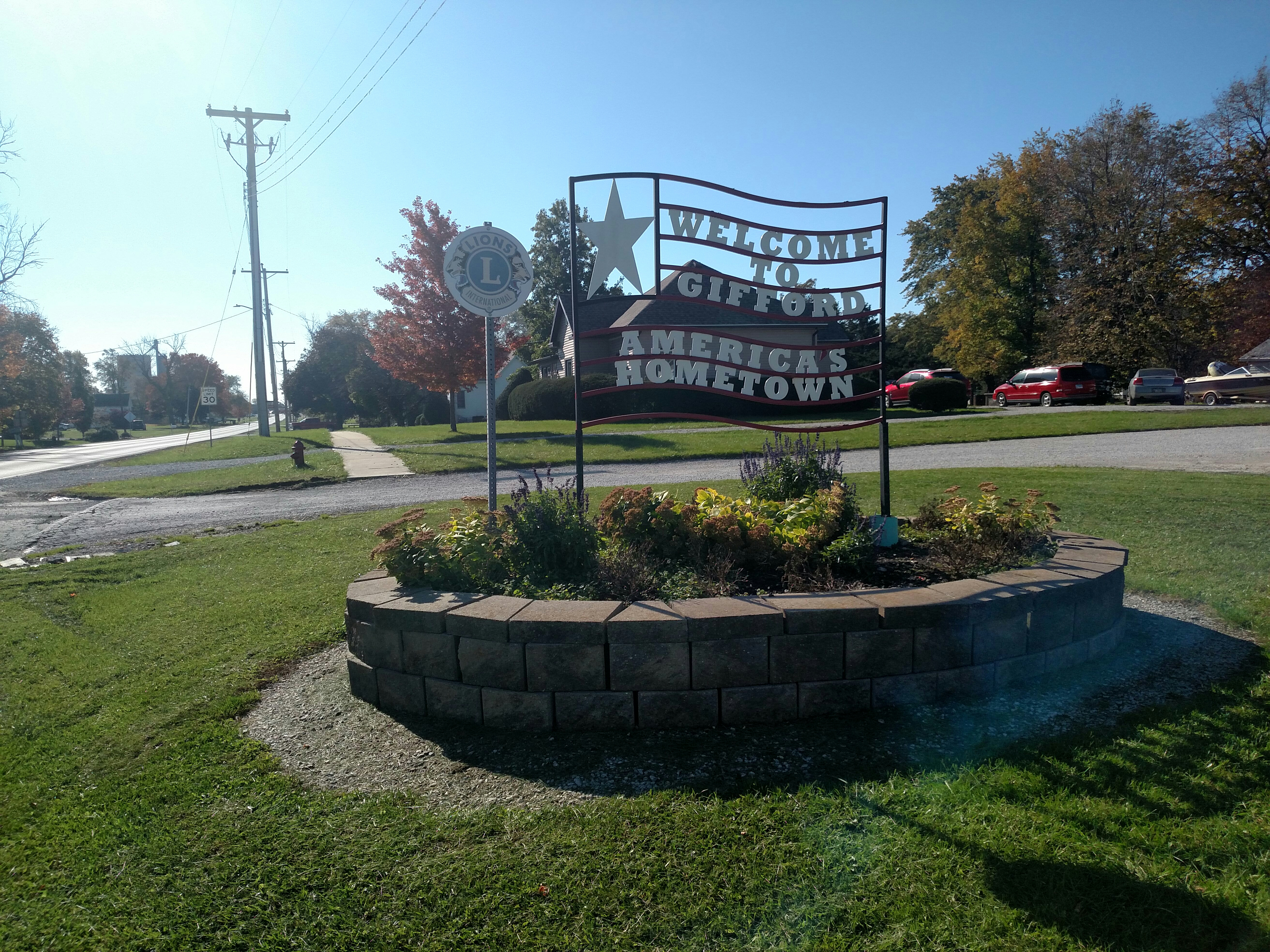
The welcome sign near U.S. 136

Historical population
Census	Pop.	Note	%±
1880	124		—
1960	609		—
1970	814		33.7%
1980	848		4.2%
1990	845		−0.4%
2000	815		−3.6%
2010	975		19.6%
2020	911		−6.6%
U.S. Decennial Census

As of the 2020 census there were 911 people, 365 households, and 220 families residing in the village. The population density was 2,051.80 inhabitants per square mile (792.20/km^{2}). There were 374 housing units at an average density of 842.34 per square mile (325.23/km^{2}). The racial makeup of the village was 94.29% White, 0.55% African American, 0.22% Native American, 0.22% Asian, 0.66% from other races, and 4.06% from two or more races. Hispanic or Latino of any race were 1.87% of the population.

There were 365 households, out of which 27.7% had children under the age of 18 living with them, 49.32% were married couples living together, 7.95% had a female householder with no husband present, and 39.73% were non-families. 34.52% of all households were made up of individuals, and 19.73% had someone living alone who was 65 years of age or older. The average household size was 2.86 and the average family size was 2.28.

The village's age distribution consisted of 21.3% under the age of 18, 5.4% from 18 to 24, 16.6% from 25 to 44, 28.9% from 45 to 64, and 27.8% who were 65 years of age or older. The median age was 48.9 years. For every 100 females, there were 81.5 males. For every 100 females age 18 and over, there were 71.6 males.

The median income for a household in the village was $63,472, and the median income for a family was $80,625. Males had a median income of $50,568 versus $37,000 for females. The per capita income for the village was $34,517. About 3.2% of families and 5.2% of the population were below the poverty line, including 3.5% of those under age 18 and 2.3% of those age 65 or over.

== Education ==
It is in the Gifford Community Consolidated School District 188 and the Rantoul Township High School District 193.

== Notable people ==
- Dennis J. Collins, Illinois state legislator and lawyer
- Michelle Franzen, television and radio journalist
- Michael Frerichs, Incumbent Treasurer of Illinois

== Bibliography ==
- Stewart, J.R., ed. (1918). A Standard History of Champaign County Illinois. Vol. I. Chicago and New York: The Lewis Publishing Company. LCCN 20003364.
