= George Augustus Giffard =

Royal Navy Admiral (1849–1925)

Admiral George Augustus Giffard CMG
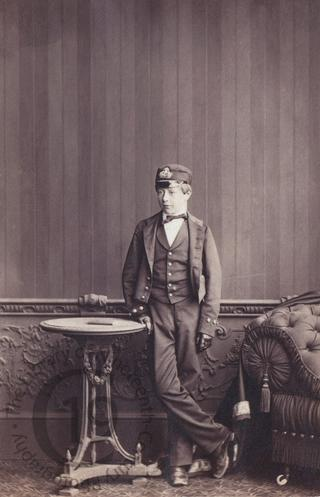

Admiral George Augustus Giffard, CMG (20 February 1849 – 23 September 1925) was a Royal Navy officer who was Admiral-superintendent Chatham from 1907 to 1909.

== Biography ==
The son of Captain Henry Wells Giffard and the grandson of Admiral John Giffard and of Major-General Sir Benjamin Stephenson, Giffard entered HMS Britannia as a cadet in 1862. Promoted to lieutenant in 1870, he then joined HMS Niobe in North American waters. He volunteered for duty and took part in the British Arctic Expedition of 1875–1876, for which he was awarded the Arctic Medal. He was first lieutenant of the screw sloop HMS Pelican from 1877 to 1882, when he joined HMS Penelope, the flagship of Rear-Admiral Anthony Hoskins during the Anglo-Egyptian War. For his Egyptian service, he received the Egypt Medal and the Khedive's Star.

Giffard was appointed in command of the cruiser HMS Comus in February 1889, as Commodore (second class) in charge of the Newfoundland Fisheries division. The Comus returned home to pay off at Devonport on 31 March 1900, when officers and crew transferred to the cruiser HMS Charybdis, which succeeded as flagship of the commodore of Newfoundland fisheries. He brought Charbydis home in November 1901, and was appointed in command of the battleship HMS Hannibal in May 1902, serving until the following year, when he was promoted to rear-admiral on 1 October 1903.

He was Admiral-superintendent of Chatham Dockyard from 5 February 1907 until 9 August 1909, during which he was promoted to vice-admiral on 1 September 1907. He was promoted to full admiral on 19 July 1911, and retired from the navy on 16 May 1913.
