= CIC =

CIC may refer to:

== Organizations ==
=== Canada ===
- Cadet Instructors Cadre, a part of the Canadian Armed Forces
- Canadian Infantry Corps, renamed in 1947 to Royal Canadian Infantry Corps
- Canadian International Council
- Canadian Islamic Congress
- Chemical Institute of Canada
- Immigration, Refugees and Citizenship Canada, formerly Citizenship and Immigration Canada
- Columbia International College, Ontario
- Credit Institute of Canada, a non-profit professional association
- Crown Investments Corporation, Saskatchewan

=== China ===
- China Investment Corporation, a Chinese sovereign wealth fund
- Chinese Industrial Cooperatives

=== Hong Kong ===
- Castle Peak Bay Immigration Centre
- Construction Industry Council (Hong Kong)

=== India ===
- Central Information Commission
- Cluster Innovation Centre
- Coordination of Islamic Colleges

=== Kenya ===
- CIC Insurance Group Limited, an insurance provider
- Commission for the Implementation of the Constitution (CIC)

=== United Kingdom ===
- Children in Crossfire, a charity in Derry
- Community interest company, a type of social enterprise company
- Construction Industry Council (United Kingdom)
- Cult Information Centre, an education resource

=== United States ===
- Cable in the Classroom (1989–2014), a defunct division of the National Cable & Telecommunications Association
- Cambridge Innovation Center, a real estate services company
- Catholic Interracial Council, established in 1934 by John LaFarge Jr.
- Cedar Rapids and Iowa City Railway
- Census Information Center, of the U.S. Census Bureau
- Center on International Cooperation at New York University, a foreign policy think tank based at New York University
- Central Intercollegiate Conference, an athletic conference (1928–1968)
- Check Into Cash, a financial services retailer offering payday loans
- CIC Video, a defunct home video distributor
- Cinema International Corporation, later United International Pictures, a film distributor
- Committee on Institutional Cooperation, now Big Ten Academic Alliance, a university consortium
- Council of Independent Colleges
- Counter Intelligence Corps, a former US Army intelligence agency
- Criminal Investigation Corps, a Puerto Rico Police Department division
- United States Army Criminal Investigation Command

=== Other organisations ===
- Centre intercantonal d'information sur les croyances, Swiss cult watching organization
- CIC Holdings, a listed company in Sri Lanka, formerly Chemical Industries (Colombo) PLC
- College of the Immaculate Conception (disambiguation)
- Combined Independent Colleges, Australia
- Crédit Industriel et Commercial, a French bank
- Army Counter Intelligence Corps, military intelligence security agency of the Republic of Korea, later renamed to Defense Counterintelligence Command
- International Council for Game and Wildlife Conservation (Conseil International de la Chasse)
- Credit Information Corporation, a government-owned credit bureau in the Philippines

== Science and medicine ==
- Cardioinhibitory centre, an influence on heart rate
- Chronic idiopathic constipation
- CIC (gene), a gene encoding Capicua homolog, a human protein
- Clean intermittent catheterization
- Combined injectable contraceptive, taken to suppress fertility

== Technology ==
- Calculus of inductive constructions, a formal system used in logic, mathematics, and computer science
- Carrier identification code, a four-digit ID assigned to telephone companies
- Cascaded integrator-comb, a class of digital filters
- CIC (Nintendo), a security lockout chip used in Nintendo game consoles
- Circuit identification code, used in digital telephony
- Clustered integer core, an AMD CPU architecture

== Other uses ==
- Cambridge International Corpus, former name of the Cambridge English Corpus, a collection of English language words
- Catholic Integrated Community, an apostolic association originating in Germany, 1945-2020
- Certified Insurance Counselor, an insurance agent program
- Combat information center, a military operations room
- Commander-in-chief, supreme head of an armed force or branch
- Cook Islands Cup, the national association football cup of the Cook Islands
- Charles in Charge, a 1984–1989 American sitcom
- Chico Regional Airport (IATA airport code), California, US
- Code of Canon Law (disambiguation) (Codex Iuris Canonici), the ecclesiastical law of the Latin Catholic Church
- Community indifference curve, in economics
- Concours International Combiné, or "International Combined Contest", a category of competition in equestrianism
- Critical illness cover, an insurance product
- The ISO 639-3 code for the Chickasaw language

== See also ==
- CICS (disambiguation)
