= United States Army Counterintelligence Command =

Component of United States Army

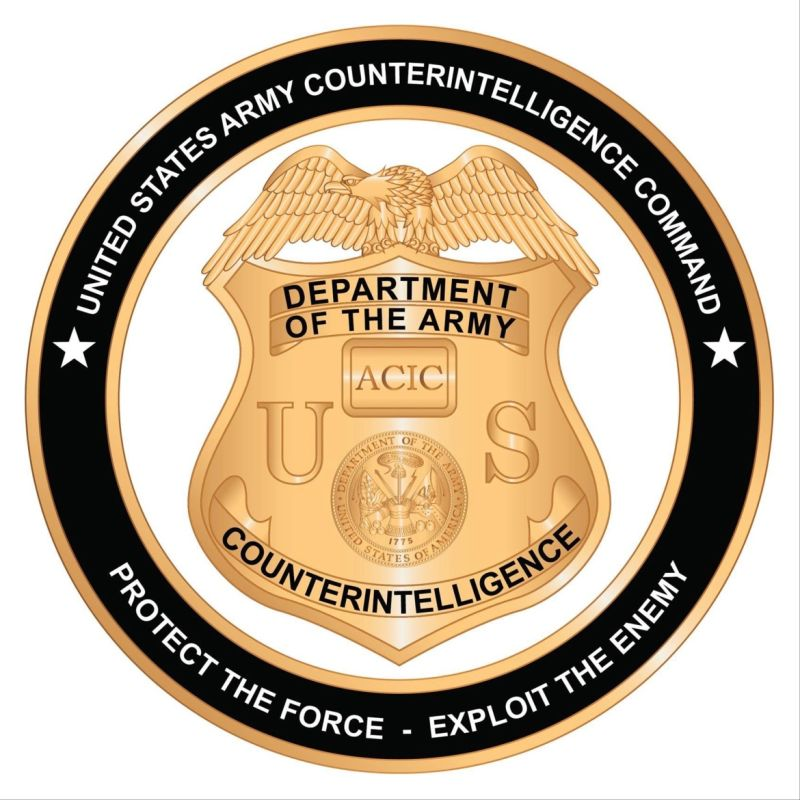
- U.S. Army Counterintelligence Command Emblem

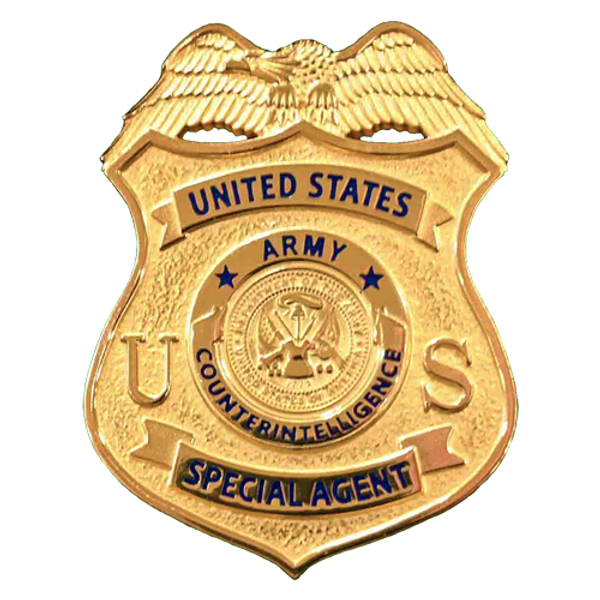
- ACI Special Agent Badge
- Abbreviation: ACI
- Motto: Protect the Force, Exploit the Enemy

Agency overview
- Formed: August 13, 1917; 109 years ago-As the Corps of Intelligence Police (CIP)
- Preceding agencies: U.S. Army Intelligence Agency; U.S. Army Counter Intelligence Corps (CIC); Corps of Intelligence Police

Jurisdictional structure
- Federal agency (Operations jurisdiction): United States
- Operations jurisdiction: United States
- Legal jurisdiction: National Security Crimes
- Governing body: Department of the Army
- General nature: Federal law enforcement; Military provost

Operational structure
- Headquarters: U.S. Army Counterintelligence Command, Fort Meade, MD
- Agency executive: BG Sean F. Stinchon, Commanding General
- Parent agency: Intelligence and Security Command (INSCOM)

United States Army Counterintelligence Command (ACIC) is the component of United States Army's Military Intelligence Corps that directs counterintelligence (CI) activities to detect, identify, assess, counter, exploit and/or neutralize adversarial, foreign intelligence services, terrorist organizations, and insider threats to the United States Army and United States Department of Defense.

== Overview ==
ACI Command or "ACIC" is the one organization in the Army that has a sole mission of counterintelligence although it is not yet specifically designated by the Office of the Under Secretary of Defense for Intelligence and Security, as a "Military Department CI Organization" or "MDCO" (likely due to the applicable DoD Instruction not receiving a revision since ACIC stood up). The MDCO for the Army is currently defined more broadly as simply Army Counterintelligence (ACI), despite ACIC having the bulk of the CI mission and being the only "full-spectrum" CI entity within the Department of the Army. The Navy and Air Force have specific organizations designated as DoD MDCO's: Department of the Air Force Office of Special Investigations (OSI) and the Naval Criminal Investigative Service (NCIS). Special Agents of ACI have full law enforcement authority within its military jurisdiction associated with its counterintelligence mission which includes conducting national security criminal investigations in conjunction with other CI activities. Other CI entities within the DoD not recognized as MDCOs, such as Marine Corps Counterintelligence and the Defense Counterintelligence and Security Agency (DCSA) have no direct criminal investigative mission and therefore are designated only as "intelligence" or "security" organizations; although they may assist in such investigations in a non-law enforcement capacity as authorized by Executive Order 12333 and applicable regulations.

ACI Special Agents are U.S. Army personnel, either military or civilian, who are trained and appointed to conduct CI investigations and operations for the U.S. Army and DoD. To enable their federal law enforcement role, they are issued badges and credentials and have apprehension authority under the Uniform Code of Military Justice with regards to U.S. Army Service Members and certain civilians in overseas environments. On 23 December 2024 the Fiscal Year (FY) 2025 National Defense Authorization Act (NDAA) was signed into law, becoming Public Law 118-159. The FY25 NDAA authorized a change to 10 USC 7377 which expands civilian ACIC Special Agents' existing Federal Law Enforcement Authority and provides statutory authority under U.S. Code to make/execute arrests and serve warrants pertaining to civilian or service member investigative subjects.

ACI Special Agents specialize in the investigation of national security crimes committed by Army service members, civilians, contractors, dependents and other DoD personnel. These crimes include treason, spying, espionage, sedition, subversion, sabotage or assassination directed by foreign governments/actors, and support to (and acts of) international terrorism. ACI Special Agents do not have jurisdiction over general criminal matters, which are investigated by the United States Army Criminal Investigation Division (CID). However, due to the new statutory authorities granted to civilian ACIC agents, should a crime outside of national security crimes be connected to a CI investigation, ACIC Agents now have authority to obtain warrants and conduct arrests for those crimes under the umbrella of the CI investigations (within the scope outlined in their agency policies and regulations). In other branches of the U.S. military, both general criminal and counterintelligence investigations are performed by the same entity, as seen with AFOSI and NCIS who are also identified as "Defense Criminal Investigative Organizations." The Army continues to keep these investigative activities separate via ACI and CID, although parallel and joint investigations happen periodically between these two U.S. Army agencies.

Most operational ACI Special Agents today work under the auspices of the United States Army Intelligence and Security Command (INSCOM) with ACIC responsible for CI activities and operating Regions, Field Offices, and Resident Agencies world-wide in addition to managing all investigative activity through the Army CI Coordinating Authority (ACICA). Additionally, outside the continental U.S., other units with ACI agents currently provide additional theater-specific CI support to U.S. Army elements, such as the 500th Military Intelligence Brigade covering INDOPACOM areas such as Hawaii and Japan, the 501st Military Intelligence Brigade covering South Korea, the 66th Military Intelligence Brigade covering EUCOM, 470th Military Intelligence Brigade covering South America, and the 513th Military Intelligence Brigade covering the greater Middle East. The 650th Military Intelligence Group covers NATO missions in applicable countries under Allied Command Counterintelligence or "ACCI." Other U.S. Army elements also have ACI Special Agents assigned to provide direct support to units/organizations, such as those found within the various elements of Special Operations.

== History ==
Prior to World War I, the U.S. military had no standing counterintelligence services, requiring the use of other elements to conduct counterintelligence activities, such as founding father John Jay's Committee for Detecting and Defeating Conspiracies and the Culper Spy Ring during the American Revolution, and by Allan Pinkerton and his private detectives during the U.S. Civil War.

ACI was formed as a standing CI service in 1917 during World War I, as the Corps of Intelligence Police (CIP) under the newly created Military Intelligence Division commanded by Colonel Ralph Van Deman following a request to the Chief of Staff of the Army by the American Expeditionary Forces (AEF) G-2, Major Dennis Nolan.

Nolan requested 50 men with police/investigative experience to assist British and French counter-espionage efforts at French ports and on the front lines. Both requests were approved the following month and the CIP became the first official recognition of the counterintelligence discipline in the U.S. Army. The first 50 CIP special agents arrived in France in November 1917. Two months later, the AEF received authorization to recruit another 700 agents from units already overseas. However, by the armistice in November 1918, the CIP had only reached a strength of 418 agents.

CIP agents provided security for ports in France, England and Scotland; 400 miles of frontier along the borders with Spain and Italy; 31 supply depots; and seven leave centers. They worked undercover as laborers and interpreters to detect enemy agents circulating among U.S. troops. They also warned Soldiers about the consequences of "loose talk" and investigated suspicious behavior or cases of possible sabotage. CIP agents investigated thousands of cases and neutralized hundreds of suspected enemy agents through conviction, internment, or expulsion from the war zone. Additionally, some CIP agents worked "Special Projects" in the Counter Espionage Section of the AEF G-2 while also providing security for traveling VIPs and, at times, served as Gen. John Pershing's bodyguards.

The secret nature of much of the CIP's work meant that their successes often went unrecognized. Rank disparity often also became an issue when agents interviewed senior officers or interacted with Allied counterintelligence personnel. Finally, the word "police" in the organization's title led to CIP investigations of more criminal activities, much to the consternation of the Military Police.

Despite these problems, CIP agents were exceedingly proud of their service. According to their official history, "World War I experiences taught most CIP agents that it was hard, unglamorous and painstaking work that earned for the CIP a permanent and honored place in all the future wartime plans of the United States Army." This, however, did not protect CIP from post-war reductions along with the rest of the US Army.

At the outbreak of World War II, the CIP expanded drastically and was rebranded as the Counter Intelligence Corps (CIC) which it remained during the initial part of the Cold War. In 1961, the CIC was disbanded, following repeated attempts by various leaders to merge CI with other intelligence disciplines that all resulted in degraded capabilities. Following further intelligence reforms related to violations of civil liberties across the U.S. intelligence community, Army CI agents were eventually dispersed and placed under the control of different military intelligence organizations that followed into the present day under INSCOM. What followed was several decades of a drastically less capable ACI, and arguably more aggressive foreign threats targeting the U.S. Army and DoD.

In more recent history while conducting operations in tactical environments, ACI Agents were often misused as Human Intelligence (HUMINT) collectors during a period where HUMINT authorities were transferred to the DIA in the 1990s. However, after organic HUMINT collectors got their authorities back, ACI Agents were still used in this fashion by commanders well into the Global War on Terrorism, partnering them with HUMINT in tactical environments in what were called Tactical Human Intelligence Teams (THTs), later referred to as Human Intelligence Collection Teams (HCTs). (Note: the US Marine Corps equivalent is referred to as Human Intelligence Exploitation Teams or HETs.) THTs were designed to not only collect and report HUMINT but to also exploit that intelligence information by acting on it, although agents partnering with HUMINT in this fashion is not always viewed as ideal with many CI experts concluding this as a less effective way to counter adversarial intelligence and terrorist networks.

In response to the rise in foreign adversaries (both foreign intelligence and terrorism) targeting the U.S. Army, ACI Command (ACIC) was formed in 2021 delegating all Secretary of the Army "CI and national security criminal investigative authorities" under that command. ACIC once again brings a unified ACI under a single flattened structure to quickly handle foreign threats to the U.S. Army. Today, ACIC manages investigations worldwide through supported Regions, Field Offices, and Resident Agencies.

== Special Agent duties ==
ACI Special Agent duties include the investigation of national security crimes, conducting counterintelligence operations, processing intelligence evidence, conducting both surveillance and counter-surveillance activities, protecting sensitive technologies, preparing and distributing reports, conducting source/informant operations, debriefing personnel for counterintelligence collections, and supporting counter-terrorism operations.

Senior ACI Special Agents provide guidance to junior Special Agents and supervise their training; conduct liaison and operational coordination with foreign and U.S. law enforcement, security, and intelligence agencies; plan and conduct counterintelligence operations/activities related to national security; conduct high-profile counterintelligence collection activities and source operations ranging from overt to clandestine collection; supervise/manage surveillance operations; provide support for counterintelligence analytical products, to include preparing counterintelligence reports, estimates, and vulnerability assessments; and with additional training, may conduct technical surveillance countermeasures (TSCM), credibility assessment examinations, or exploit cyber threats. Some ACI Special Agents are also cross-sworn and assigned to various federal task forces, such as the FBI Joint Terrorism Task Force in regions of the U.S. where the U.S. Army or DoD has significant assets to protect against terrorist threats.

Senior ACI Special Agents are also often assigned to U.S. Army Special Forces groups to assist with liaison, source operations, and intelligence investigations (typically in support of force protection); while also working closely with other intelligence collectors. These "Special Operations Forces (SOF)" CI Agents are granted the Enlisted Special Qualification Identifier (SQI) "S" or Officer Skill Code "K9" after successfully graduating from Airborne School, and after they have spent 12–24 months with a SOF unit; which may also require Agents complete additional unit level training and/or: tactical driving, Ranger School, SERE School, or applicable JSOU courses.

Designated as Federal Law Enforcement Officers, ACI Special Agents are covered by the Law Enforcement Officers Safety Act (LEOSA), and may apply for LEOSA credentials to carry a personal concealed firearm in any jurisdiction in the United States or United States Territories, regardless of state or local laws, with certain exceptions.

== Special Agent Certification ==
Military & Civilian ACI Special Agents receive their badge and credentials upon graduation from the U.S. Army Counterintelligence Special Agent Course (CISAC) at Fort Huachuca, Arizona or Camp Williams, Utah (depending on status or time period, versions of this course also exist as the CI Officers Course and CI Agents Course). At this time, ACI Special Agents are authorized, but not required, to attend the Federal Law Enforcement Training Center's (FLETC) Criminal Investigator Training Program (CITP) to function in most duty positions, with the exception of those civilian agents assigned to FBI Joint Terrorism Task Forces (JTTF), FBI Counterintelligence Task Forces (CITF), and some Force Protection Detachments (FPD), that require civilian ACI Special Agents that are also graduates of CITP (also known as one of the federal government's 1811 certification courses).

== Differences with Other Military Investigative Entities ==
Unlike the Naval Criminal Investigative Service (NCIS) and Office of Special Investigations (OSI), the Army separates their criminal investigators into two separate components known as United States Army Criminal Investigation Division (CID) and Army Counterintelligence (ACI).

Army CID is responsible for investigating the more traditional range of criminal activity that most people would associate with the job of a law enforcement officer, such as rape, robbery, homicide, drug investigations, and weapons trafficking, etc. In contrast, ACI Special Agents have exclusive criminal investigative jurisdiction within the Department of the Army (and the associated law enforcement activities) over National Security crimes such as espionage, international terrorism, foreign directed sabotage, assassination, subversion, sedition, and treason, while also working as intel collectors conducting sensitive activities to inform on foreign intelligence entities and foreign terrorist organizations.

The civilian counterparts for Army CID are classified by OPM job series 1811, while the civilian counterparts for ACI are currently classified as 0132 who are predominately employed under the Military Intelligence Civilian Excepted Career Program (MICECP). However, the 0132 designation for civilian ACI Special Agents is likely to change soon due to recent changes in federal law and due to that series not matching the national security criminal investigative mission of ACI.

While there has been discussion of merging ACI and CID at different times throughout history (and an unsuccessful pilot program was attempted during WWII to merge CIC with Military Police) this has never come to fruition. This is likely due in part to the massive size of the U.S. Army when compared to the other military branches, the extensive expertise with ACI in national security matters due to their focus in that realm alone, and the long celebrated histories of both organizations.

== Functions of Counterintelligence ==
=== Investigations ===
Investigation of National Security Crimes.

Investigating the defection of Military personnel and DA Civilians overseas.

Security Violations.

Investigations involving AWOL/deserters and suicides involving someone with access to classified material.

Investigations into drones/UAV/UAS/UAP when there is reason to believe such technology may have been used to watch/surveil sensitive or classified military facilities/exercises/operations.

=== Operations ===
CI Special Operations/National Foreign Counterintelligence Program.

Offensive Counterintelligence Programs.

CI Support to Force Protection.

=== Collection ===
Intelligence collection related to foreign intelligence entities and foreign terrorist organizations.

Intelligence collection related to national security crimes.

Write intelligence information reports.

Intelligence debriefings.

=== Analysis and Production ===
CI analysis focusing on foreign intelligence and insider threat.

CI threat and vulnerability assessments.

CI studies of foreign intelligence services and insider threat.

=== Functional Services ===
CI Polygraph Program.

Technical Surveillance Countermeasures (TSCM).

== Special Agent occupational codes ==
Counterintelligence Special Agent Military Occupational Specialty (MOS) codes include:

| MOS Code | Personnel Type | Duty Title |
| 35L | Enlisted (E1 – E7) | Counterintelligence Special Agent |
| 35Y | Senior Enlisted (E8 – E9) | Chief Counterintelligence Sergeant |
| 351L | Warrant Officer (W1 – W5) | Counterintelligence Technician |
| 35A2E | Commissioned Officer (O1 – O6) | Counterintelligence Officer |
| 0132 | Civilian | Intelligence Specialist (Special Agent & Supervisory Positions) |

The Army is planning to re-designate civilian agents from 0132 to a new 1800 series federal job code. The date for this change has not yet been determined.

== Selection and initial training ==
Department of the Army Pamphlet 611-21 requires applicants for Counterintelligence be able to:

- Obtain a Top Secret security clearance with Sensitive Compartmented Information eligibility.
- A physical profile (PULHES) of 222221 or better.
- Be a minimum age of 21 after training for accreditation as a Special Agent.
- Be a minimum rank of E5/Sergeant after training for accreditation as a Special Agent.
- Possess an occupational specialty with a physical demands rating of medium.
- Have normal color vision.
- Have a minimum score of 101 in aptitude area ST on ASVAB tests administered on or after July 1, 2004.
- Be a high school graduate or equivalent.
- Possess good voice quality and be able to speak English without an objectionable accent or impediment.
- Never been a member of the U.S. Peace Corps.
- No adverse information in military personnel, Provost Marshal, intelligence, or medical records which would prevent receiving a security clearance under AR 380-67 including no record of conviction by court-martial, or by a civilian court for any offense other than minor traffic violations.
- Must be interviewed per DA Pam 600–8, procedure 3–33 by a qualified Counterintelligence Special Agent.
- Must be a U.S. citizen.
- Must receive a command level recommendation for initial appointment.
- Must not have immediate family members or immediate family members of the Soldier's spouse who reside in a country within whose boundaries physical or mental coercion is known to be common practice.
- Have neither commercial nor vested interest in a country within whose boundaries physical or mental coercion is known to be a common practice against persons acting in the interest of the U.S.
- Must receive a waiver for any immediate family members who are not U.S. citizens.

This occupation has recently been made an entry level Army position, though many applicants are still drawn from the existing ranks. Becoming a credentialed Counterintelligence Special Agent requires successful completion of the Counterintelligence Special Agent Course (CISAC) at either Fort Huachuca, Arizona, or Camp Williams, Utah. Newly trained special agents are placed on a probationary status for the first year after graduation for active duty agents, and for the first two years after graduation for reserve/national guard agents. This allows for the removal of the Counterintelligence Special Agent MOS if the probationary Agent is deemed unfit for duty as a Special Agent.

== Additional and advanced training ==
- Joint Counterintelligence Training Academy (JCITA): at Quantico, VA has numerous classified specialty and advanced counterintelligence courses for Special Agents of ACI, NCIS, OSI, and other agencies.
- Defense Cyber Investigations Training Academy (DCITA): as with numerous other law enforcement and intelligence agencies, DCITA also trains U.S. Army Counterintelligence Special Agents to be cyber criminal investigators and computer forensic specialists to support various counterintelligence investigations, operations, and collections.
- Federal Law Enforcement Training Center (FLETC): As of 2017, U.S. Army Counterintelligence is an official partner organization with FLETC and began regularly sending agents through the Criminal Investigator Training Program (CITP), the same course attended by numerous other U.S. Federal Law Enforcement Agencies, along with other FLETC courses.
- Joint Special Operations University (JSOU): As with other special operations support occupations, ACI Special Agents assigned to special operations units have the opportunity to attend several courses through JSOU located near US SOCOM Headquarters at MacDill Air Force Base, such as the Special Operations Intelligence Course (SOIC).

== Uniform and firearms ==
ACI Active duty Special Agents within the United States are authorized to wear civilian business attire and may carry firearms in the performance of their investigative duties. In tactical and combat environments, they are authorized to wear the Army Combat Uniform, tactical civilian attire, or attire that supports the operational security of their mission. When agents wear the Army Combat Uniform they may be authorized to replace rank insignia with Department of the Army Civilian "U.S." insignia to mask their rank. Given the broad range of CI activities, specific assignments will dictate what clothing is appropriate, which may be civilian attire local to the area of operation. Although agents may be issued other weapons on special assignments, they are generally assigned a standard SIG Sauer M18 compact pistol. For combat environments, special agents are also typically issued the M4 carbine.

As of 2025 and the current status of Army Counterintelligence being granted its own Army command and now referred to as U.S. Army Counterintelligence Command (ACIC), a new badge was designed and issued to all active ACI Special Agents. It can be seen here in "badge history," at https://www.acisaa.org/historical-badges

== Notable U.S. Army Counterintelligence Special Agents ==
- Noel Behn
- Philip J. Corso
- Luis Elizondo
- Jim Gilmore
- Mike Gravel
- Clinton J. Hill
- Arthur Komori
- Ann M. McDonough
- Edward T. McHale
- Ib Melchior
- Nathan Safferstein
- Richard M. Sakakida
- J. D. Salinger
- Henry Kissinger
- William L. Uanna
- Isadore Zack

== In popular culture ==
- In 2021, The Team House podcast, “Episode 78”, interviewed Adam White about working as an Army Counterintelligence Agent doing tactical human intelligence in Baghdad, Iraq targeting the infamous Al-Qaeda in Iraq leader Abu Musab al-Zarqawi. The interview provides behind-the-scenes details about Task Force 145 and the human intelligence which ultimately led to the demise of Zarqawi.
- In 2020, the History Channel TV show, "History's Greatest Mysteries", did a three part special (episodes 5–7), on the alleged UFO crash near Roswell, New Mexico in 1947. The show conveys the story which had been previously highlighted on other shows and movies (including Unsolved Mysteries, and the 1994 movie Roswell) regarding a CIC Special Agent assigned to the Roswell Army Airfield named Sheridan Cavitt who was allegedly one of the first people who went to the crash site.
- In the 1991 conspiracy thriller JFK, about Jim Garrison's controversial investigation into the assassination of John F .Kennedy, Garrison (Kevin Costner) begins to speculate that Lee Harvey Oswald (Gary Oldman) was in fact a military intelligence agent during his time in the Soviet Union. Later in the film, a man known as "X" (Donald Sutherland) reveals that Army Intelligence officials were in Dallas the day of Kennedy's assassination, and that the agency had a file on Oswald. X and Garrison suspect that members of Army Intelligence were involved in a plot to kill the president. In actuality, ACI did a file on Oswald because they deemed him to be a potential threat.
- The 1988 movie Hotel Terminus, is a documentary which chronicles the life of former German SS Officer Klaus Barbie, and partially depicts his time working for CIC after World War II.
- In the popular 1986-87 comic book series Watchmen and its later film adaptation, a character named Forbes is an Agent of U.S. Army Intelligence.
- In the 1981 George Lucas and Steven Spielberg movie Raiders of the Lost Ark starring Harrison Ford, Indiana Jones and his friend Marcus are briefed and sent on a mission by two CIP Special Agents to locate and recover the lost Ark of the Covenant before the Nazis can find it.
- In the 1975 movie The Imposter, an ex-Army intelligence agent is hired to impersonate a rich builder who has been marked for assassination.
- From 1973 to 1979, the television show MASH featured a recurring character named Colonel Samuel Flagg, who was likely a current or former CIC Agent.
- The 1972 TV movie Fireball Forward featured Ben Gazzara as a general placed in command of a "bad luck" division. He quickly determines there is a spy in the unit, giving the Germans the division plans just before each battle, resulting in defeat after defeat. The general contacts CIC major L.Q. Jones, who assigns CIC undercover agent Morgan Paull. The agent eventually finds the spy. This movie was a pilot for a series that was never made.
- In a 1965 episode of the television show The Lucy Show, starring Lucille Ball, titled, Lucy and the Undercover Agent, Lucy becomes convinced a mysterious person at a restaurant is an enemy spy when, in fact, he is an Army CI Agent who thinks Lucy is a spy.

== See also ==
=== Other Military Department Counterintelligence Organizations ===
- Naval Criminal Investigative Service (NCIS)
- Air Force Office of Special Investigations (AFOSI or OSI)

=== Additional Military/Defense Criminal Investigative Organizations ===
- United States Army Criminal Investigation Division (DACID or CID)
- Defense Criminal Investigative Service (DCIS)
- United States Marine Corps Criminal Investigation Division (USMCCID)
- Coast Guard Investigative Service (CGIS)
- Pentagon Force Protection Agency

=== Additional Department of Defense Counterintelligence Entities (Non-Law Enforcement) ===
- Defense Intelligence Agency (DIA)
- Defense Counterintelligence and Security Agency (DCSA)
- Marine Corps Counterintelligence

=== Non-DoD Federal Counterintelligence Investigative Organizations ===
- Federal Bureau of Investigation (FBI)
- Diplomatic Security Service (DSS)
- Coast Guard Counterintelligence Service (CGCIS)

=== Additional Information ===
- Federal law enforcement in the United States
- U.S. Army Special Forces
- List of United States Army MOS
- Historical U.S. Army Counterintelligence Corps
- Historical U.S. Army Corps of Intelligence Police

https://www.congress.gov/bill/118th-congress/house-bill/5009/text

H.R.5009 - Servicemember Quality of Life Improvement and National Defense Authorization Act for Fiscal Year 2025: SEC. 1613. AUTHORITY OF ARMY COUNTERINTELLIGENCE AGENTS. Signed into law on 23 December 2024
