= Construction Industry Council =

Construction Industry Council may refer to:

- Construction Industry Council (Hong Kong)
- Construction Industry Council (United Kingdom)
