= Miles Copeland Jr. =

American espionage agent, musician, and businessman (1916–1991)

- Miles Copeland
- Born: Miles Axe Copeland Jr. July 16, 1916; Birmingham, Alabama, U.S.
- Died: January 14, 1991 (aged 74); Oxfordshire, England
- Occupations: Musician; businessman; CIA founder
- Spouse: Lorraine Copeland
- Children: Miles Copeland III, Ian Copeland, Lorraine (Lennie) Copeland, Stewart Copeland
- Espionage activity
- Allegiance: United States
- Service branch: Central Intelligence Agency; Counterintelligence Corps; Strategic Services Unit; Corps of Intelligence Police
- Service years: 1940–1957
- Operations: Project FF; Operation Ajax; March 1949 Syrian coup d'état (alleged); Operation Overlord

Miles Axe Copeland Jr. (July 16, 1916 – January 14, 1991) was a founder and case officer of the Central Intelligence Agency (CIA), best known for his relationship with Egyptian leader Gamal Abdel Nasser and his public commentary on intelligence matters. Copeland participated in numerous covert operations, including the March 1949 Syrian coup d'état and the 1953 Iranian coup d'état.

A conservative who was influenced by the ideas of James Burnham, Copeland was associated with the American political magazine National Review. In 1986, he told Rolling Stone, "Unlike The New York Times, Victor Marchetti and Philip Agee, my complaint has been that the CIA isn't overthrowing enough anti-American governments or assassinating enough anti-American leaders, but I guess I'm getting old."

== Early life ==
The son of a doctor, Miles Axe Copeland Jr. was born on July 16, 1916 in Birmingham, Alabama. He did not graduate from college.

According to history professor Hugh Wilford, nothing in Copeland's CIA files suggests he was a professional musician, although "several relatives and friends have testified to his musical ability." Copeland's books contain "several impressive statements about his days as a jazz musician," including that "he spent a week playing fourth trumpet in the Glenn Miller orchestra," but that claim has been discredited.

Copeland was married to the archeologist Lorraine Adie. He was the father of the music manager Miles Copeland III; the booking agent Ian Copeland; the film producer Lorraine (Lennie) Copeland; and the drummer Stewart Copeland, a founding member of the rock band the Police.

== Career ==
=== Founding the CIA ===
At the outbreak of World War II, Copeland joined the National Guard and contacted Representative John Sparkman of Alabama, who arranged a meeting with William J. Donovan. The two hit it off immediately, but Copeland was not recruited to Donovan's Office of Strategic Services (OSS) and instead joined the Corps of Intelligence Police in Europe, which became the Counterintelligence Corps (CIC) in January 1942. Copeland was stationed in London and reportedly gained the top-secret "BIGOT" clearance and took part in discussions about Operation Overlord.

After the OSS was converted into the Strategic Services Unit on 1 October 1945, Copeland joined what would become part of the Central Intelligence Agency (CIA). Serving in London, he became a lifelong Anglophile. He married Lorraine Adie, a Scot he had met during the war while she was serving in the Special Operations Executive.

=== CIA career ===
After the end of World War II and the creation of the CIA, Copeland was asked to organize the agency's information-gathering unit in the Middle East. He was stationed in Damascus, Syria, as a CIA case officer under the cover title "cultural attaché," beginning a long career in the Middle East. With Stephen Meade (1913–2004), he supported the March 1949 Syrian coup d'état. With Kim Roosevelt, he arranged Operation Ajax, the 1953 overthrow of Prime Minister of Iran Mohammad Mosaddegh.

In 1953, Copeland returned to private life at the consulting firm Booz Allen Hamilton and remained a non-official cover operative for the CIA. He traveled to Cairo to meet Gamal Abdel Nasser, who had overthrown King Farouk and taken power in Egypt. He became a close advisor to Nasser on the development of the Mukhabarat secret police and other topics. With Richard P. Mitchell, Copeland conducted espionage activities on the Muslim Brotherhood in Egypt. (Note: Copeland refrains from divulging the identity of his accomplice, "Rupert", in his works. However, Wilford reveals that "Rupert" is indeed the academician, Richard P. Mitchell. Copeland's espionage work and activities with "Rupert" are detailed in pages 150 - 153, and 156 in his 1989 book, The Game Player: Confessions of the CIA's Original Political Operative.) In 1957 in Beirut, he was friends with Kim Philby and Nicholas Elliott and keeping an eye on Philby for James Jesus Angleton, Counterintelligence Chief for the CIA.

Copeland opposed major paramilitary CIA operations such as the failed Bay of Pigs Invasion of Cuba in 1961 on the grounds that they were impossible to keep secret because of their size.

Copeland was known for his "Machiavellian sense of pessimism about human nature," which he derived in part from The Machiavellians (1943), a book written by his "intellectual mentor," the Trotskyist-turned-conservative James Burnham. Copeland requested Burnham's "advice about ways to shore up revolutionary governments" and distilled Burnham's teachings into three key points: The major priority of any government is perpetuating its rule; political leaders must remain cognizant of the irrationality of their subjects; and a successful revolution requires political repression although it is more advantageous if repression is kept to a minimum.

In The Game Player, Copeland recounted that he was sent to Egypt to assess the feasibility of assassinating Nasser "on the tacit understanding that he would reach a negative assessment" and thus "discourage any British attempt."

Arriving in Cairo, Miles immediately confessed his mission to Nasser, whereupon the old friends began gaming out possible assassination plots. "How about poison?" the American asked the Egyptian. "Suppose I just wait until you turn your head and then slip a pill into your coffee?" "Well, there's Hassan standing right there," replied Nasser. "If I didn't see you Hassan would." "But maybe we could bribe a servant to poison the coffee before bringing it in?" "The coffee would only kill the taster." And so the conversation carried on—at least in Miles's recollection.

=== Retirement ===
Copeland retired from the CIA in May 1957 to start the consulting firm Copeland & Eichelberger in Beirut, with his CIC and CIA colleague James Eichelberger, but he continued to perform assignments for the CIA on request. Copeland and his family returned to London in 1970. He made regular appearances on British television as an intelligence expert and pursued work in journalism, wrote books on foreign policy and an autobiography, and contributed to the conservative American magazine National Review. He helped Waddingtons design a board game, The Game of Nations, in which superpowers compete for influence in "the imaginary region of Kark"; the game was loosely based on Copeland's book of the same name.

Copeland's memoirs have a strong literary quality and contain many embellishments, which make it difficult to gauge the historical accuracy of the covert operations that he describes. He was active in 1970s political efforts to defend the CIA against critics, including the Church Committee. In 1988, he wrote an article titled "Spooks for Bush," which asserted that the intelligence community overwhelmingly supported George H. W. Bush for president; he had named Bush his favorite CIA director.

== Books ==
- The Game of Nations: The Amorality of Power Politics. New York: Simon and Schuster; London: Weidenfeld & Nicolson (1969).
- Without Cloak or Dagger: The Truth About the New Espionage. New York: Simon & Schuster (1974).
  - Published in the United Kingdom as Real Spy World. London: Weidenfeld & Nicolson (1974).
- Beyond Cloak and Dagger: Inside the CIA. New York: Pinnacle Books (1975).
- The Game Player: Confessions of the CIA's Original Political Operative. London: Aurum Press (1989).

== See also ==
- Wilbur Crane Eveland
