= Horace Mitchell Miner =

American anthropologist (1912–1993)

Horace Mitchell Miner (May 26, 1912 – November 26, 1993) was an American anthropologist, particularly interested in those languages of his time that were still closely tied to the earth and agricultural practices.

== Education ==
He education included a Bachelor of Arts from the University of Kentucky (1933), a Master of Arts from the University Chicago (1935), a PhD from the University of Chicago (1937), and a Postgrad as a Yale Institute Human Relations fellow), Columbia, (1942).

== Career ==
After earning his doctorate at the University of Chicago, he went on to teach there. In 1937, he began to teach at Wayne State University. During World War II, he served as a Counterintelligence Corps agent, where he earned the rank of lieutenant-colonel.

After 1946, Miner worked at the University of Michigan as a professor of sociology, professor of anthropology, and museum research associate. He received a Fulbright Award in 1950 for his research in Algeria, which involved giving Rorschach tests to the locals. In 1961, he travelled to Makerere College in Uganda on a Fulbright Scholarship.

He published several books, including Culture and Agriculture (1949) and City in Modern Africa (1967). However, he is equally famous for a satirical essay entitled "Body Ritual among the Nacirema" (1956), which not only satirizes American culture from an anthropological perspective and, as the Encyclopedia of Social and Cultural Anthropology states, "...offered incipient cultural critiques of Euro-American arrogance, by showing that magic is not the prerogative of non-Western societies," but also provides "a classic and apt example of how ethnocentrism can color one's thinking."

The work was also featured in American Anthropologist.

== Awards and honors ==
- Decorated Legion of Merit, Bronze Star
- 1950 Fulbright Research Award
- Society Science Research Council Fellow, 1936–37
- Recipient Social Science Research Council Demobilization award, 1945
- Horace Rackham grant for field research Algeria, 1950
- Ford Foundation grantee, 1956; Rockefeller Foundation grantee, Nigeria, 1957–58
- Election to the American Philosophical Society, 1966
- National Science Foundation grant for research Nigeria, 1970-71
