= Covert Warfare =

18 volume nonfiction text

Covert Warfare: Intelligence, Counterintelligence and Military Deception During the World War II Era
- Author: John Mendelsohn
- Language: English
- Genre: Non-fiction
- Publisher: Garland Publishing
- Published: 1989
- No. of books: 18

Covert Warfare: Intelligence, Counterintelligence and Military Deception During the World War II Era is an eighteen volume book edited by John Mendelsohn and published in 1989 by Garland.

The series contains sanitized versions of selected previously classified documents from the National Archives record groups.

- Library of Congress Classification: D810.S7 (D810S7C66)
- Dewey Decimal Classification: 940.5485

== Volumes ==
1. Mulligan, Timothy (March 1989). Ultra, Magic, and the Allies. introduction by Timothy Mulligan. ISBN 978-0-8240-7950-5.
2. The spy factory and secret intelligence. introduction by Bradley F. Smith. March 1989. ISBN 978-0-8240-7951-2.
3. Smith, Bradley F. (March 1989). OSS Jedburgh teams, 1. introduction by Bradley F. Smith. ISBN 978-0-8240-7952-9.
4. OSS Jedburgh teams, 2. introduction by Bradley F. Smith. 1989. ISBN 978-0-8240-7953-6.
5. Other OSS teams. introduction by Bradley F. Smith. 1989. ISBN 978-0-8240-7954-3.
6. Mendelsohn, John (March 1989). German Radio Intelligence and the Soldatensender. ISBN 978-0-8240-7955-0.
7. The case of Richard Sorge. introduction by Bryan T. Van Sweringen. 1989. ISBN 978-0-8240-7956-7.
8. The OSS-NKVD relationship, 1943 - 1945. introduction by J. Dane Hartgrove. March 1989. ISBN 978-0-8240-7957-4.
9. Scientific and technical intelligence gathering. introduction by George C. Chalou. ISBN 978-0-8240-7958-1.
10. Mendelsohn, John (1989). Covert war in Latin America. introduction by Sally McCarthy Marks. ISBN 978-0-8240-7959-8.
11. The History of the Counter Intelligence Corps (CIC). ISBN 978-0-8240-7960-4.
12. Chalou, George C. (1989). The Counter Intelligence Corps in action. introduction by George C. Chalou. ISBN 978-0-8240-7961-1.
13. Kahn, David (March 1989). The final solution of the Abwehr. ISBN 978-0-8240-7962-8.
14. A man called A. H.. 1989. ISBN 978-0-8240-7963-5.
15. Basic deception and the Normandy invasion. introduction by Harold C. Deutsch. 1989. ISBN 978-0-8240-7964-2.
16. From Normandy into the Reich. introduction by Edwin R. Coffee. 1989. ISBN 978-0-8240-7965-9.
17. The German view of cover and deception. 1989. ISBN 978-0-8240-7966-6.
18. Cover and deception by the Royal Air Force in World War II. introduction by Robin E. Cookson. 1989. ISBN 978-0-8240-7967-3.
