= Marlborough Churchill =

United States Army general

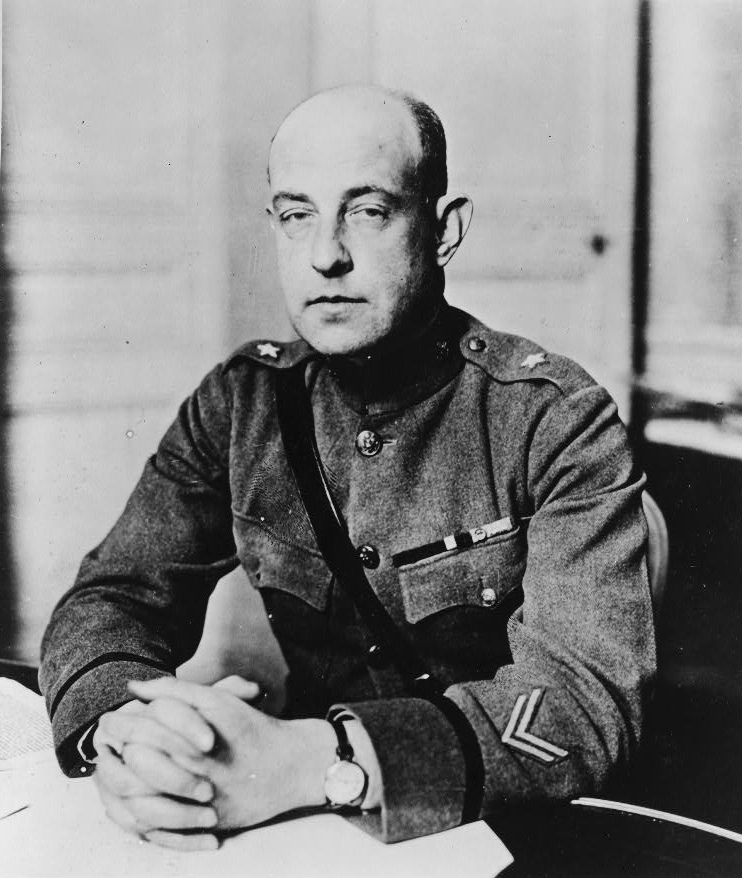
- Marlborough Churchill c. 1918
- Born: August 11, 1878; Andover, Massachusetts, United States
- Died: July 9, 1947 (aged 68); New York City, New York, United States
- Burial place: Arlington National Cemetery, Virginia, United States
- Education: Harvard University
- Military career
- Allegiance: United States
- Branch: United States Army
- Service years: 1901–1924
- Rank: Brigadier General
- Unit: Field Artillery Branch

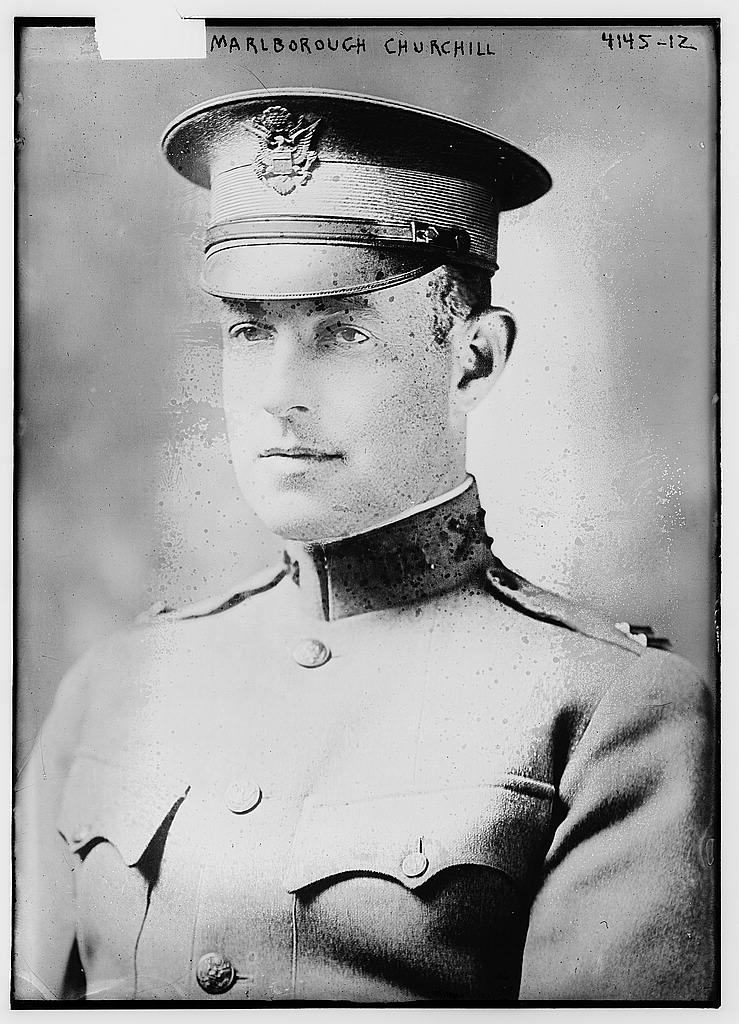
Churchill

Marlborough Churchill (August 11, 1878 – July 9, 1947) was a U.S. Army officer. Together with Herbert Yardley, he was instrumental in establishing the joint U.S. Department of State and Department of War's cryptanalytic group, called the Black Chamber.

== Early life and education ==
He was born on August 11, 1878, in Andover, Massachusetts, a son of Professor John Wesley Churchill of Andover Theological Seminary and Mary (Cooper) Churchill. Churchill graduated from Phillips Academy in 1896 and then attended Harvard University, graduating in 1900.

== Military career ==
He was commissioned in the Field Artillery Branch on 17 September 1901 with date of rank 1 July 1901. He was promoted to first lieutenant on 25 January 1907 and to captain on April 13, 1911. He was promoted to major on May 15, 1917. On June 12, 1918, he was promoted to colonel in the National Army. On August 8, 1918, he was promoted to brigadier general.

In 1917, Churchill served on the general staff of the American Expeditionary Force in France. On 5 June 1918, Brigadier General Churchill succeeded Ralph Van Deman as head of the Military Intelligence Branch of the War Department, where he remained until 19 August 1920. In this capacity, Churchill advocated in December 1918 that MI-8, Cipher Bureau, then headed by Herbert Yardley, continue to do its cryptanalyic work after World War I. He was awarded the Distinguished Service Medal for his service during World War I.

He was discharged as brigadier general on 30 June 1920 and reverted to the rank of major. He retired from the U.S. Army for disability in the line of duty with the rank of lieutenant colonel on 16 January 1924.

== Awards ==
He received the Army Distinguished Service Medal. The citation for the medal reads:

The President of the United States of America, authorized by Act of Congress, July 9, 1918, takes pleasure in presenting the Army Distinguished Service Medal to Brigadier General Marlborough Churchill, United States Army, for exceptionally meritorious and distinguished services to the Government of the United States, in a duty of great responsibility during World War I as Chief of Staff of the Army Artillery of the 1st Army, American Expeditionary Forces, and for his ability, zeal, and untiring energy in building up the Military Intelligence Division of the General Staff as Director of Military Intelligence. General Churchill discharged these duties of great responsibility with ability, tact, and energy. He built up the Intelligence Service to its present high state of efficiency.

His other decorations included Order of the Bath, officer of the Legion of Honor, commander of the Order of the Crown of Italy, and commander of the Order of Leopold.

== Personal life ==
He married Mary Smith on October 7, 1904.

== Death and legacy ==
He died on July 9, 1947, in Manhattan, New York City. He is buried in Arlington National Cemetery.

Churchill is a member of the Military Intelligence Hall of Fame.

== Bibliography ==
- Davis, Henry Blaine Jr. (1998). Generals in Khaki. Raleigh, North Carolina: Pentland Press. ISBN 1571970886. OCLC 40298151.
- Venzon, Anne Cipriano (2013). The United States in the First World War: an Encyclopedia. Hoboken, NJ: Taylor and Francis. ISBN 978-1-135-68453-2. OCLC 865332376.
