= CICS (disambiguation) =

CICS is the Customer Information Control System, a transaction server that runs primarily on IBM mainframes.

CICS may also refer to:

- Canadian Intergovernmental Conference Secretariat
- CICS, the Center for Information Convergence and Strategy, San Diego State University, California, USA
- CICS-FM, a Canadian radio station
- Chicago International Charter School, Illinois, United States
- the CICS-ICCS, International Catholic Conference of Scouting (CICS, Conférence Internationale du Scoutisme Catholique), Rome, Italia

== See also ==
- CIC (disambiguation)
