= William L. Uanna =

American security expert (1909–1961)

William Lewis Uanna
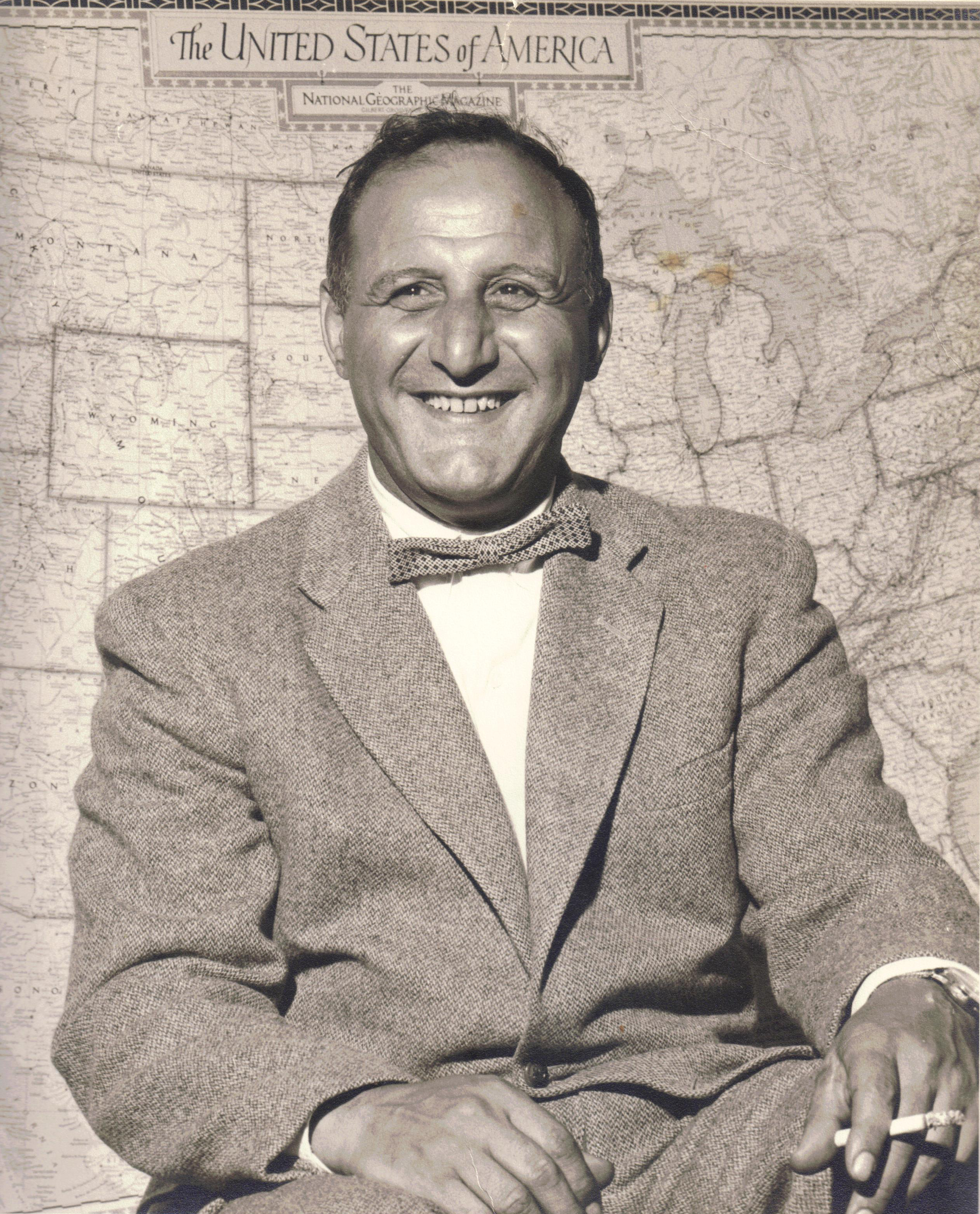
- Uanna in 1957
- Born: May 13, 1909; Medford, Massachusetts, US
- Died: December 22, 1961 (aged 52); Addis Ababa, Ethiopia
- Burial place: Arlington National Cemetery
- Alma mater: Tufts University (BA, MA); Suffolk University (LLB)
- Spouse: Bonnie Leonard
- Military career
- Allegiance: United States
- Branch: United States Army
- Service years: 1941–1947
- Rank: Major
- Service number: O-1107189
- Commands: 1st Technical Service Detachment
- Conflicts: World War II: Bombing of Hiroshima and Nagasaki; Occupation of Japan
- Other work: Chief of Central Personnel Clearance at the Atomic Energy Commission; The Assistant Area Engineer at the Armed Forces Special Weapons Project; Intelligence Specialist at the Central Intelligence Agency; Special assistant to the Secretary of Commerce; Chief of the Division of Physical Security, Department of State

William Lewis "Bud" Uanna (May 13, 1909 – December 22, 1961) was an American security expert, who gained prominence as a security officer with the Manhattan Project, which built the first atomic bomb during World War II.

Uanna was in charge of security at the project's facility at Oak Ridge, Tennessee, and later at the 509th Composite Group, which dropped atomic bombs on Hiroshima and Nagasaki.

After the war, he headed the Atomic Energy Commission (AEC) program to provide security clearances to its personnel, and developed the top-secret Q clearance. He later served as chief of physical security at the State Department.

== Education and military career ==
William Lewis Uanna was born in Medford, Massachusetts, on May 13, 1909, the son of Italian immigrants Anthony Uanna and Theresa née Ferullo. He attended Medford High School, and then Tufts College on an athletic scholarship, where he was a halfback on the college football team, and an intercollegiate wrestling champion, earning a degree in engineering. He soon returned to Tufts and got a M.A. in education.

Uanna worked for private companies as well as the US Army Corps of Engineers. As a civilian with the Corps of Engineers he was involved in the construction of Grenier Army Air Field in New Hampshire and Fort Devens in Massachusetts, where he later served as an Army Counter Intelligence agent during World War II. Between 1938 and 1942 he attended Suffolk University, graduating with an L.L.B. He then passed the Massachusetts Bar examination and was admitted to practice before the Federal Bar. Between 1949 and 1954 he attended the American University in Washington, D.C.

Enlisting in the U.S. Army on May 28, 1941, Uanna was assigned to the Corps of Intelligence Police (CIP), later renamed the Counter Intelligence Corps (CIC). He attended the Officer Candidate School at Fort Belvoir, and in 1942 and was commissioned as a second lieutenant in the Army Corps of Engineers. He was assigned to the CIC as Director of Operations of I Service Command, responsible for five field offices and between 300 and 400 Special Agents, who dealt with subversion, espionage, plant security, sabotage, water front security and personnel investigations.

In February 1943, Uanna was posted to X Corps, then based at Sherman, Texas, where he was responsible for setting up the first intelligence units assigned to combat formations in the United States. With 112 officers and 35 agents he conducted investigations and evaluated the loyalty of individuals within X Corps and trained its troops in security procedures. In August 1943, Uanna became an instructor at the CIC school in Chicago.

== Manhattan Project security ==
Joining the Manhattan Project in late 1943, Uanna was initially assigned to the New England area, where he looked after security at 150 organizations, including key contractors Stone & Webster, General Electric, Westinghouse and American Cyanamid, and universities such as Harvard, Brown, Yale and MIT. He was promoted to first lieutenant on July 25, 1943, captain on March 25, 1944, and ultimately major on June 25, 1945. In August 1944, he was appointed Security Officer for the large town and industrial installation built by the US Government at Oak Ridge, Tennessee, to enrich uranium for an atomic bomb. As such, he oversaw the physical security of the site, and was responsible for the security clearance of over 50,000 personnel. He supervised the activities of the town's police, detectives and welfare bureau and provided security for the transport of fissile materials from Oak Ridge to the weapons laboratory at Los Alamos, New Mexico.

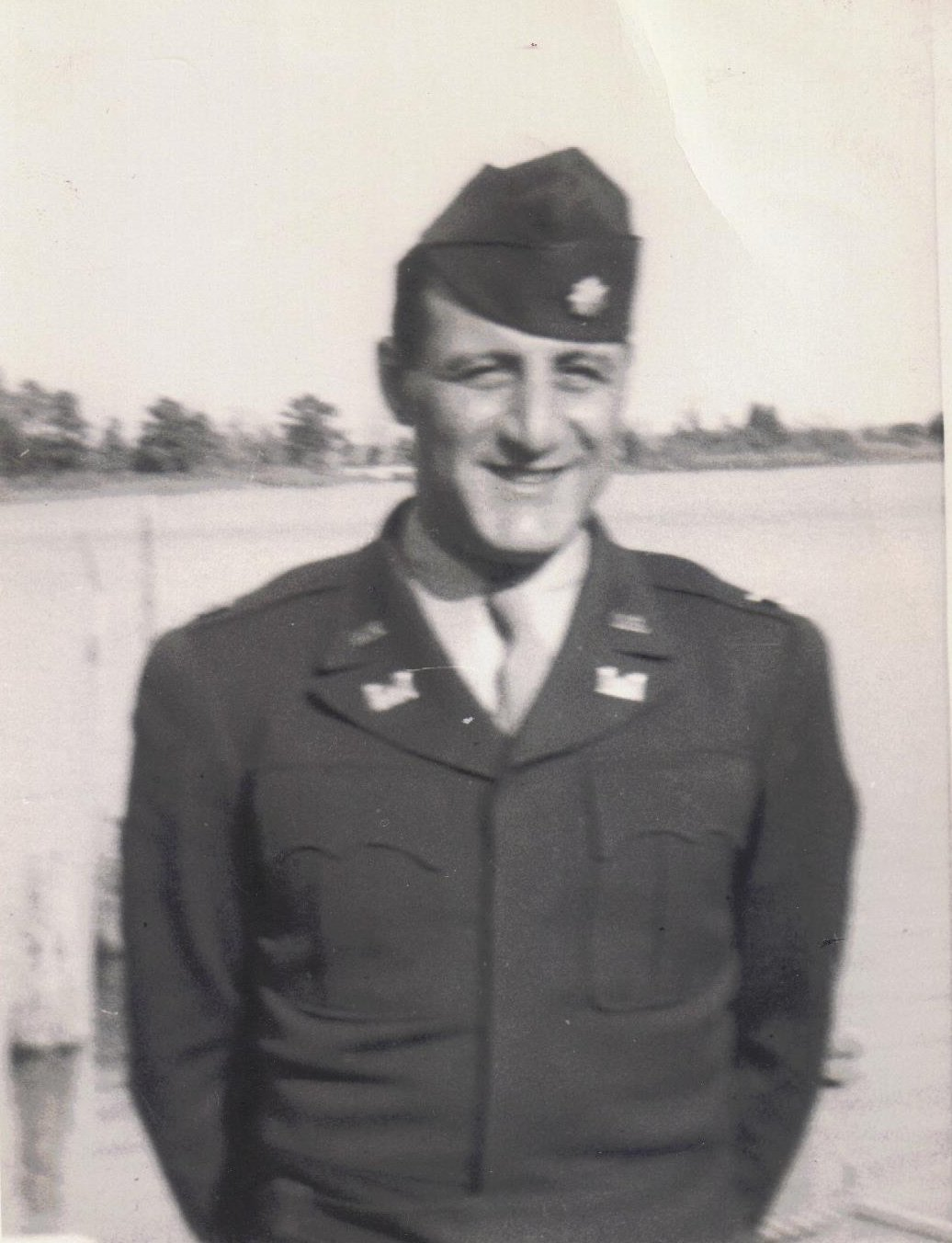
Uanna on Tinian Island 1945

In February 1945, Uanna assumed command of the 1st Technical Service Detachment, which was attached to the 509th Composite Group, the Army Air Force unit created to deliver the first atomic bomb. He became responsible for the security clearance of its personnel. Uanna arrived with orders from Lieutenant Colonel John Lansdale Jr., the Manhattan Project's head of security, and a briefcase containing dossiers on members of the 393d Bomb Squadron, the combat element of the 509th Composite Group. Uanna had particular concerns about Captain Claude Eatherly. The dossier indicated that Eatherly was a gambler, with an "emotional problem". The commander of the 509th Composite Group, Lieutenant Colonel Paul W. Tibbets Jr., opted to keep Eatherly, based on his piloting skills. Background checks on the 1st Ordnance Squadron revealed that it had several escaped convicts in its ranks. Uanna surmised that enlisting in the Army under false names was an easy way of escaping detection during wartime. Since skilled technicians were hard to find, Tibbets elected to keep them, threatening to send them back to prison for any dereliction of duty or security breaches.

Uanna oversaw the movement of the 509th from its training base in Wendover Army Air Field, Utah to Tinian Island in the Western Pacific, travelling by air with the Project Alberta advance party of 34 in a Douglas C-54 Skymaster "Green Hornet" of the 320th Troop Carrier Squadron. In his book Project Alberta, Harlow Russ, a civilian scientist with Project Alberta who was part of the Fat Man bomb assembly team, recounts that during the flight he asked Uanna why all the military people on the plane were armed, and Uanna informed him that while the islands that they were stopping at were held by US forces, they would be flying over or close to other islands that were still occupied by the Japanese. Because of the remote chance that they might be engaged by Japanese aircraft or anti-aircraft guns, they flew over these islands at night.

On Tinian, Uanna was in charge of the physical security of its installations, and supervised the unloading and installation of its stores and equipment. At one point Russ left his shirt on the line over night, and it disappeared. He mentioned this to Uanna "who seemed to know everything", and he told Russ that it had most likely been taken by one of the Japanese soldiers holding out in caves and tunnels on Tinian, who made periodic raids in search of food. Uanna thought that one was responsible for an outbreak of diarrhea in the 509th Composite Group. Security around the cookhouse was increased, and the outbreak did not recur.

Uanna also looked after security at other bases that might be used by the 509th in an emergency, such as Iwo Jima. He supervised the loading of the Little Boy bomb into the Enola Gay, and during the bombing of Hiroshima on August 6, 1945, he was in charge of a communications center on Iwo Jima that relayed messages back to Tinian. He was therefore one of the first people to know that Hiroshima was the target, and that it had been attacked. After the subsequent unconditional surrender of Japan, he accompanied the Manhattan Project team sent to survey the damage, spending four weeks in Nagasaki.

== Postwar career ==
Uanna returned to the United States in October 1945, and was discharged from the Army in April 1946. He returned to Boston, where he was admitted to the bar in 1946, and practiced law and engineering, but was recalled to active duty in October 1946 to conduct an investigation into reports that servicemen had tried to sell pictures of the atomic bomb to The Baltimore Sun. These turned out to be pictures of the dummy bombs used for drop tests. In 1947, he was chosen by the newly created Atomic Energy Commission (AEC) in Washington, D.C. to head its program to provide security clearances to its personnel, a requirement of the Atomic Energy Act of 1946. At this time he developed the criteria for the AEC's Q clearance. He married Bonnie Louise Leonard on August 29, 1947. They had a son, Stephen Lee.

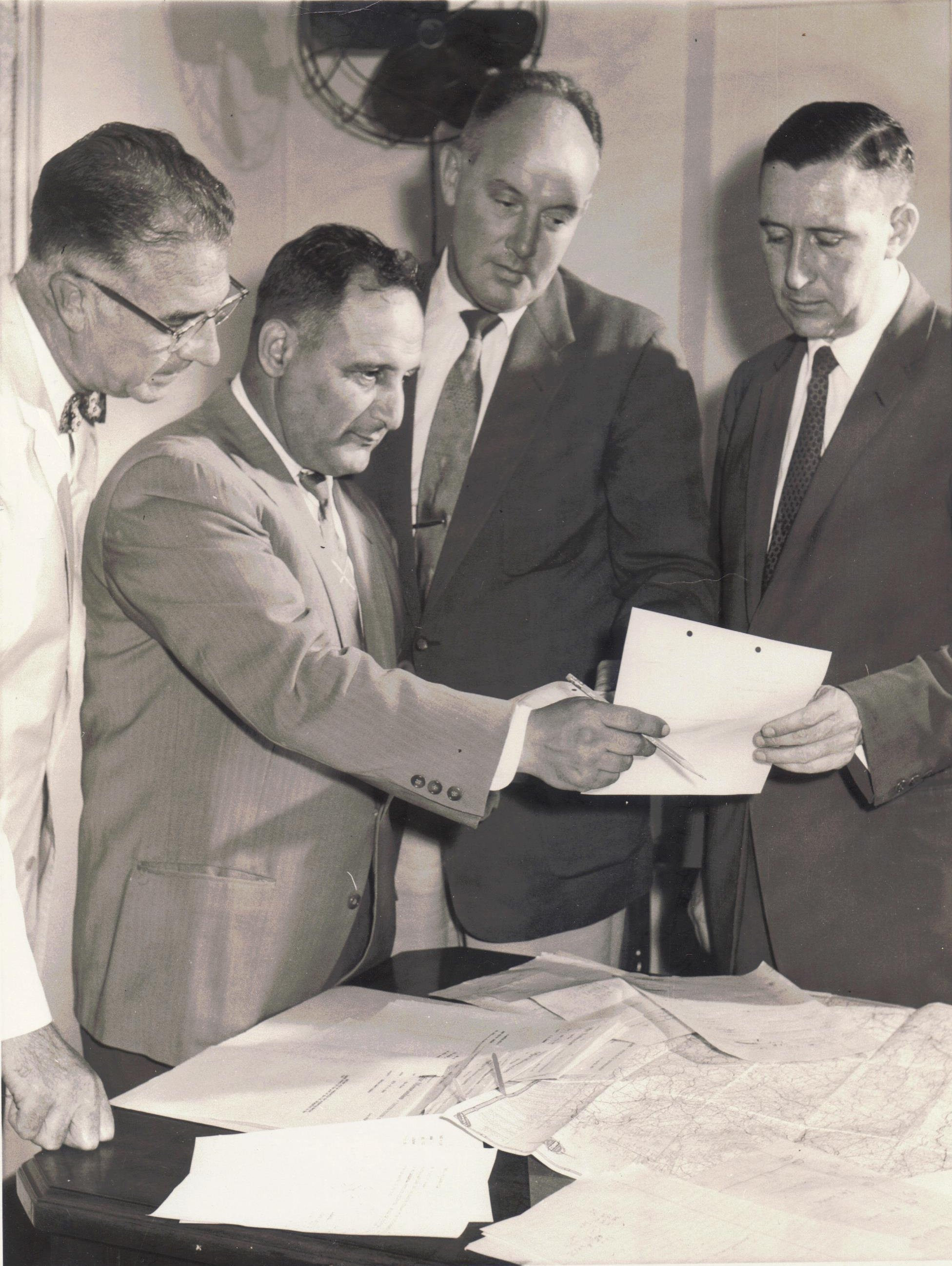
Uanna (second from left) with colleagues at the State Department 1958

In 1948 Uanna became second-in-command of an Armed Forces Special Weapons Project (AFSWP) construction program to build storage bases for atomic weapons. As the highest ranking civilian on the project he was responsible for over $100 million of works. The Federal Bureau of Investigation (FBI) sought to continue the relationship they had developed at the Atomic Energy Commission where internal FBI memos described Uanna as the "main source of confidential information within the AEC."

From 1949 to 1951, Uanna worked as an Intelligence Specialist at the newly established Central Intelligence Agency (CIA), where he wrote the Office of Policy Coordination's (OPC) briefing manual. The OPC was the covert action branch of the US intelligence community and at this time was overseen jointly by the State Department and the Department of Defense, rather than by the Director of Central Intelligence.

From 1951 to 1953, Uanna was the special assistant to the Secretary of Commerce as Chief of the Facilities Protection Board, and was a staff member of the Industrial Evaluations Board. These boards were overseen by the Interdepartmental Committee on Internal Security (ICIS) and the National Security Resources Board (NSRB). The NSRB was charged with developing security programs for industry and several were developed jointly with representatives from the power, transportation, explosives, petroleum, and communications industries. Since he was directly responsible to the Secretary of Commerce, after the Republican Administration took office in 1953, Uanna found himself without a job.

After this, Uanna accepted a temporary assignment at the Department of State as Otto Otepka's assistant. Otepka was in charge of State's Evaluations Division. Amidst allegations from Senator Joseph McCarthy about the presence of Communist sympathizers in the Army and State Department, Uanna's expertise in countering subversion won him the position. Using procedures he had developed at the AEC, Uanna wrote the Evaluators Handbook that would be used by State Department investigators to review the loyalty and "suitability" of employees in accordance with Executive Order 10450 and Executive Order 10501.

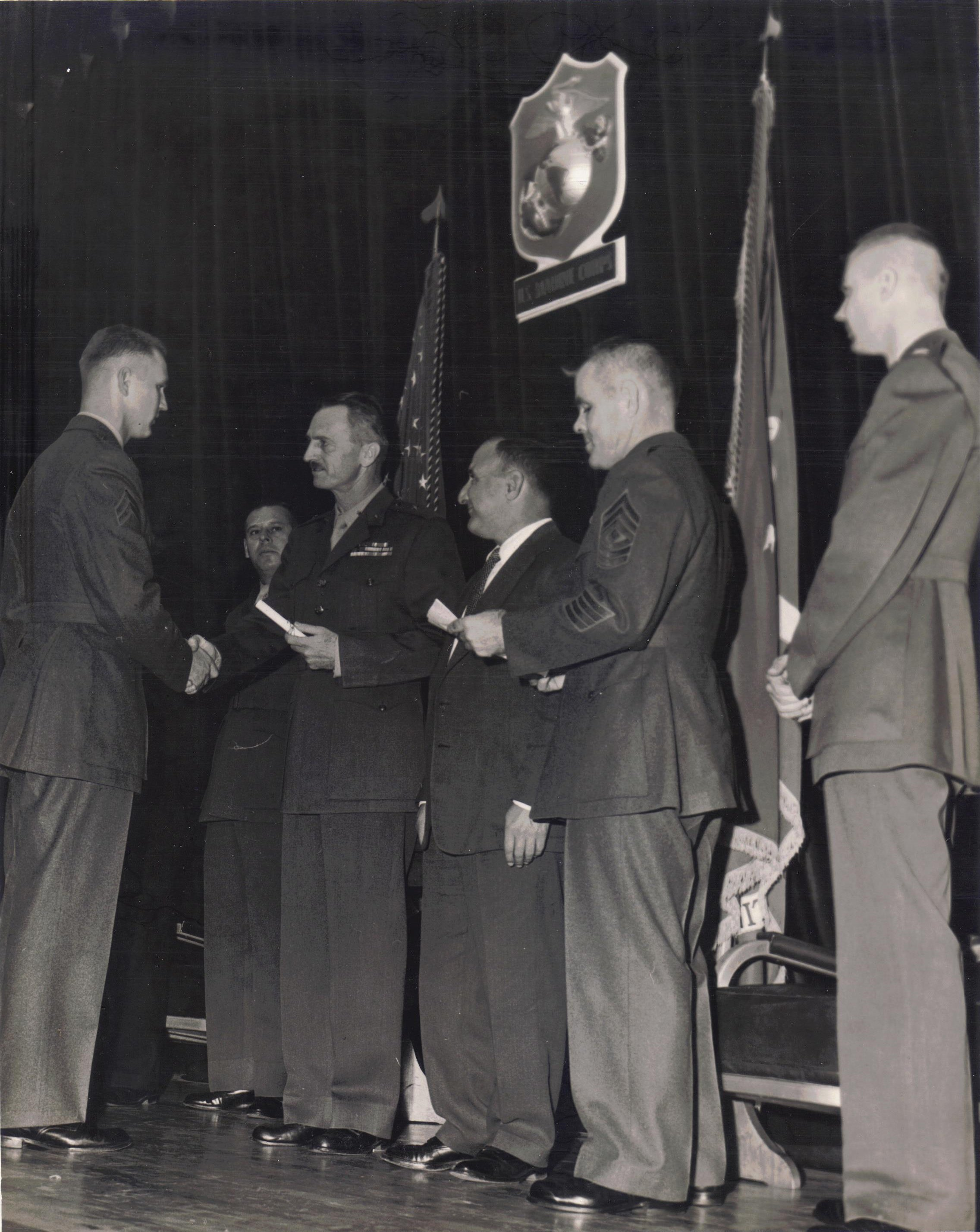
Uanna (third from right) at Marine Security Guard Graduation, c. 1958

In 1953 the State Department's physical security was split between foreign and domestic branches. Uanna reorganized these into one group called the Division of Physical Security, consisting of four branches, and took over as its new chief. He then published the Protection of Dignitaries Manual and developed the handbook used at the training school for Marine Security Guards assigned to U. S. embassies, legations and consulates overseas. As Chief of the Division, Uanna was responsible for the security of all State's personnel and facilities in the United States and abroad. He was responsible for the security for Queen Elizabeth II and Prince Philip's visit to the United States in 1957.

Dulles became ill in late 1958 and was replaced by Christian Herter, after which Uanna was posted overseas to Addis Ababa, Ethiopia, as an administrative officer at the U.S. Embassy. He was also the State Department liaison with the U.S. Department of Defense. He returned to the United States briefly to handle Nikita Khrushchev's state visit in 1959.

While on assignment, Uanna died of a heart attack in the office of the Air Attache at the U.S. Embassy in Addis Ababa on December 22, 1961. He was buried in Arlington National Cemetery. He was survived by his wife Bonnie née Leonard, who died on October 25, 1992, and his son Steven Lee.

== Film portrayals ==
Uanna was portrayed by James Whitmore in the 1952 motion picture Above and Beyond. Lawrence H. Suid noted that Whitmore's Uanna "seems to be a fictional character, a cinematic creation who always seems to know the right answers, to do the right thing". Whitmore wanted to meet Uanna, but was unable to do so. Uanna has also been portrayed by Stephen Macht in the 1980 TV movie Enola Gay: The Men, the Mission, the Atomic Bomb and Minor Mustain in the 1995 Japanese/Canadian film Hiroshima.
