= Above and Beyond (1952 film) =

1952 film by Melvin Frank and Norman Panama

- Theatrical release poster
- Directed by: Melvin Frank; Norman Panama
- Screenplay by: Melvin Frank; Norman Panama; Beirne Lay Jr.
- Story by: Beirne Lay Jr.
- Produced by: Melvin Frank; Norman Panama
- Starring: Robert Taylor; Eleanor Parker; James Whitmore
- Cinematography: Ray June
- Edited by: Cotton Warburton
- Music by: Hugo Friedhofer
- Production company: Metro-Goldwyn-Mayer
- Distributed by: Loew's Inc.
- Release dates: December 25, 1952; January 8, 1953 (Los Angeles); January 30, 1953 (New York)
- Running time: 122 minutes
- Country: United States
- Language: English
- Budget: $1,397,000
- Box office: $3,980,000

Above and Beyond is a 1952 American World War II docudrama film directed by Melvin Frank and Norman Panama about Lt. Col. Paul W. Tibbets Jr., the pilot of the aircraft that dropped the atomic bomb on Hiroshima in August 1945. The film stars Robert Taylor as Tibbets and features a love story with Eleanor Parker as his wife.

== Plot ==
Col. Paul W. Tibbets Jr. is assigned to a dangerous mission testing a new bomber, the Boeing B-29 Superfortress. The perilous assignment has caused his wife Lucy to worry for his life and whether their marriage can survive the constant separations.

After a year of scrutiny, Maj. Gen. Vernon C. Brent, who championed Tibbets as a test pilot, selects him to lead a new unit in the Pacific war flying the B-29, armed with a new secret weapon. Scientists of the Manhattan Project explain their secret weapon, the atomic bomb. Along with Maj. Bill Uanna, the only other person who knows what the mission will entail, Tibbets is expected to keep strict discipline over the personnel assigned to a B-29 conversion unit at Wendover Field, Utah. When families of crew members are brought to Wendover, tensions erupt between the Tibbetses over his secrecy concerning the mission.

The B-29 designated for the Hiroshima bombing is named the Enola Gay and is flown to the Pacific island base of Tinian. After the bomb is dropped, Tibbets realizes the devastation that the bomb has caused as he sees the flash, feels the subsequent pressure wave, and sees the burning city. Back on Tinian, the crew is mobbed and although a second mission is mounted, it proves unnecessary with the end of the war after the bombing of Nagasaki. Tibbets returns home, flying first to Washington, where he has a joyous reunion with his wife.

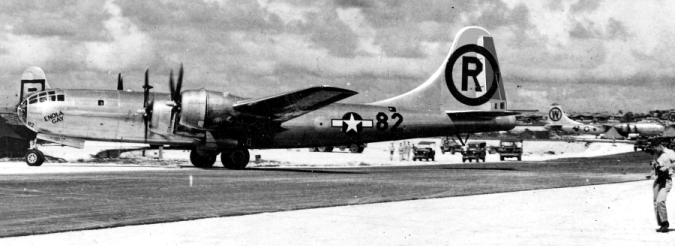
The Enola Gay entering the hardstand at Tinian after the Hiroshima bombing.

== Cast ==
- Robert Taylor as Colonel Paul W. Tibbets
- Eleanor Parker as Lucy Tibbets
- James Whitmore as Major Bill Uanna
- Larry Keating as Major General Vernon C. Brent
- Larry Gates as Captain William "Deak"' Parsons
- Marilyn Erskine as Marge Bratton
- Stephen Dunne as Major Harry Bratton
- Robert Burton as Brigadier General Samuel E. Roberts
- Hayden Rorke as Dr. Norman Ramsey
- Lawrence Dobkin as Dr. Van Dyke
- Jim Backus as Major General Curtis E. LeMay
- Christopher Olsen as Paul Tibbets Jr.
- Sidney and Ernest Sittig as Baby Tibbets

== Production ==
The film was suggested by screenwriter Beirne Lay Jr., a colonel in the Air Force Reserve, to General Curtis LeMay, commander of the Strategic Air Command (SAC). The men had previously discussed the high rate of divorce among flight crews and felt that a film depicting the problem might help raise morale.

Lay suggested a film based on the experiences of Colonel Paul Tibbets, commander of the 509th Composite Group during World War II. LeMay approved, and after writing an outline, Lay transferred scriptwriting duties to Melvin Frank and Norman Panama. Although Tibbets lent his full approval and support to the film, he felt that he was too closely involved to be objective and suggested Lt. Col. Charles F.H. Begg, commander of the nuclear-ordnance squadron, and Charles Sweeney, pilot of the Nagasaki bombing, as technical advisors. Begg, Major Norman W. Ray and Major James B. Bean served as USAF technical advisors.

The film was originally titled Eagle on His Cap. Studio principal photography began on February 5, 1952 before transferring to Davis–Monthan Air Force Base, which was predominantly utilized for the airfield scenes at Wendover Air Force Base, Boeing's Wichita testing area and Tinian. The production wrapped on March 26, 1952.

For dramatic effect, some incidents were somewhat exaggerated, such as the scene in which the Hiroshima bomb is armed mid-flight. The filmmakers added some turbulence to increase tension, although the actual flight was perfectly smooth throughout. In addition, the entire mission is depicted in daylight, although the actual takeoff from Tinian was in full darkness at 2:45 a.m. However, the scene in which Tibbets' wife summons a nuclear scientist from Los Alamos to repair a drain, believing him to be a janitor, is accurate.

Coproducer Norman Panama claimed that the system that he and Melvin Frank implemented for The Reformer and the Redhead (1950) by which all shots and dialogue were precisely planned and diagrammed, with suggestions welcomed from the cast and crew, saved $76,000 per day of production.

A sequel film focusing on the worries faced by wives of military aviators was contemplated but never materialized.

== Release ==
Robert Taylor urged MGM to allow him to promote the film on television, and he appeared with Paul Tibbets on Ed Sullivan's Toast of the Town show, an unusual step at a time when the major studios disapproved of its stars appearing on television, which they saw as a threat. Although the studio was hesitant about the television appearance, the publicity gained was important to the film's initial success.

== Reception ==
In a contemporary review for The New York Times, critic Bosley Crowther wrote:

So long as attention is directed to the strictly technical activities of preparing for and delivering the mysterious atomic bomb, this tediously long and earnest picture has substance and plausibility ... But the long-drawn and intimate attention that the script writers and the picture give to the heartthrobs of Colonel and Mrs. Tibbets is a bit on the ostentatious side. Not only is it directed to make a lot out of ordinary things, such as the normal discomforts of a family at an Air Force base during the war, but it is carried beyond practical reason in ripping the couple apart. Although it is generously planted that they are rapturously in love, it is also assumed that they would split up over the colonel's deep absorption in his job.

Critic Edwin Schallert of the Los Angeles Times, despite praising Tibbets as "a courageous individual who had a great respect for other men's lives", wrote:

"Above and Beyond" might be charged with being too long, because it exceeds a full two hours by a couple of minutes. Shorter, it would have been somewhat more acceptable for the general public. However, for those who are interested in a well-documented feature with human interest, this screen event is unique.

According to MGM records, the film earned $2,647,000 in the U.S. and Canada and $1,333,000 overseas, resulting in a profit of $1,037,000.

== Awards ==
Above and Beyond was nominated for two Academy Awards: Best Original Motion Picture Story for Beirne Lay Jr. and Best Scoring of a Dramatic Picture for Hugo Friedhofer.
