= Commission for the Implementation of the Constitution (Kenya) =

The constitution of Kenya approved by parliament unanimously on 1 April 2010 led to the formation of a Commission for the Implementation of the Constitution.

This commission was mandated to facilitate in the implementation process of the new constitution by monitoring it progress as well as note and report any hindrances in the implementations of the new constitution, and to promote constitutionalism among others.
