= Certified Insurance Counselor =

In the United States, Certified Insurance Counselor (CIC) is an insurance agent professional certification designation. The CIC certification program was started by the National Alliance for Insurance Education & Research in Austin, Texas in 1969. Some CIC courses can be used to fulfill state continuing education requirements for licensing as an insurance agent.

The CIC program is for agency owners, producers, agents, brokers, and agency and company personnel. To be eligible to attend CIC institutes and obtain the CIC designation, an individual must:

- be a licensed agent, broker, adjuster, or solicitor, or
- have at least two years of full-time experience in the insurance industry or as a risk management practitioner, or
- have served as a full-time insurance faculty member at an accredited college or university

As of December 2012, there were 30,986 active CIC designees.

== Five institutes ==
There are seven* CIC institutes. Each institute is 2 days of coursework (16 hours total), followed by a 2-hour essay exam that is required only if obtaining the designation. The CIC program is a continuing education program and a professional certification program. Any eligible individual may attend classes without taking the examinations or working toward the designation. Courses reflect the laws and regulations in the state in which the institute is held.

1. Personal lines institute addresses the insurance needs of individuals, families, and family members, and explains the complexities of state-specific personal lines forms.
2. Commercial casualty institute covers Commercial General Liability, Inland Marine, Ocean Marine, Business Auto, Commercial Umbrella/Excess Liability coverages.
3. Commercial property institute covers ways to maximize coverage for various types of commercial property accounts.
4. Life and health institute provides the basic, essential background knowledge for property and casualty agents to succeed in the life and health insurance market.
5. Agency management institute covers the internal operations and factors necessary to run an agency. A case study is used throughout the program for practical application of the theories, methods, and procedures.
6. Commercial Multiline covers Commercial Inland Marine Concepts & Coverages, Crime Coverages & Endorsements, Cyber Exposures and Coverages, Employment Practices Liability Insurance, Excess Liability/Commercial Umbrella Coverages
7. Company Operations covers Executive Strategies, Regulation & Compliance, Actuarial Practices & Accounting, Product Development, Agency/Policyholder Services, Underwriting, and Claims

To become a designated CIC, the candidate must complete all five courses and pass the examinations within five calendar years. CIC designees make a commitment to update their CIC designations annually.

A CIC candidate may earn the CIC designation by completing any four CIC institutes plus one Certified Risk Managers (CRM) course. CIC and CRM designations can be earned by completing nine programs: any four of the CIC institutes and all five CRM courses (Principles of Risk Management, Analysis of Risk, Control of Risk, Financing of Risk, and Practice of Risk Management).
