= The History of the Counter Intelligence Corps =

The History of the Counter Intelligence Corps was a classified 30 volume book prepared in the late 1950s by Major Ann Bray and others at the United States Army Intelligence Center and printed in 1959. The document contains the history of the US Army's Counter Intelligence Corps (CIC) until 1950. A declassified (sanitized) version of the official history is now available to researchers at the National Archives and Records Administration (NARA).

Volume XXX of the book has been published by Hanlim University, Korea as US Counter Intelligence Corps (CIC - Korea) Archives.

An 18-part series of declassified documents edited by John Mendelsohn and titled Covert Warfare: Intelligence, counterintelligence, and military deception during the World War II era was published in 1989. Part 11 was also named The History of the Counter Intelligence Corps (CIC).

In December 2005 a single-volume condensed history based on declassified CIC documents was published by the army as In the Shadow of the Sphynx: A History of Army Counterintelligence.
