= SO10 =

Metropolitan Police covert unit

SO10 is the former designation of the London's Metropolitan Police's Covert Operations Group.

== History ==
The group's origins can be traced back to 1960, with the formation of what was known as the Criminal Investigation Branch, which later evolved and was merged into SO10 and the Public Order Unit. The group's original name referred to its Specialist Operations designation prior to restructuring of the Metropolitan Police, which saw it re- designated to the Specialist Crime Directorate as SCD10, though it is still colloquially referred to as SO10.

== Role ==
The group's role is to provide specially trained officers and resources for cases requiring covert policing and evidence gathering. It had responsibility for all undercover policing in London, particularly focusing on surveillance and relying on support from armed officers and specialist surveillance photography. Some of their most notable work is that in counter-terrorism operations, the most high profile of which led to the shooting of Brazilian Jean Charles de Menezes who was mistakenly identified as a suspected suicide bomber on 22 July 2005.

== Sources ==
- Etienne, Philip; Maynard, Martin (2001). The Infiltrators. Penguin Books. ISBN 0-14-029244-6.
