= Corps of Intelligence Police =

Former intelligence agency within the United States Army

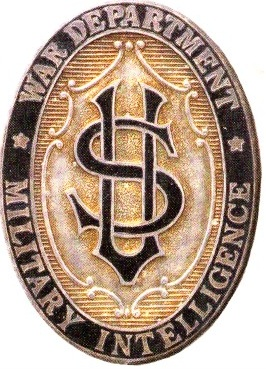
U.S. Army Corps of Intelligence Police Badge, ca. WWI

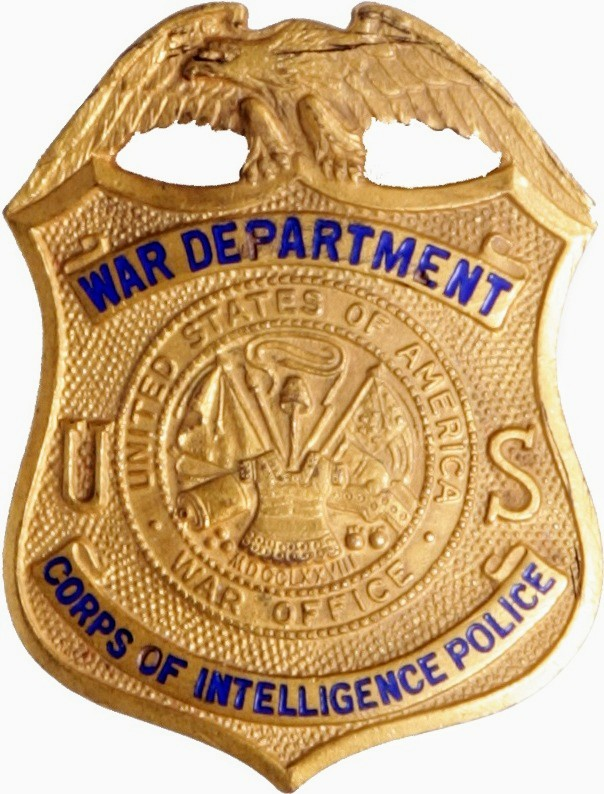
U.S. Army Corps of Intelligence Police Badge, post-WWI

The Corps of Intelligence Police (CIP), an intelligence and law enforcement agency within the United States Army, and the War Department, operated from 1917 to 1941. It was the predecessor of today's United States Army Counterintelligence.

Many of today's intelligence disciplines were deployed for the first time during World War I: aerial photography, signals intercept, interrogation teams, and counterintelligence agents—the latter of which drew the attention of Colonel Ralph Van Deman, Chief of the Military Intelligence Division of the War Department General Staff.

Van Deman founded the Corps of Intelligence Police to conduct undercover investigations of individuals and organizations. The Army was concerned about German spies and saboteurs. Van Deman was equally concerned about the loyalty of recent immigrants being drafted into service. He feared that the newly forming National Guard and National Army divisions might become “infested” with German agents and sympathizers. To protect the force, two soldiers within each company were appointed to secretly report on any suspicious activity, using the guidelines contained in a confidential pamphlet, “Provisional Counter-Espionage Instructions”.

After World War I, the CIP was shrunk and its budget cut until, by 1941, it had a staff of only 16. After the attack on Pearl Harbor, the CIP was reorganized, expanded, and renamed the Counter Intelligence Corps.

== See also ==
- Modern Day U.S. Army Counterintelligence (Special Agents)
- Historical U.S. Army Counterintelligence Corps
- The History of the Counter Intelligence Corps
