= Children in Crossfire =

- Formation: 1996
- Founder: Richard Moore
- Type: Non-profit
- Headquarters: 2 St Josephs Avenue, Derry. BT48 6TH
- Location: Northern Ireland
- Coordinates: 54.991483°N 7.325057°W
- Website: www.childrenincrossfire.org

Children in Crossfire is a registered charity founded in Northern Ireland which aims to eradicate poverty and help children in war zones and works in partnership with local organizations in the developing world to make healthcare and education more accessible to young children. Children in Crossfire is registered as a charity in Northern Ireland (NIC101412) and the Republic of Ireland (CHY 20045517). It is also a registered 501(c)(3) non-profit organization in the United States.

The charity has raised funds totaling over £25 million for causes in 10 countries including Malawi, The Gambia, and Ethiopia.

The headquarters of the Children in Crossfire is located in Derry.

== History ==
On May 4, 1972 during the Northern Ireland conflict ten year old Richard Moore was walking home from school past an army lookout post when a British soldier fired a rubber bullet from ten feet away blinding him for life. Despite the blindness Richard went on to complete school with a degree in Business Administration, and became an accomplished musician.

Feeling a lack of satisfaction in the mid-1990s, Moore felt the need to give back to the world and help other children who, like himself, had been "caught in the crossfire" of violence. In 1996 he realized this goal and began the Children in Crossfire charity with a mission to "combat the ravages of child poverty around the world."

In 2007, Moore was the subject of the BBC documentary titled Blind Vision in which he tracks down the soldier who originally shot him in order to offer his forgiveness. The two have become firm friends and give joint talks regarding the Gift of Reconciliation. In 2010, at the invitation of the Dalai Lama, they gave a talk in Dharamsala to an audience of over 2,500 people.

Children in Crossfire has been of interest to the Dalai Lama since its founding, and it has been described as "one of his favourite charities". Having met with Moore initially at a peace conference in Belfast, the Dalai Lama was invited to the 10th anniversary of the organization's founding in 2007. Upon his arrival, the Dalai Lama stated to Moore, "Richard I'm here, your friend, you're my hero." The Dalai Lama returned to Derry in September 2017 to celebrate the 20th anniversary of the NGO.

== Outreach ==
Since its 1996 inception Children in Crossfire has raised over $32.4 million to combat poverty in 10 countries. This money has gone to provide clean water to over one million people in Malawi, provide accessible education for visually-impaired students in The Gambia, treat over 2,000 cancer patients in Tanzania, and treat over 10,000 children suffering from severe acute malnutrition in Ethiopia. The charity has also given preschool access to over 100,000 children throughout Africa.
