= College of the Immaculate Conception =

College of the Immaculate Conception may refer to:

- College of the Immaculate Conception (Cabanatuan City), Nueva Ecija, Philippines
- College of the Immaculate Conception (New Orleans), New Orleans, Louisiana
- Saint Mary's College, Trinidad and Tobago, Trinidad and Tobago
- College of the Immaculate Conception (Enugu), Enugu (city), Nigeria
- College of the Immaculate Conception (Sligo), Sligo, Ireland
