= Ralph Van Deman =

United States Army general

Ralph Henry Van Deman
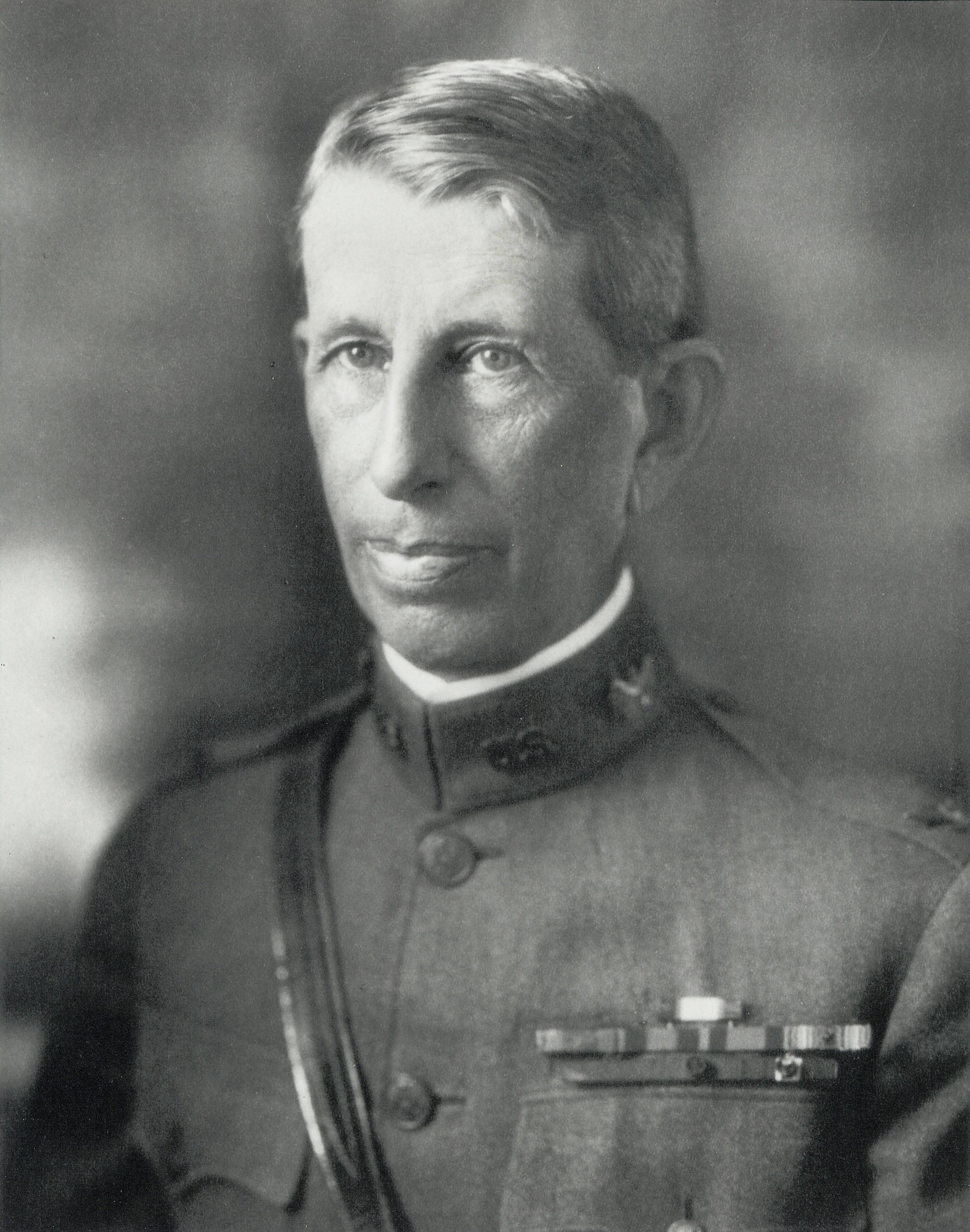
- Van Deman as a Colonel
- Born: September 3, 1865 (Note: U.S. Army records list his date of birth as September 3, 1865, but his grave marker at Fort Rosecrans National Cemetery gives his date of birth as September 13, 1865.); Delaware, Ohio
- Died: January 22, 1952 (aged 86); San Diego, California
- Burial place: Fort Rosecrans National Cemetery
- Alma mater: Harvard University (B.A.); Miami University (M.D.)
- Military career
- Allegiance: United States
- Branch: United States Army
- Service years: 1891 – 1929
- Rank: Major General
- Commands: Military Intelligence Section; 31st Infantry Regiment; 6th Infantry Brigade; 3rd Infantry Division
- Conflicts: Spanish–American War; Philippine–American War; World War I
- Awards: Distinguished Service Medal; Legion of Merit
- Other work: Consultant to War Department

Ralph Henry Van Deman (September 3, 1865 – January 22, 1952) was a United States Army officer, sometimes described as "the father of American military intelligence." He is in the Military Intelligence Hall of Fame.

== Early career ==
Van Deman was born in Delaware, Ohio, and graduated from Harvard in 1888. He was commissioned as a second lieutenant of infantry in 1891 after attending law school, and enrolling in medical school. He received his medical degree from the Miami Medical School in Cincinnati, Ohio in 1893.

Van Deman then entered the Army as a surgeon, before attending the Infantry and Cavalry School at Fort Leavenworth in early 1895. There he met Arthur L. Wagner who became head of the War Department's Military Information Division in 1896. In June 1897 Van Deman followed Wagner to Washington to work for MID.

== Military Intelligence Division ==
During the Spanish–American War Van Deman collected information on the military capabilities of Spain in Cuba, Puerto Rico and the Philippines and had charge of the White House war map. At the end of hostilities he went to Cuba and Puerto Rico to collect cartographic data. He was reassigned to the Philippines in April 1899 as aide to Brigadier General Robert Patterson Hughes. After two years he was promoted to captain and was moved to the Bureau of Insurgent Records in Manila, which he helped transform into the Philippine Military Information Division. He organized a counter-intelligence group using locally recruited agents. (See Philippine–American War).

He returned to the U.S. in late 1902, where he served as aide to the Commanding General, California, and then commanded Company B, 22nd Infantry, based at Fairbault, Minnesota. In 1904 he was one of nine officers selected for the first class of the Army War College (Another was John J. Pershing.) After graduation in 1906, he and Captain Alexander Coxe were sent on a covert mission to China to reconnoiter and map lines of communication around Peking. He returned to Washington in 1907 to become the Chief of the Mapping Section in the Second Division of the new General Staff.

In 1908 he began service under Major General Arthur MacArthur Jr., (father of Douglas MacArthur).

(On October 26, 1909, his wife became the first American woman to fly from American soil, being piloted by Wilbur Wright). He returned to the Philippines in 1910. There he resumed his project to map Chinese railways, roads and rivers until Japanese protests led to his expulsion in 1912.

== Re-formation of MID ==
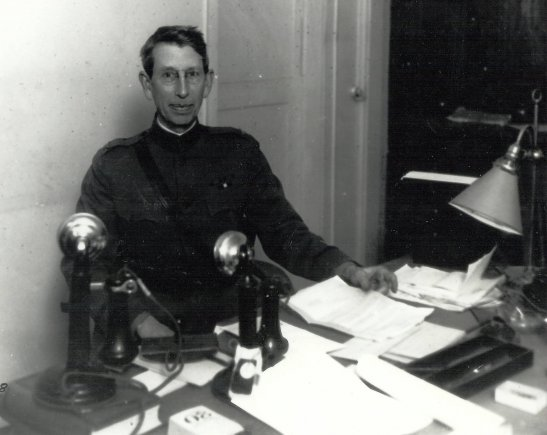
Van Deman as a General

Back in the United States he taught cartography, then became Inspector-General with the 2nd Division. Now a major, he returned to the War College Division in July 1915. He found that there was a general apathy about intelligence-gathering, and the MID had been downgraded from the second division of the General Staff, and merged with the third division, ending its separate identity. Van Deman wrote a history of MID detailing its beginnings in 1885, its rise in 1903, and fall in subsequent years. He was convinced that the Army must have a coordinated intelligence organization if it were to avoid defeat in the near future, especially as it was now obvious that the U.S. would soon be involved in the war in Europe. Eventually Van Deman was able to get an audience with the Secretary of War to present his case. There he convinced the War Department to accept his idea of an intelligence department for U.S. forces. A crucial role was played by Colonel Claude Dansey of the British Security Service in proposing similar ideas to Colonel Edward M. House, a member of an American liaison mission to Britain and one of President Wilson's advisors.

== World War I ==
As the result of these efforts the Military Intelligence Section, War College Division, War Department General Staff, was created on 3 May 1917, with Van Deman, now a colonel, at its head. His friend and colleague Alexander Coxe was the first officer appointed. By the war's end in 1919, it had grown to 282 officers and 1,159 civilians, most of them specialists. One of these was Herbert Yardley, a cipher clerk with the State Department who Van Deman made a first lieutenant and put in charge of codes and ciphers.

Van Deman modeled the new organization on British Army intelligence and similarly divided it into several departments:

- MI-1 – Administration
- MI-2 – Information
- MI-3 – Army Section (counterespionage)
- MI-4 – Foreign Influence (counterespionage within the civilian community)
- MI-5 – Military Attaches
- MI-6 – Translation
- MI-7 – Maps and Photographs
- MI-8 – Codes and Ciphers
- MI-9 – Combat Intelligence
- MI-10 – News (censorship)
- MI-11 – Travel (passport and port control)
- MI-12 – Fraud

As well as military intelligence gathering, MID was also tasked with preventing sabotage and subversion by enemy agents or German sympathizers on US soil. Short of manpower, Van Deman relied on private groups which he organized into the American Protective League. He also provided security to government offices, defense plants, seaports, and other sensitive installations. He created a field organization in eight US cities which employed mobilized civilian policemen to perform security investigations.

In France, MID provided operational intelligence to the American Expeditionary Force, and Van Deman created the Corps of Intelligence Police (forerunner of the Counter Intelligence Corps), recruiting fifty French-speaking Sergeants with police training. Thus, within a few months, he had created an intelligence organization that could support both domestic and tactical intelligence requirements.

== Post-war activities ==
In 1918 Van Deman went to France to work for Colonel Dennis Nolan, G2 of the AEF, handing over control of the MID to Brigadier-General Marlborough Churchill. After overseeing security at the Paris Peace Commission, he returned to Washington in August 1919 to briefly serve as Deputy Chief of the MID. In March 1920 he returned to the army and commanded the 31st Infantry in the Philippines. He also spent three months on detached service with the British Army in India.

He returned to the US and had a series of tours with the National Guard. He worked in the Washington headquarters of the Militia Bureau, then served as an instructor with the 159th Infantry Brigade in Berkeley, California. As a Brigadier-General he commanded the 6th Infantry Brigade at Fort Rosecrans, San Diego, California from 1927. He was promoted to Major-General in May 1929, and commanded the 3rd Infantry Division at Fort Lewis, Washington. He retired in September 1929 after 38 years of service.

After retiring he used the contacts he had established during World War I in the American Protective League to privately compile files on suspected subversives and foreign agents.

During World War II he acted as a consultant on intelligence matters to the War Department, for which he received a Legion of Merit. Notable among his recommendations was that he sent a passionate defense of Japanese-American citizens to President Roosevelt; the advice that they were not a threat was, however, ignored (leading to the Japanese American internment).

Van Deman Street, located within the former Fort Holabird in Baltimore, MD; is named after him in honor of his service in Military Intelligence.

On January 22, 1952, at the age of 86, he died in his home in San Diego.

== Awards ==
- Distinguished Service Medal
- Legion of Merit
- Spanish War Service Medal
- Philippine Campaign Medal
- World War I Victory Medal

=== Distinguished Service Medal citation ===
The President of the United States of America, authorized by Act of Congress, July 9, 1918, takes pleasure in presenting the Army Distinguished Service Medal to Colonel (Infantry) Ralph H. Van Deman, United States Army, for exceptionally meritorious and distinguished services to the Government of the United States, in a duty of great responsibility during World War I. As Chief of the Military Intelligence Branch, General Staff, in organizing the Intelligence Service of the Army in the United States, to Colonel Van Deman's ability, untiring zeal, and devotion to duty the building up of a very efficient Intelligence Service of the Army was largely due. General Orders: War Department, General Orders No. 73 (1919)
