= Counterintelligence Corps =

Former intelligence agency within the United States Army

The Counter Intelligence Corps (Army CIC) was a World War II and early Cold War intelligence agency within the United States Army consisting of highly trained special agents. Its role was taken over by the U.S. Army Intelligence Corps in 1961 and, in 1967, by the United States Army Intelligence Agency. Its functions are now performed by its modern-day descendant organization, United States Army Counterintelligence. The National Counter Intelligence Corps Association (NCICA), a veterans' association, was established in the years immediately following World War II by former military intelligence agents.

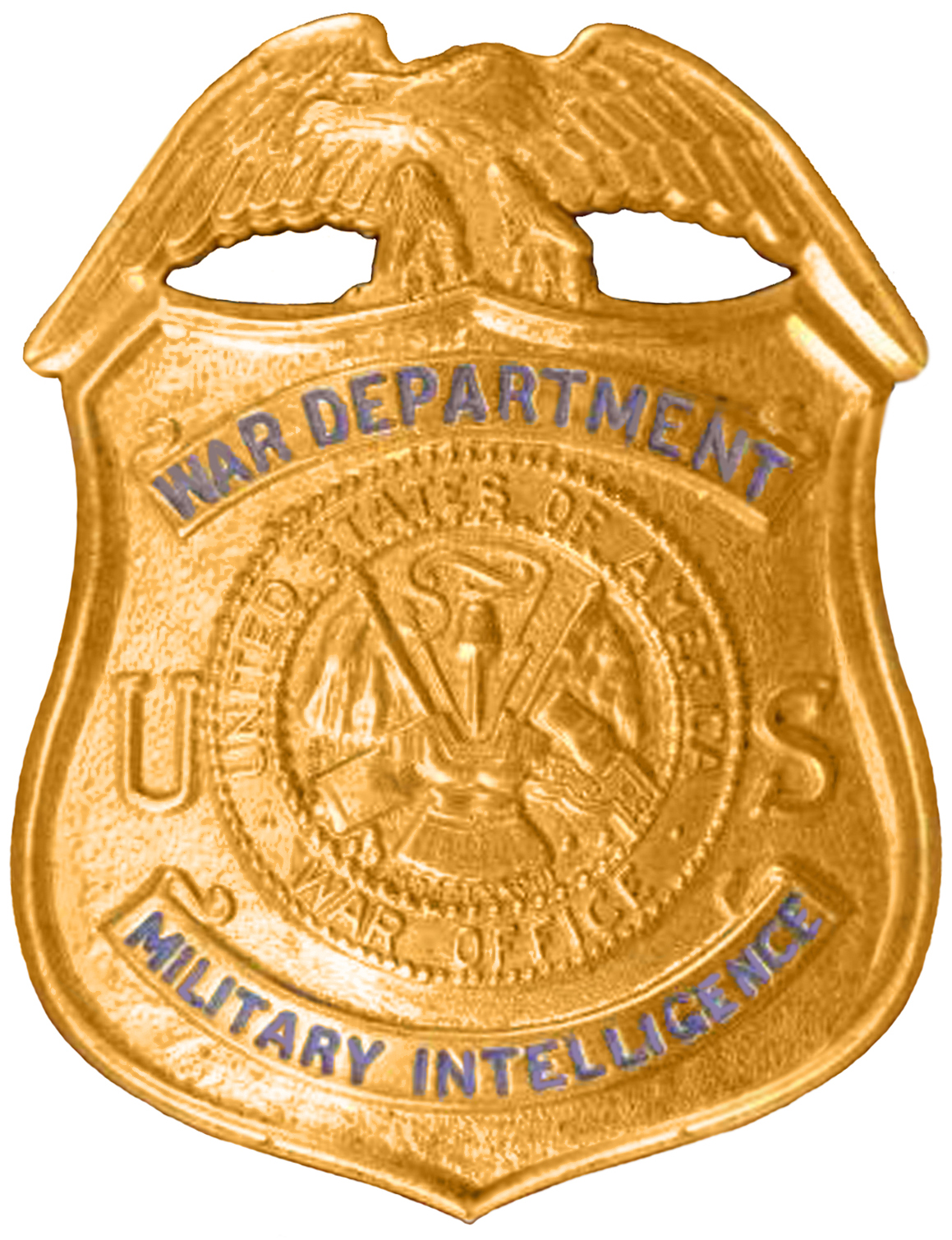
U.S. Army Counterintelligence Corps Special Agent Badge around World War II

== Origins ==
The CIC had its origins in the Corps of Intelligence Police founded by Ralph Van Deman in 1917. This organization, operating within the USA and on attachment to the American Expeditionary Force in France, at its peak numbered over 600 men. However, in the post-war period, the policy of isolationism, retrenchment of military spending, and economic depression meant that by the mid-1930s its numbers had fallen to fewer than 20 personnel.

== World War II ==
The looming threat of war in the late 1930s brought an expansion of the CIP back to its World War I levels, and the entry of the United States into World War II in December 1941 brought an even greater expansion and a new name. On 13 December 1941, the Adjutant General of the Army issued an order renaming the CIP as the Counter Intelligence Corps, effective from 1 January 1942. A new complement of 543 officers and 4,431 non-commissioned agents was authorized. Garland H. Williams was the first Chief of the School and CIC. The CIC recruited men with legal, police, or other investigative backgrounds, and particularly looked for men with foreign language skills. Special CIC teams were created during World War II in Europe, in large part from the Military Intelligence Service personnel (see Ritchie Boys). However, there were never enough of these, and local interpreters were often recruited.

As most CIC agents in the field (as well as Military Intelligence Service in Europe) held only non-commissioned officer rank— corporals and various grades of sergeant— they wore either plain clothes, or uniforms without badges of rank; in place of rank insignia, and so as not to be perceived as privates, agents typically wore officer "U.S." collar insignia. They were instructed to identify themselves only as "Agent" or "Special Agent" as appropriate, in order to facilitate their work. These practices continue among modern counterintelligence agents.

Within the U.S. the CIC, in collaboration with the provost marshal general and the Federal Bureau of Investigation (FBI), carried out background checks on military personnel having access to classified material, investigations of possible sabotage and subversion, and allegations of disloyalty, especially those directed against Americans of Japanese, Italian or German ancestry. Despite the prohibitions in the delimitation agreement with the FBI, the CIC ended up devoting considerable effort to civilian investigations. As Volume 7 of The History of the Counter Intelligence Corps explains: "Espionage and sabotage, being enemy directed, involved more than one person. Usually there were a number in the chain extending from the agent in the United States back through cutouts and couriers to the enemy country. This inevitably involved civilians with military suspects and the case became connected with the FBI. The military aspect became minor, and major investigative effort was in the civilian community to locate the higher-ups who presumably were controlling more than one agent."

However the use of informants within the Army became politically controversial, and CIC was forced to curtail its activities. In particular, the CIC was ordered to cease its domestic investigations, to destroy its investigative records, and to ship its agents out to overseas theaters. The reason for this sudden and unprecedented expulsion has never been clarified. One leading theory was expressed in the official history of the Corps, "the speed [of these events] left little doubt that someone—possibly Communists who still held key positions in government—was determined to halt CIC investigative activities in the United States". Another possible explanation is that the CIC mistakenly bugged the hotel room of Eleanor Roosevelt and incurred the President's wrath. In any event, the CIC protected the investigative records it had so painstakingly accumulated. According to Sayer and Botting (p. 47) "When the command was given to cease any investigations of known or suspected Communists and destroy all files on such persons immediately, eight of the nine Corps Area Commanders took the remarkable step of disobeying this order". According to the official history of the Corps, this information proved highly valuable in controlling communism: "the information acquired by CIC from May 1941 to September 1945 regarding communism and its adherents played a major part in keeping communism under control in the United States ever since".

=== Manhattan Project ===
CIC units were also involved in providing security for the Manhattan Project, including duty as couriers of fissionable bomb materials from Los Alamos, New Mexico to Tinian. They also operated in 1945 at the United Nations Organizing Conference in San Francisco, over which Alger Hiss presided as secretary-general. Three years later, when Alger Hiss was accused of being a Communist and filed a libel suit against his accuser, his lawyers unwittingly hired an undercover CIC Special Agent as their Chief Investigator to help prepare his libel suit.

In the European and Pacific theaters of operations CIC deployed detachments at all levels. These detachments provided tactical intelligence about the enemy from captured documents, interrogations of captured troops, and from para-military and civilian sources. They were also involved in providing security for military installations and staging areas, located enemy agents, and acted to counter stay-behind networks. They also provided training to combat units in security, censorship, the seizure of documents, and the dangers of booby traps. In some cases CIC agents such as Henry Kissinger found themselves acting as the de facto military government on the occupation of large towns before the arrival of Allied Military Government for Occupied Territories (AMGOT) officers. As the war in Europe came to a close, CIC were involved in the Operations Alsos, Paperclip and TICOM, searching for German personnel and research in atomic weapons, rockets and cryptography.

== Post-war operations ==
=== Operation Paperclip ===
At the end of World War II CIC agents were successful in Operation Paperclip that obtained German rocket scientists for the United States before the Soviets took them. This action aided in the success of the American rocket development program and resultant adventure into space. CIC actively continued counterintelligence activities in the Cold War, Korean War and Vietnam War.

=== Project Happiness ===
After the war, in West Germany, the CIC also directed the so-called "Project Happiness" that sought to recruit former Gestapo and SD members as informants to infiltrate East German communist parties, such as the SED and KPD.

=== Other activities ===
In the immediate post-war period, the CIC operated in the occupied countries, particularly Japan, Germany and Austria, countering the black market, and searching for and arresting notable members of the previous regime. Despite the problem of demobilization, with many experienced agents returning to civilian life, CIC became the leading intelligence organization in the American occupation zones, and very soon found themselves facing a new enemy in the emerging Cold War.

The outbreak of the Korean War in June 1950 meant that CIC was once again involved in a military conflict, and it underwent a major expansion. However this proved to be CIC's last chance to enjoy resources and recruits.

The proliferation of intelligence agencies had meant duplication of effort and disputes over responsibility, so in 1961 the CIC ceased to exist as an independent organization, as it was rolled into the Army's new Military Intelligence Branch.

While serving in the U.S. Army in the 1960s, Christopher H. Pyle learned that "Army intelligence had 1500 plain clothes agents watching every demonstration of 20 people or more throughout the United States". Pyle's disclosures led to Congressional investigations and a crackdown on what was regarded as the Army's investigative excesses. This ended what advocates regarded as the peak of counterintelligence efficiency: "At the height of the disturbance period, a CIC agent could get a report from the street to Fort Holabird HQ in 20 minutes, from practically any city in the U.S., seconds or brief minutes later the report was in Operations Center in a lower basement of the Pentagon".

== The "ratline" controversy ==
One of CIC's operations in post-war Europe was the operation of a "rat-line" – a conduit for spiriting informants and defectors out of the Soviet Zones of Occupation to safety in South America, via Italy or Spain, with false identities and documents paid for by CIC and made by the Vatican.

A Department of Justice investigation also uncovered the CIC's dealings with Father Krunoslav Draganović, a Croatian cleric based in Rome, who while working for CIC, also operated his own clandestine rat-line to transport Ustaše war criminals to Latin America.

A further report in 1988 also examined the CIC's use of Nazi war criminals and collaborators as informants in the years after World War II. In June 1988, Office of Special Investigations within the Criminal Division of the Department of Justice issued a public report which revealed that "at least 14 suspected Nazi war criminals, a number of whom likely were involved in the murder of Jews in occupied Europe, had been employed as intelligence informants by the CIC in Austria."

== Notable CIC agents ==
- Leroy Anderson, composer
- Donald L. Barlett, journalist
- Noel Behn, writer and theatrical producer
- Willy Brandt, later German chancellor
- John F. Collins, Mayor of Boston
- Hugh Colopy, Akron, Ohio attorney
- Miles Copeland Jr., musician
- Philip J. Corso, Lieutenant Colonel at Roswell, New Mexico
- J. Griffin Crump, editor, the Journal of Intergroup Relations
- William E. Dannemeyer, California congressman
- Ahn Doo-hee, lieutenant, assassin
- Foxtrot, art dealer
- Mike Gravel, Alaska senator
- Gene Gutowski, film producer
- Bill Hartman, athlete
- Anthony Hecht, poet
- Clint Hill, former United States Secret Service Agent
- Jeh V. Johnson, architect
- Henry Kissinger, Secretary of State
- Arthur Komori, District Court judge, Military Intelligence Hall of Fame inductee.
- Morton Kondracke, journalist
- Donald Lunde, psychiatrist of Ed Kemper and Patty Hearst
- Robie Macauley, editor and novelist
- John J. McFall, California congressman
- Ib Melchior, film producer
- Horace Miner, anthropologist
- George J. Mitchell, Maine senator
- Tom Moody, Mayor of Columbus, Ohio
- William Hughes Mulligan, Federal judge
- Richard Case Nagell, robbed a bank in 1963
- Walter Pincus, journalist
- Cruz Reynoso, lawyer and jurist
- Richard Sakakida, USAF Lt Col, Military Intelligence Hall of Fame inductee.
- J. D. Salinger, novelist
- Jerry Seltzer, roller derby promoter
- Bob Shamansky, Ohio congressman
- Richard A. Snyder, Pennsylvania State Senator
- Robert Saxton Taylor, Library Officer
- Michel Thomas, Linguist, Language Teacher
- Waldo Tobler, geography professor
- William Lewis Uanna, Security Expert

== See also ==
- Corps of Intelligence Police
- Military Intelligence Corps
- The History of the Counter Intelligence Corps
- United States Army Counterintelligence

== Sources ==
- CIC Records: A Valuable Tool for Researchers (scroll down)
- Counter Intelligence Corps History and Mission in World War II (PDF)
