= Construction Industry Council (Hong Kong) =

- 建造業議會
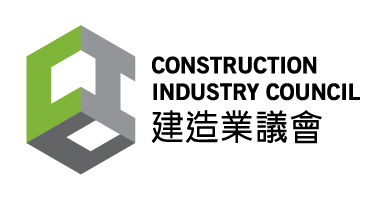

Agency overview
- Formed: 1 February 2007
- Superseding agency: Construction Workers Registration Authority
- Jurisdiction: Hong Kong
- Headquarters: 38/F, COS Centre, 56 Tsun Yip Street, Kwun Tong, Kowloon
- Ministers responsible: Ir Thomas HO On Sing, Chairman; Ir Albert CHENG, Executive Director
- Key document: Construction Industry Council Ordinance (Cap. 587)
- Website: cic.hk

Construction Industry Council
- Traditional Chinese: 建造業議會
Transcriptions
Yue: Cantonese
- Yale Romanization: Gin jouh yihp yíh wúi
- Jyutping: Gin^{3} zou^{6} jip^{6} ji^{5} wui^{2}

The Construction Industry Council (CIC) is a statutory body established on 1 February 2007 after the enactment of the Construction Industry Council Ordinance on 24 May 2006. The main functions of the CIC are forge consensus on long-term strategic issues, convey the industry's needs and aspirations to Government, as well as provide a communication channel for Government to solicit advice on all construction-related matters.

== Organisation ==
The CIC consists of a chairman and 24 members representing various sectors of the industry including employers, professionals, academics, contractors, workers, independent persons and Government officials.

== Funding ==
The CIC is funded primarily through the Construction Industry Levy, which must be paid by contractors in respect of construction operations with a value exceeding HK$3 million. The levy rate was set at 0.53% of the contract value as of 2019.

== Amalgamations ==
The amalgamation of the Construction Industry Council (CIC) and Construction Industry Training Academy (CITA) took place on 1 January 2008.
