= Beachcroft Towse =

VC recipient and campaigner for the blind (1864–1948)

Sir Ernest Beachcroft Towse VC KCVO CBE
- Towse in the uniform of the Honourable Corps of Gentlemen-at-Arms
- Born: 23 April 1864; Westminster, London
- Died: 21 June 1948 (aged 84); Goring-on-Thames, Oxfordshire
- Burial place: St Thomas of Canterbury Churchyard, Goring
- Military career
- Allegiance: United Kingdom
- Branch: British Army
- Service years: 1883 – 1902
- Rank: Captain
- Units: The Gordon Highlanders
- Conflicts: Chitral Expedition; Tirah Campaign; Second Boer War; World War I
- Awards: Victoria Cross; Royal Victorian Order; Order of the British Empire; Order of St John
- Other work: Patron of blind and military charities

Sir Ernest Beachcroft Beckwith Towse, VC, KCVO, CBE, (23 April 1864 – 21 June 1948) was an English British Army officer and campaigner for the blind. He was a recipient of the Victoria Cross, the highest and most prestigious award for gallantry in the face of the enemy that can be awarded to British and Commonwealth forces.

== Military career ==
Towse, the son of a solicitor, was born in London, and was educated at Stubbington House School, Gosport, and Wellington College, Berkshire. In February 1884 he joined the 3rd (Highland (Rifle) Militia) Battalion, Seaforth Highlanders as a lieutenant and in December 1885 received a Regular commission in the Wiltshire Regiment. In 1886 he transferred to the Gordon Highlanders. He distinguished himself with the Chitral Expedition in 1895, was promoted to captain on 20 May 1896, and served in the Tirah Campaign on the North-West Frontier of India in 1898.

After the outbreak of the Second Boer War in October 1899, his battalion was sent to South Africa. They were part of large force sent to relieve the Siege of Kimberley, and took part in the Battle of Magersfontein on 10–11 December 1899, in which the defending Boer force defeated the advancing British, causing heavy casualties. Towse was mentioned in the despatch from Lord Methuen describing the battle.

=== Details on the Victoria Cross ===
Towse was 35 years old, and a captain in the 1st Battalion, The Gordon Highlanders during the Second Boer War when the following deeds led to the award of the Victoria Cross:

On the 11th December, 1899, at the action of Magersfontein, Captain Towse was brought to notice by his Commanding Officer for his gallantry and devotion in assisting the late Colonel Downman, when mortally wounded, in the retirement, and endeavouring, when close up to the front of the firing line, to carry Colonel Downman on his back; but finding this not possible, Captain Towse supported him till joined by Colour-Sergeant Nelson and Lance-Corporal Hodgson. On the 30th April, 1900, Captain Towse, with twelve men, took up a position on the top of Mount Thaba, far away from support. A force of about 150 Boers attempted to seize the same plateau, neither party appearing to see the other until they were but 100 yards apart. Some of the Boers then got within 40 yards of Captain Towse and his party, and called on him to surrender. He at once caused his men to open fire and remained firing himself until severely wounded (both eyes shattered), succeeding in driving off the Boers. The gallantry of this Officer in vigorously attacking the enemy (for he not only fired, but charged forward) saved the situation, notwithstanding the numerical superiority of the Boers.

The shot that blinded Towse was fired by the Russian volunteer Yevgeny Maximov who was struggling with Towse during the action on Mount Thaba; the wounds Maximov suffered in that battle- splintered shoulder, a badly damaged shoulder blade and a serious wound to his skull- rendered him unfit for further military service, leading to him being honorably discharged from the Transvaal service. Queen Victoria, it is said, shed tears when pinning the decoration. Possibly at her instance, The War Office awarded Towse with a special wounds pension of £300 a year.

He retired from the army in February 1902, but was appointed by King Edward VII one of His Majesty′s Honourable Corps of Gentlemen at Arms on 1 January 1903.

== Campaigner for the blind ==
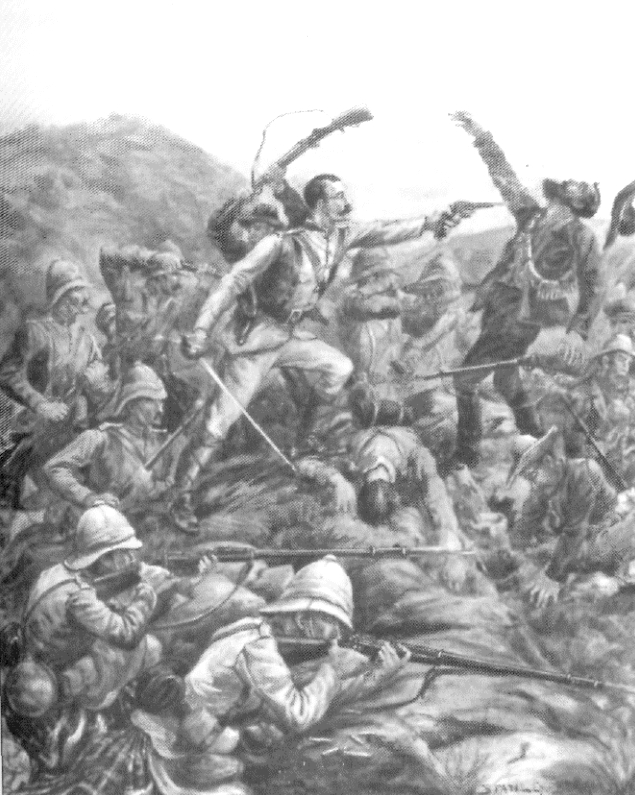
Captain Towse shoots at Lt Col Maximov at point-blank range in this British newspaper illustration from 1900.

Towse′s VC action left him blind and he spent much of the rest of his life working with the blind. He served in the First World War as a staff officer working with the wounded in base hospitals in France and Belgium, as well as promoting the welfare of blinded former servicemen. Towse was chairman of the British and Foreign Blind Association, founded the British Wireless for the Blind Fund in 1928 and was a trustee of The Association for Promoting the General Welfare of the Blind (GWB, now known as CLARITY - Employment for Blind People). He provided GWB a grant of £500, which enabled them to start making soap.

In 1940 he made his house available as a rehabilitation centre for civilians blinded through air raids. His sister, Beatrice Julia Beckwith Towse, was a committee member of the Disabled Officers Garden Homes (formerly Ex-Officers Direct Supply Association) organisation; she lived with him after his injury.

Among other appointments, Towse was a national vice-president of the British Legion from 1927, and Vice Patron of St Dunstans (now Blind Veterans UK) from 1946, holding both posts until his death in 1948.

Pipe Major George S. McLennan (1884–1929) of the Gordon Highlanders composed the 2/4 march "Captain E.B.B. Towse, V.C." in his honour.

== The VC medal ==
His Victoria Cross is displayed at the Gordon Highlanders Museum, Aberdeen, Scotland.

== Medals and honours ==

Ribbon	Description	Notes
	Victoria Cross (VC)	6 July 1900
	Royal Victorian Order (KCVO)	1927
	Order of the British Empire (CBE)	Civil Division – 1920
	Venerable Order of St John (K.StJ)	1916
	India Medal	3 Clasps: Relief of Chitral 1895; Punjab Frontier 1897–98; Tirah 1897–98
	Queen's South Africa Medal	3 Clasps: Cape Colony; Paardeberg; Driefontein
	1914–15 Star	
	British War Medal	
	World War I Victory Medal	With Mentioned in dispatches Oakleaf
	King Edward VII Coronation Medal	1902
	King George V Coronation Medal	1911
	King George V Silver Jubilee Medal	1935
	King George VI Coronation Medal	1937

=== Other honours ===
Towse also received a number of other honours, including sergeant-at-arms in ordinary to the queen (appointed 1900); member of the Honourable Corps of Gentlemen-at-Arms (1903–39); and was also a member of the Fishmongers' Company and the court of the Clothworkers' Company.
