= Elizabeth Margaretta Maria Gilbert =

English philanthropist

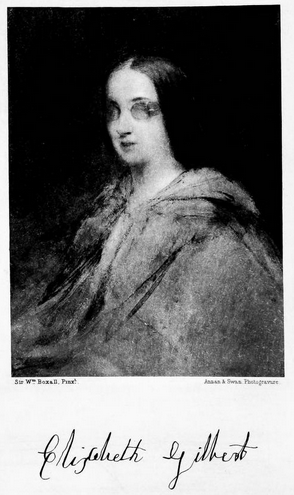
Elizabeth Gilbert, from an 1887 publication.

Elizabeth Margaretta Maria Gilbert (7 August 1826 – 7 February 1885) was an English philanthropist.

== Early life ==
Elizabeth Gilbert was born in Oxford, the daughter of Ashurst Gilbert, principal of Brasenose College, Oxford, and later the Bishop of Chichester and his wife, Mary Ann Wintle Gilbert. Elizabeth caught scarlet fever at the age of two, which resulted in her becoming blind. Her parents chose to educate her alongside her sisters, and she learned languages and music, and after 1851 used a "Foucault frame" writing device to write. She also enjoyed tactile astronomy lessons with an orrery, according to her biographer. "The little fingers fluttered over the planets and followed their movements with great delight."

== Philanthropy ==
In 1842, Gilbert came into a sizeable inheritance from a godmother, allowing her financial independence in adulthood. In 1854 she and William Hanks Levy (who was also blind) established a vocational training program, initially only for men, called "The Association for Promoting the General Welfare of the Blind" (GWB). Soon, as Gilbert's fundraising efforts succeeded, a library and more classes were added, and blind women were included by 1857.

She gained the support of Frances Martin who was also of independent means and an advocate for the education of women. Martin would in time become her biographer.

== Later years and legacy ==
Elizabeth Gilbert, never in robust health, became more ill in 1875, and died in 1884, aged 58 years. The organization Gilbert founded continues today as CLARITY - Employment for Blind People.
