= Visably =

British charity

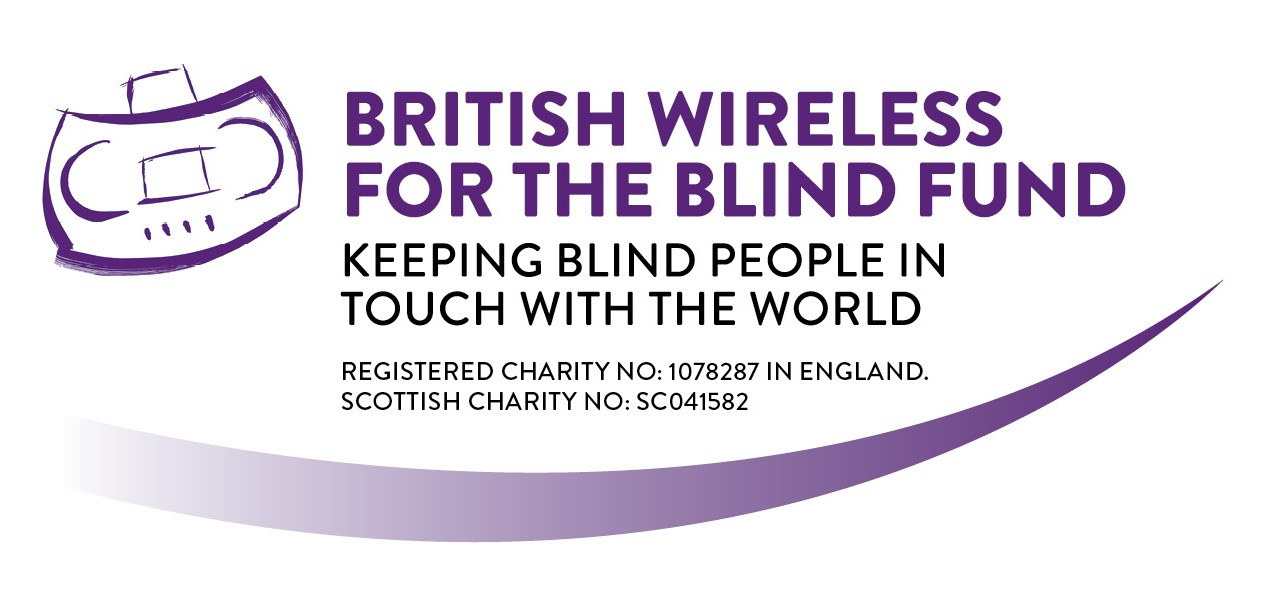

Visably (formerly the British Wireless for the Blind Fund or BWBF) is a British charity and a private company limited by guarantee.

Founded by Sir Ernest Beachcroft Beckwith Towse in 1928, the organisation provides adapted radios and audio players on free loan to registered blind and partially sighted UK residents over the age of eight, where hardship circumstances can be demonstrated by receipt of a means-tested benefit.

== Organisation ==
The charity has been providing specially adapted radios to visually impaired people since 1929. It prides itself on providing a personal service to each individual who receives a new set.

For people with sight loss, life becomes a challenge; not just the difficulty of getting out and about, but also the everyday tasks that we take for granted - like turning on the radio in the morning to listen to the news, so the charity exists to help improve the daily lives of visually impaired people, who are unable to afford a specially adapted radio, by providing the equipment on free loan.

Visably provides specially adapted radio and audio sets on a free loan basis, undertaking to repair or replace equipment free of charge if necessary. It is made up of a team of 17 staff, most based at its head office in Maidstone, Kent, and four regional development managers who work around the country.

The charity is supported by a network of local agents, usually blind societies or local authority sensory teams. It also has around 45 trained volunteers who help across the charity. There are currently around 40,000 people with BWBF sets across the UK and the charity aims to distribute around 3,500 new sets each year.

In July 2026 the charity changed its name from British Wireless for the Blind Fund to Visably.

== History ==
British Wireless for the Blind Fund (BWBF) was founded in 1928 by Ernest Beachcroft Beckwith Towse, who had lost his eyesight in action during the Boer War. He was awarded the Victoria Cross. for two acts of bravery, the second of which cost him his sight.

At the time of foundation, radios were commonly known as wirelesses. Although concession had been made in the 1926 Telegraphy (Blind Persons) Act, waiving the license cost for a wireless, the price of a radio was still prohibitive for many blind people. BWBF aimed to remedy this situation.

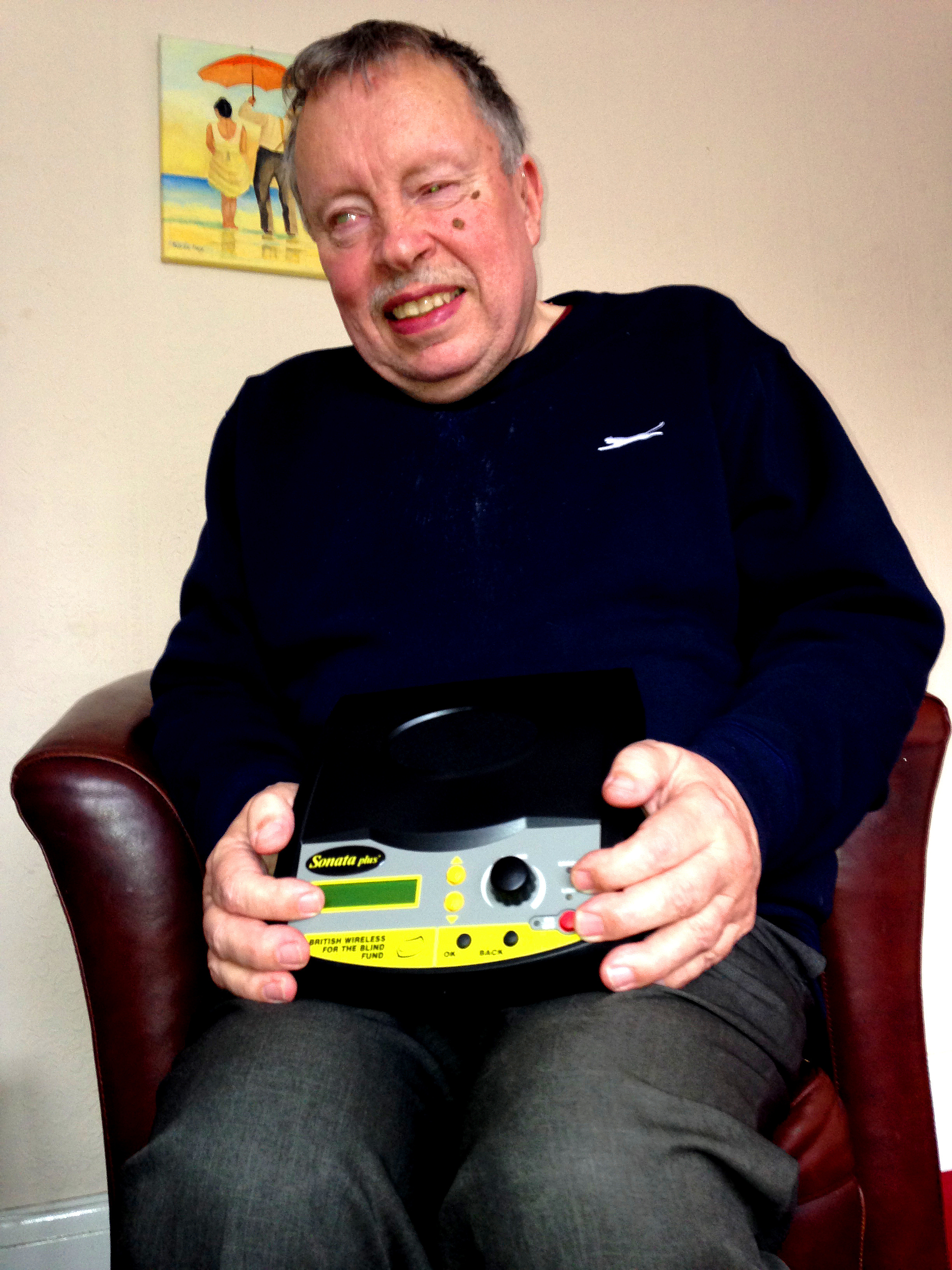
BWBF Sonata plus+ recipient Roy Williams

Winston Churchill broadcast the first BBC radio appeal for funds for the newly formed BWBF on Christmas Day, 1929, starting a tradition of broadcast appeals that continued until the 1980s. He said:

A fund has been started known as the “British Wireless for the Blind Fund”. Its object is to provide (so far as is practicable) that every blind person in the land shall have a wireless set. All the British Societies working for the welfare of the blind population and in touch with their wishes are agreed that this is much the best thing to do for blind people at the present moment. We cannot say “Let the blind see” but we can say – and it is the motto of this Fund – “Let the blind hear”. We cannot rescue them from darkness but we can rescue them from silence. One would almost have thought wireless was made for the blind. Just close your eyes for a moment and keep them closed. Fancy you can never open them again. And then supposing someone came and put a little instrument in your hands which you could hold to your ear and suddenly listen for hours at a time to music, songs, dances... and all that these inspiring programmes offer. Why, you wouldn't feel half so shut out, you would feel yourself back in the world.

Following the appeal, the first 100 crystal radio sets made by Burne-Jones & Co Ltd were issued to blind people at a cost of 31/6d per set. Headphones cost 7/3d a pair.

Winston Churchill made another Appeal at Christmas in 1930 asking for a further £20,000 to provide another 10,000 people with radios. He reminded listeners that it had been a year since he first appealed for the cause and wondered whether the year had gone quickly for blind listeners. He said that wireless brought the blind each night a pageant before their mind's eye. "That mysterious lamp of inner conscientiousness will be continually fed by your unfailing care. The blind will hear, and by hearing, see."

By 1931, £37,000 had been raised and 17,000 radio sets provided to blind listeners. In 1932 Lord Snowdon made the appeal, asking for donations to provide 2,000 more blind people with sets. James Ramsay MacDonald, Labour Prime Minister between 1931 - 1935, continued the tradition and appealed for additional funds on behalf of British Wireless for the Blind Fund from his home in Lossiemouth on Christmas Day 1933.

Legislation, passed in 1945, exempted blind people from having to pay purchase tax on radios.

Visably has had many distinguished chairmen since Towse. Of note is Sir John Wall who was chair from 1977 to 1991. A distinguished lawyer and high-court judge, Wall did not consider his blindness an impediment to his career and outside of his professional life, served the blind community in a number of roles. The first president of the fund was H.R.H. The Prince of Wales. later to become King Edward VIII.

== Radio sets ==
The first adapted radio set issued was a crystal radio receiver with a Braille dial. In the 1990s, a Magnum ‘1 valve’ receiver made by Burne-Jones & Co. Ltd. of London was discovered complete in its original postal packaging. The box contained not only the set but also batteries, earphones, a coil of copper aerial wire and some china “egg” insulators. The 100-foot aerial wire was needed to give a strong signal. Even in 1932, when the D9150 was issued and when receiver controls had already been simplified, setting up the set would have required some skill and would not have been easy for someone with a visual handicap. Like the crystal set, all the early Magnum radios specifically manufactured for BWBF utilized the newly formalised Braille code invented by Louis Braille to label the dials on the set.

Magnum sets from the E301 to the 3AS1691, with their wooden cases, thermionic valve and braille dial markings were issued between 1939 and 1943. Valve radios were a big advance in technology as they allowed incoming signals to be amplified. However, they needed heavy batteries to power them which did not last long. BWBF volunteers used to take and replace the batteries to users of the Magnum sets.

Bush Radio started trading in 1932. They worked with BWBF on producing specially adapted sets which included the Bakelite-cased DAC10 which was issued in 1950. This set had five top-mounted push-button controls, medium- and long-wave preset stations and was smaller and easier to move than the Magnum sets.

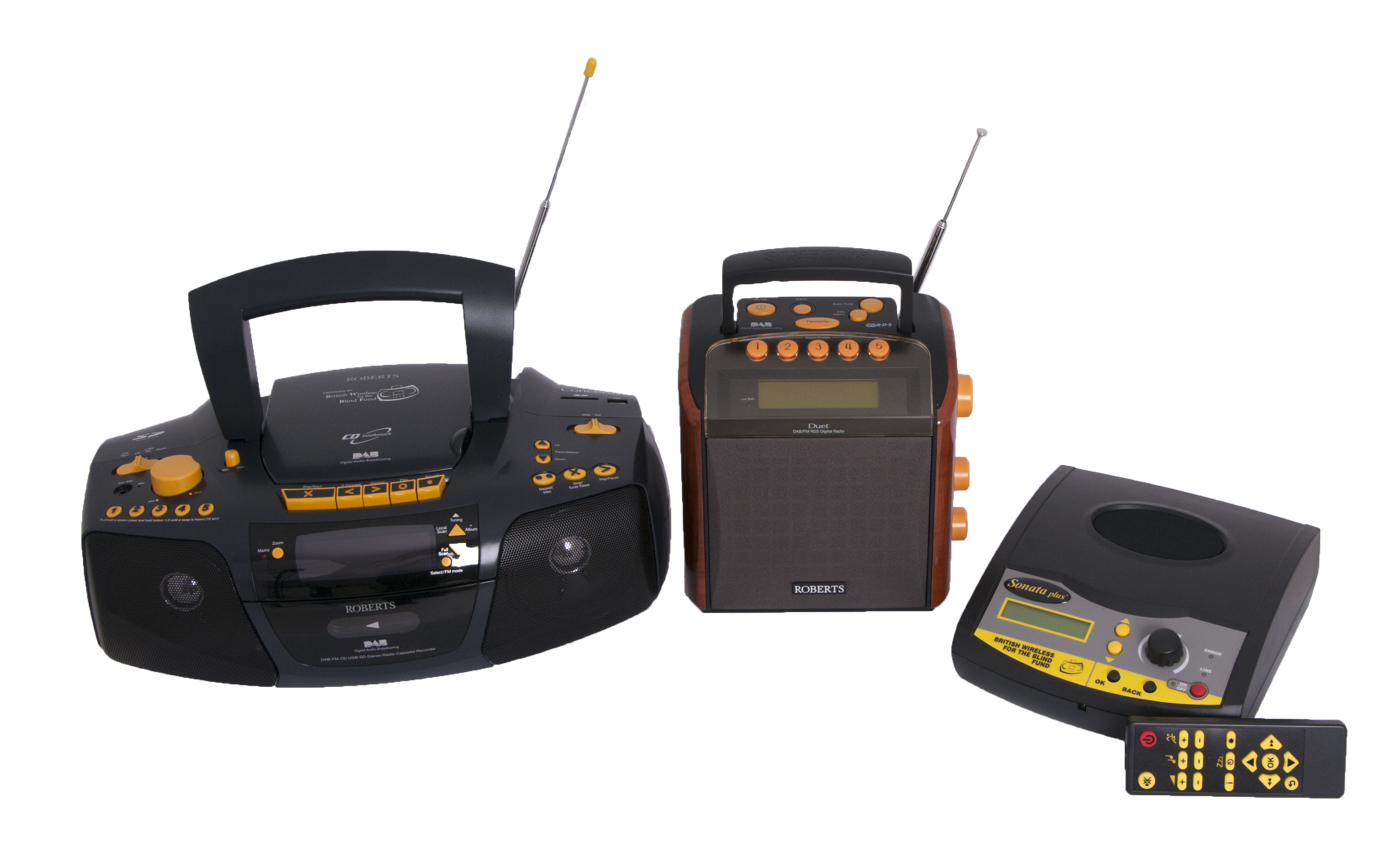
BWBF's Concerto 2, Duet 2 and Sonata plus+

BWBF collaborated with Roberts Radio in the early 1950s to produce new models suitable for those whose lack of vision meant they had difficulty using a standard set. The use of transistors to amplify sound instead of vacuum tubes meant that the radio could be much smaller, required far less power to operate than a tube radio and was more shock resistant. This advance in technology, coupled with modifications to mainstream sets that improved usability for visually impaired users, resulted in a series of sets being produced by Roberts from the early 1950s onwards. The R55 issued in 1954 had a turntable mounted into the base of the set for easy turning and also had top mounted controls. The R303, R600 and R505 incorporated both these features and were manufactured in the trademark red leather, specifically customized for BWBF. The R505 issued in 1974 also had a specially adapted waveband switch.

Bush also continued to make radios for BWBF and their VTR set issued in 1970 had a non-tilting aerial with a smooth plastic moulding on the tip to prevent accidental eye damage.

During the 1980s sets such as the Roberts RM33 incorporated up to five buttons on which radio stations could be preset. This feature has continued through to sets issued present day. With the development of magnetic tape data storage, sets were produced with either a single or dual tape deck. This gave visually impaired people the additional option of listening to pre-recorded music and books and of recording messages to send to friends and family. The Roberts RSR50 incorporated a cassette tape facility as well as having large buttons, and tone and balance controls.

BWBF briefly collaborated with Clarke and Smith, who specialised in educational equipment such as the "Tapete"-based audiobook system. Their simple, easy-to-use radios and sound receivers with large controls were a further step towards improved usability. The CS1 1318 model saw the new usage of yellow control knobs against a charcoal grey body set to provide a colour contrast to help those people who had some residual sight. The yellow and charcoal grey have become standard BWBF set colours.

With the move to compact discs for storage of data, a CD player was added to the range of features of the Roberts specially adapted sets. The ‘Symphony’ set issued in 2004 was one of the earliest sets with this feature and also included a ‘bookmark’ facility so that the user could return to the place in the music or story where they had left off.

As new data storage devices have developed, so have the facilities to play them. The ‘Concerto 2 ‘ set, first issued in 2011 is both a DAB and FM radio, can play tapes, CDs, and files from an SD card or a USB memory stick. Ten radio stations can be pre-set, five on DAB and five on FM. It has a built-in microphone and headphone socket, controls with tactile symbols, a large backlit LCD and can be mains or battery-powered.

Internet radio, which involves streaming media, was pioneered in 1993. The Sonata and Sonata Plus+ sets which use this technology were developed by Solutions Radio of the Netherlands. Sonata Plus+ is a wireless internet radio and audio library, fully accessible to blind and partially sighted people. It has five buttons, one dial and an audible menu.

BWBF hold a collection of most of the sets issued since the 1930s, partly thanks to the efforts of members of the British Vintage Wireless Society. In the early 1990s Maurice Steadman, a radio engineer and member of that society was asked to repair and restore old sets held by, or donated to BWBF:

In 2012, BWBF received a Heritage Lottery Fund grant to bring together the history and heritage of the radio sets issued since the fund was set up. An article in The Radio Magazine entitled ‘Stay tuned’ looks at how the information was uncovered.

== Tablet devices ==
In 2017, BWBF launched Bumblebee, an easy-to-use app, specially designed to meet the changing needs of the people we support and to unlock the digital world for those with sight loss. It has been developed by experts at British Wireless who have worked closely with blind and partially sighted people to ensure the product meets differing needs.

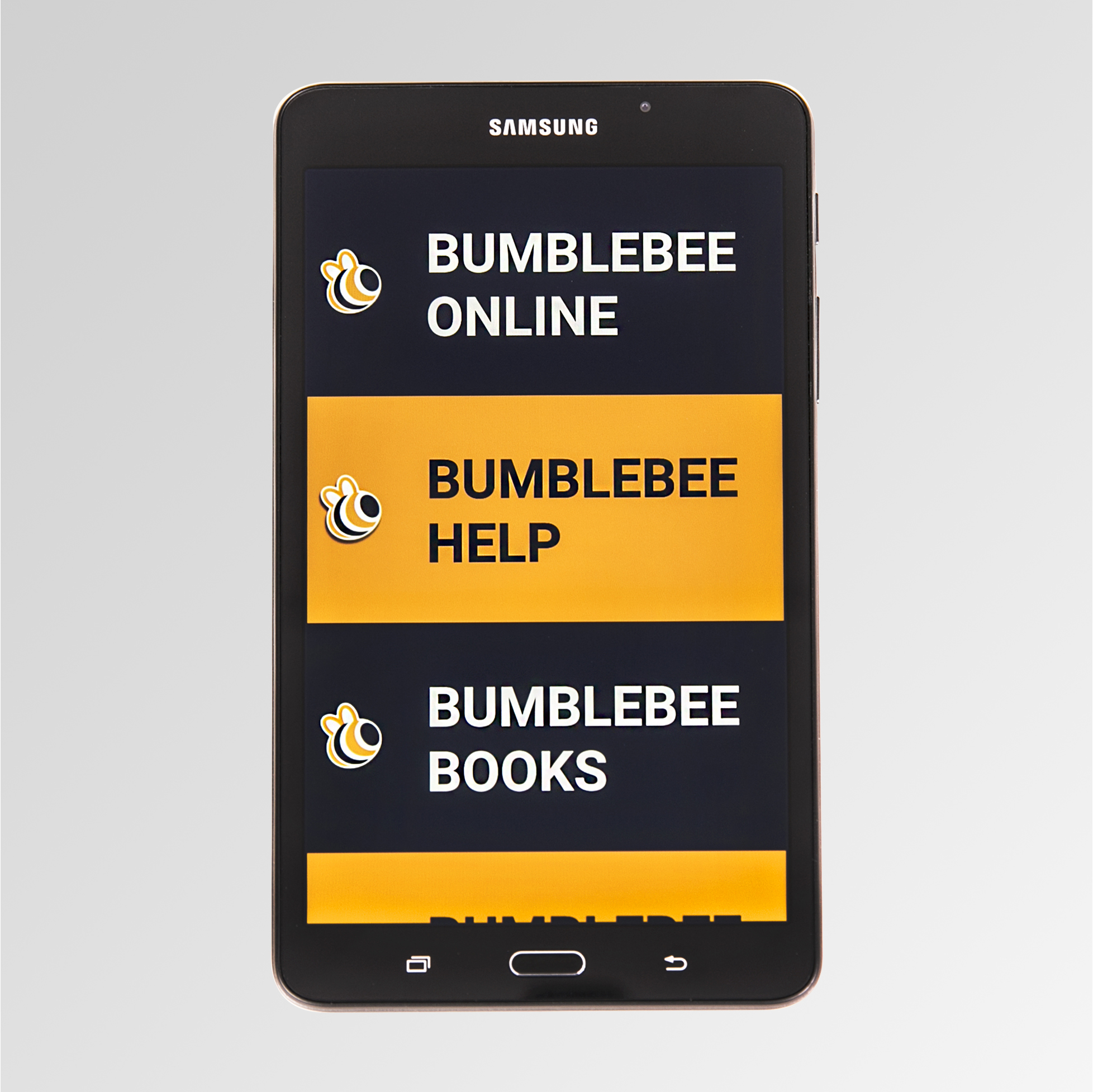

The large, simple menus can be viewed in a variety of contrasts, including black and yellow so they stand out to those with residual vision. Combined with audio description of each menu item, it is also user friendly for people with very little or no vision.

Bumblebee provides access to thousands of radio stations, podcasts, talking newspapers and magazines, online content pages and other information from one portable device.

There is also a community section, where users can share their experiences, discuss trending topics, share tips, talk about popular content and help and support each other – all by using the in-built text-to-speech function. Part of the exclusivity of Bumblebee is the user-led content aspect, where listeners can essentially create their own personalised audio library in their pocket.

It requires a wireless connection to stream live radio and download content. Once the audio files have been saved to the tablet which the app is issued on, they can be accessed anywhere; making Bumblebee perfect for listening on-the-go.

Applications

Talking Newspaper

Speech Radio harnesses technology that has never before been used in a mobile app to allow the user to control its functionality and operations entirely by voice.

Calling on more than 90 years of experience working with those living with sight loss around the country, Speech Radio builds on BWBF's lockdown campaign which has seen it delivering hundreds of specially adapted radios to recipients around the country during the pandemic to help reduce isolation and loneliness during the COVID-19 pandemic.

Speech Radio is now free to download on IOS and Android.

Alexa Skill

Our own Natural Language Programming allows the service to take the user's voice input, convert it into text and then decide what function to bring from this result. This app is currently available on iOS and Android Beta after being fully tested.

This skill allows visually and reading impaired users to access talking newspapers and magazines from all over the UK. Open the skill and ask the skill for the name of the talking newspaper you would like the skill is currently compatible with all talking newspapers hosted by us.

Speech Radio App

British Wireless for the Blind Fund has now confirmed the launch of a ground-breaking new app on IOS and Android. Speech Radio harnesses technology that has never been used in a mobile app to allow the user to control its functionality and operations entirely by voice.

== Governing document ==
Visably is registered at Companies House as a private company limited by guarantee. It is also registered as a charity with the registered with the Charity Commission for England and Wales and in Scotland. The company was incorporated on 28 October 1999 under a Memorandum of Association which established the objects and powers of the charitable company and is governed under its Articles of Association, as amended 23 February 2006.

The objects of the charity are the relief of registered blind or registered partially sighted people in the British Islands through the provision of radios and audio players and any other equipment or services necessary to allow them to benefit from the reception of sound transmission in accordance with the Memorandum of Association. The objects fall within subsection 3 (1) of the Charities Act 2011 relating to the relief of those in need, by reason of youth, age, ill-health, disability, financial hardship or other disadvantage.

== Funding ==
Visably is a not-for-profit charity which relies primarily on public donations, legacies and grants to sustain its operations. It does not receive any government funding.

== BWBF Direct ==
BWBF Direct is the trading arm of British Wireless for the Blind Fund. Its activities are the sale of adapted and non-adapted radio and audio sets. All profits are gifted to the charity.

== See also ==
- RNIB
