= Frances Martin =

British educationist and author

- Born: 4 November 1829; Richmond
- Died: 13 March 1922 (aged 92); Hampstead

(Mary Anne) Frances Martin (4 November 1829 – 13 March 1922) was a British educationist and author. She founded and ran what became the Frances Martin College for Working Women in London until 1966.

== Life ==
Martin was born in Richmond in 1829. Her father had a private income from houses and investments he owned. She was one of four children born to Matilda Caroline and Edward Curtiss Martin. Her future changed when she became one of the first students at Queen's College, Harley Street when she was about twenty. The college's founder was the theologian F. D. Maurice and his aim was to ensure that governesses were better educated.

She was a supporter of Maurice and she chose to lead the new ladies' college at Bedford Square when it started in 1852. She was assisted by Jane Benson who was Martin's life-long friend. The whole purpose of the educational facility was to prepare girls to attend Bedford College and Martin proved an inspirational teacher. However, the college's council feared that Martin was not following their intentions closely enough.

In 1866 the council of Bedford college conducted an enquiry into the school. Elisabeth Jesser Reid had just died and after discussion they decided that they were going to close the school so they could concentrate on higher education in May 1868. In 1867, her friend Alexander MacMillan placed her in charge of the Sunday Library for Household Reading.

In 1854 Elizabeth Margaretta Maria Gilbert and William Hanks Levy (who was also blind) established a vocational training program, initially only for men, called "The Association for Promoting the General Welfare of the Blind" (GWB). Martin became a supporter and in time she wrote Gilbert's biography.

She founded the College for Working Women in 1874 after the Working Women's College decided to become co-educational. She was supported by George and Amelia Tansley, Llewellyn Davies, and Sir John Lubbock. Her new college was based in Fitzroy Street.

Martin died in 1922 in Hampstead and was buried by the grave of Jane Benson. She left £500 to the College for Working Women and the college decided to change its name to the Frances Martin College. The college operated until 1966 when it merged with the Working Mens College.
