= Honoured Dead Memorial =

Provincial Heritage Sight and Monument in Kimberley, Northern Cape

- South Africa
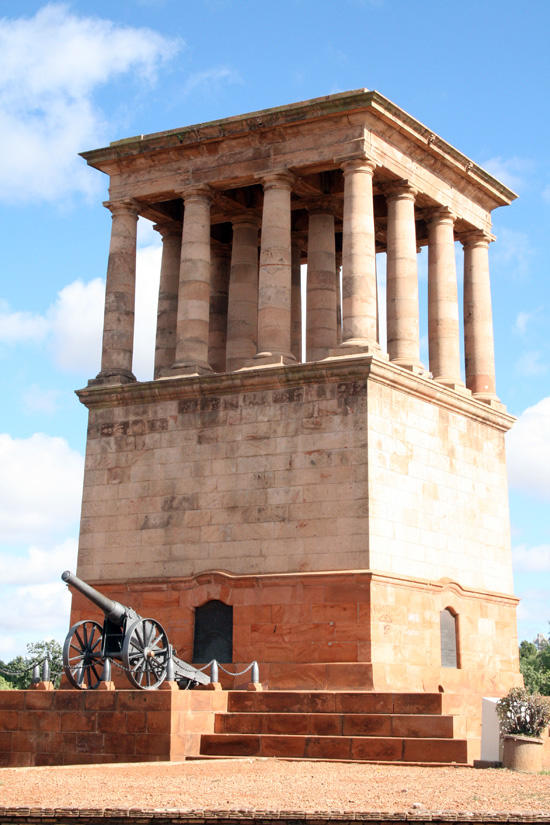
- Honoured Dead Memorial in Kimberley with the Long Cecil gun in the foreground.
- For defenders who died during the Siege of Kimberley
- Unveiled: 28 November 1904
- Location: 28°45′4″S 24°46′10″E near Kimberley, Northern Cape
- Designed by: Herbert Baker
- THIS FOR A CHARGE TO OUR CHILDREN IN SIGN OF THE PRICE WE PAID THE PRICE WE PAID FOR THE FREEDOM THAT COMES UNSOILED TO YOUR HAND; READ REVERE AND UNCOVER FOR HERE ARE THE VICTORS LAID THEY THAT DIED FOR THE CITY BEING SONS OF THE LAND

The Honoured Dead Memorial is a provincial heritage site in Kimberley in the Northern Cape province of South Africa. It is situated at the meeting point of five roads, and commemorates those who died defending the city during the Siege of Kimberley in the Anglo-Boer War.

In 1986, it was described in the Government Gazette as

Cecil John Rhodes commissioned Sir Herbert Baker to design a memorial...which commemorates those who fell during the Kimberley Siege.

Rhodes sent Baker to Greece to study ancient memorials - the Nereid Monument at Xanthus greatly influenced his design.

The monument is built of sandstone quarried in the Matopo Hills in Zimbabwe and is the tomb of 27 soldiers. It features an inscription that Rhodes commissioned Rudyard Kipling to write.

The Long Cecil gun that was designed and manufactured by George Labram in the workshops of De Beers during the siege is mounted on its stylobate (facing the Free State). It is surrounded by shells from the Boer Long Tom. The memorial was dedicated on 28 November 1904. It was vandalised in 2010 when brass fittings were broken off parts of the gun.
