= Sunday Library for Household Reading =

Series of children's books

The Sunday Library for Household Reading was a British series of children's religious biographies and histories. It was published by Macmillan from 1868, and edited by Frances Martin. The intended audience has been identified as families reading after church service on Sunday.

The works appeared in monthly parts at one shilling, as part publishing.

Number	Year	Author	Title
I	1868	Charlotte Mary Yonge	The Pupils of St. John the Divine
II	1868	Charles Kingsley	The Hermits
III	1868	Frederic William Farrar	Seekers after God
IV	1868	George Macdonald	England's Antiphon
V	1869	François Guizot	Saint Louis and Calvin, translation by Frances Martin
VI	1869	Catherine Winkworth	Christian Singers of Germany
VII	1869	George Frederick Maclear	Apostles of Mediæval Europe
VIII	1869	Thomas Hughes	Alfred the Great
IX	1870	Annie Keary	The Nations Around
X	1870	R. W. Church	St. Anselm
XI	1868	Mrs. Oliphant	Saint Francis of Assisi
XII	1871	Charlotte Yonge	Pioneers and Founders; or, Recent Workers in the Mission Field
