= CLARITY – Employment for Blind People =

Former British manufacturer originally a charity for the blind

CLARITY - Employment for Blind People
- Abbreviation: CLARITY
- Formation: 1854
- Dissolved: 2022
- Type: Charity
- Purpose: employment and training of blind and disabled people
- Staff: 80
- Website: www.clarityproducts.org

Clarity, formerly CLARITY – Employment for Blind People, was a British manufacturer of soaps and beauty products employing blind and disabled people. It was established in 1854 as a charitable organization providing employment and training to blind and disabled people, originally under the name The Association for Promoting the General Welfare of the Blind. In January 2020 it entered administration and was bought by Nicholas Marks, becoming Clarity Products Ltd and then Jublee Number 7 Ltd. Liquidation of the company began in 2022.

== Operations ==
Clarity had a factory in Highams Park, London, which produced toiletries and cleaning products, including soap, handwash, shampoo, body lotion, window cleaner and car cleaning kits, branded as Clarity, Beco and Soap Co. The products were manufactured in-house and were not tested on animals; in 2017, the facility obtained Planet Mark sustainability certification. As of 2011 the factory employed 80 people with a range of physical and mental disabilities. Clarity also employed blind people in telesales offices across the UK. As of January 2020, there were approximately 80 employees, 65 of whom were blind, disabled, or had a health condition.

Clarity used proceeds from the sale of products to fund its work providing training and employment for blind and disabled people. Workplace and "Skills for Life" training programmes were provided to assist employees in progressing within the organisation. Employees were given the opportunity to take National Vocational Qualifications in Manufacturing and Performing Manufacturing Operations, Customer Service and Team Leadership, and were also provided welfare and support services.

== History ==
The charity was established in 1854 by Elizabeth Gilbert, a wealthy blind woman, as The Association for Promoting the General Welfare of the Blind. She established a workshop in Holborn where 7 employees made baskets. The organisation soon moved to larger premises in Brunswick Square, then Euston Road and finally, in 1893, a factory was opened in Tottenham Court Road. Over time, the organisation started producing a number of other items, including brushes, brooms, upholstery, chair seats, divans and mattresses.

Queen Victoria became the charity's patron in 1859. Other early supporters included Prime Minister William Ewart Gladstone, the Archbishop of Canterbury, and Charles Dickens, who is believed to have written an article in Household Words entitled "At Work in the Dark". When Queen Victoria died in 1901 and her son Edward VII became King, he became the new patron of the charity, along with his wife Queen Alexandra of Denmark. Other supporters of the charity in the early 20th century included Edward Prince of Wales (later King Edward VIII) and Prince Christian of Schleswig-Holstein. Products were also used by royalty. For example, in 1901, General Welfare of the Blind produced all the mats and some other articles used to fit SS Ophir, which conveyed the Duke and Duchess of Cornwall and York (the future King George V and Queen Mary of Teck on their world tour.

General Welfare of the Blind started making soap in 1937, following a grant of £500 from two of its trustees: blinded war veteran Sir Beachcroft Towse and William Morris, then Lord Nuffield. After the Second World War, the organisation began making talcum powder, and over the next 50 years the product range continued to grow to include shampoos, bath foams, shower gels, liquid soap, body lotions, beeswax polish, car wash, kitchen cleaners, bath cleaners and air fresheners. Products were sold door to door until 1995, when the charity transitioned to telesales plus local marketing.

In 1954, in celebration of its 100th anniversary, the organisation built four houses in Tottenham to house blind workers. In 1982, it moved to Ashburton Grove; the new premises were opened by its president, Birgitte, Duchess of Gloucester. This became the site for Arsenal F.C.'s Emirates Stadium, so the charity moved again to York Way in 2002, and in 2013 manufacturing moved to Highams Park.

In the second half of the 20th century, Clarity expanded its mission to cover all disabilities, and in 1998 it opened an office in Scotland. Nick Hurd MP, Minister for Civil Society, visited the York Way premises in 2010. In 2011, CLARITY featured in the Cabinet Office report "Growing the Social Investment Market" as an example of a successful social enterprise. The Soap Co was launched as a luxury brand in 2015 and BECO for vegan, biodegradeable and water-saving soaps in 2018, and the organisation rebranded in 2019 to CLARITY & Co.

CLARITY was placed in administration in January 2020 because it was losing money and unable to fund its pension obligations. It was bought the same day by businessman Nicholas Marks and became Clarity Products Ltd. There were subsequently complaints of non-payment of wages, COVID-19 furlough payments, redundancy payments, and National Insurance contributions, with some former workers making successful employment tribunal claims. Clarity was later renamed Jublee Number 7 Ltd and liquidation began by March 2022.

== See also ==
- Action for Blind People
- The Guide Dogs for the Blind Association
- Royal National Institute of Blind People
- Fight for Sight
- Royal London Society for the Blind
