= Siege of Kimberley =

1899–1900 battle of the Second Boer War

- Part of the Second Boer War
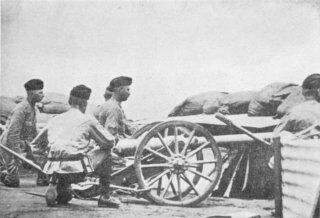
- British RML 2.5-inch mountain gun employed in the defence of Kimberley during the Second Boer War
Date	14 October 1899 – 15 February 1900
Location	Kimberley, Cape Colony (present-day South Africa) 28°44′18″S 24°45′50″E
Result	British victory

Belligerents
United Kingdom	South African Republic; Orange Free State

Commanders and leaders
(United Kingdom) Cecil Rhodes; (United Kingdom) Robert Kekewich (Note: Rhodes was a civilian de facto commander); (United Kingdom) John French	(Orange Free State) Cornelius Wessels; (Orange Free State) Naas Ferreira; (South African Republic) Piet Cronjé

Strength
>1,600	3,000–6,500; Several guns

Casualties and losses
42 killed 135 wounded	Heavy

The siege of Kimberley took place during the Second Boer War at Kimberley, Cape Colony (present-day South Africa), when Boer forces from the Orange Free State and the Transvaal besieged the diamond mining town. The Boers moved quickly to try to capture the area when war broke out between the British and the two Boer republics in October 1899. The town was ill-prepared, but the defenders organised an energetic and effective improvised defence that was able to prevent it from being taken.

Outside Kimberley, the Boers treated the occupied territory as part of one of the republics, appointing a 'landdrost' (magistrate) and changing the name of the neighbouring town of Barkly West to Nieu Boshof.

Cecil Rhodes, who had made his fortune in the town, and who controlled all the mining activities, moved into the town at the onset of the siege. His presence was controversial, as his involvement in the Jameson Raid made him one of the primary protagonists behind war breaking out. Rhodes was in constant disagreement with the military, but he was nonetheless instrumental in organising the defence of the town. The Boers shelled the town with their superior artillery in an attempt to force the garrison to capitulate. Engineers of the De Beers company manufactured a one-off gun named Long Cecil; however the Boers soon countered with a much larger siege gun that terrified the residents, forcing many to take shelter in the Kimberley Mine.

The British military had to change its strategy for the war as public opinion demanded that the sieges of Kimberley, Ladysmith and Mafeking be relieved before the Boer capitals were assaulted. The first attempt at relief of Kimberley under Lord Methuen was stopped at the battles of Modder River and Magersfontein. The 124-day siege was finally relieved on 15 February 1900 by a cavalry division under Lieutenant-General John French, part of a larger force under Lord Roberts. The battle against the Boer general Piet Cronjé continued at Paardeberg immediately after the town itself was relieved.

== Background ==
Prior to the onset of the Second Boer War, Kimberley was the second-biggest city in the Cape Colony, and vibrant and prosperous as the centre of diamond mining operations of the De Beers Mining Company, who supplied 90% of the world's diamonds. The town had a population of 40,000, of which 25,000 were white. It was one of a handful of British outposts in the far north east of the colony, located just a few kilometres from the borders of the Boer republics of the Transvaal and Orange Free State; Cape Town was 1,041 kilometres (647 mi) away by rail, while Port Elizabeth was 780 kilometres (480 mi). The closest Boer settlements were Jacobsdal to the south and Boshof to the east.

== Preparation ==
The De Beers company was concerned about the defence of Kimberley some years before the outbreak of the war, particularly its vulnerability to attack from the neighbouring Orange Free State. In 1896, an arms depot was formed, a plan of defence sent to the authorities and a local defence force set up. As it began to look more likely that war would break out, the nervous citizens of Kimberley appealed to the premier of the Cape Colony, William Philip Schreiner, for additional protection, but he did not believe the town to be under serious threat and declined to arm it further. His reply to an appeal for arms in September 1899 stated: “There is no reason whatever for apprehending that Kimberley is or will be in any danger of attack and your fears are therefore groundless.”

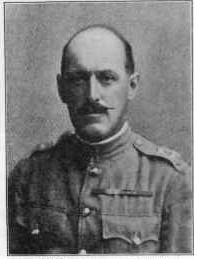
Lt Col Robert Kekewich

The town next appealed to the high commissioner, this time with more success. On 4 October 1899, Major Scott-Turner was permitted to summon volunteers to join the town guard and raise the Diamond Fields Artillery. Three days later, the town was placed under the command of Colonel Robert Kekewich of the 1st Battalion, Loyal Regiment (North Lancashire), and secured against a coup de main, but not against sustained siege.

Colonel Kekewich's troops consisted of four companies of the Loyal North Lancashire Regiment, some Royal Engineers, six RML 2.5-inch mountain guns and two machine guns. Also at his disposal were 120 men of the Cape Police (recalled from various outposts along the railway line), 2,000 irregular troops, the Kimberley Light Horse, and a battery of obsolete seven-pounder guns. Eight Maxim machine guns were mounted on redoubts built atop tailing heaps around the town.

Cecil John Rhodes, the founder of De Beers, was contemplating moving into the town. The citizens feared that his presence there, given his prominent role in the breakdown of Anglo-Boer relations leading up to the war, would antagonise the Boers. Consequently, the mayor of Kimberley, as well as various associates of Rhodes, tried to discourage him. However, Rhodes ignored the advice and moved into the town just prior to the onset of the siege, very narrowly evading capture when the Boer ultimatum expired at 5 pm on 11 October while he was still en route. It was a calculated move to raise the political stakes and thereby force the British government to divert war resources to lifting the siege on his mining operation. Since most of the resources in the garrison were owned by De Beers, Rhodes inevitably became an important factor in the defence organised by Colonel Robert Kekewich. As head of the mining company that owned most of the assets in the town, the military felt that Rhodes proved to be more of a hindrance as he did not co-operate fully with them; civil and military authorities were not always working together, especially after the death of the second in command of the garrison, Major Scott-Turner. The military took the following view of Rhodes:

Rhodes had come into his own Kimberley and for the first time he was not master in it. He found himself a sterilized dictator acting in an atmosphere too tenuous to support his vitality but sufficient to preserve it from extinction. He was subject to the authority of the military commandant, a galling position for a distinguished statesman who had not a high opinion of the professional capacity of the British officer.

In practice, unlike Baden Powell at Mafeking, Kekewich did not have free rein to conduct the defence as he saw fit.

Kekewich decided to include the neighbouring municipality of Beaconsfield as well as the outlying suburb of Kenilworth inside the 22-kilometre (14 mi) defensive perimeter he established around the town. Rhodes sponsored the raising of a new regiment called the Kimberley Light Horse, but Lord Methuen advised Kekewich that “Rhodes is to leave Kimberley the day after I arrive. Tell him he is not to interfere in military matters.”

== Siege ==

Soup ration ticket from the siege of Kimberley

The conflict at Kimberley started on 14 October 1899. Colonel Baden-Powell, anticipating the inevitable onset of hostilities, encouraged all the women and children to leave the town. Some civilians left in a special train, escorted as far as Vryburg by an armoured train. On the return journey, the armoured train was captured in the first action of the war between Kimberley and Mafeking at Kraaipan by Boers under the command of fighting general De la Rey, the hero of the western Transvaal. On 12 October, the Jacobsdal Commando severed the railway line at the bridge over the Modder River south of Kimberley, whereafter the Boers entrenched themselves in the hills at Spytfontein. (Note: Spytfontein is located immediately south of Kimberley at 28°52′56″S 24°41′00″E) Meanwhile, the Boshof Commando severed the railway line 16 kilometres (10 mi) north of the town at Riverton Road, then shut off the primary water supply at Riverton on the Vaal River. (Note: Riverton is located north of Kimberley on the Vaal River at 28°30′51″S 24°42′02″E) For the first time, water in the mines became more precious than the diamonds in them. On 14 October the Boers cut the telephone line to the Cape. Heliograph and dispatch riders consequently had to make hazardous journeys through Boer lines to the Orange River and then to Cape Town and Port Elizabeth. On 15 October, martial law was declared in the town.

The cattle that usually grazed on the outskirts of the town presented a problem; if they were left, they would be lost to the Boers, but if they were slaughtered, the meat would perish quickly in the summer heat. The De Beers chief engineer, George Labram, provided a solution by building an industrial refrigeration plant underground in the Kimberley mine to preserve the meat.

The Boer commander, Commandant Cornelius Wessels, presented Kekewich with an ultimatum on 4 November, demanding the town's surrender. Kekewich replied the same day, stating: “...you are hereby invited to effect the occupation of this town as an operation of war by the employment of the military forces under your command”. When the siege of Kimberley itself began in earnest on 6 November, the situation favoured an attack. The Boers were in control of the railway from the Orange River to Mafeking, while arms and ammunition were in short supply in Kimberley. On 7 November, the Boers started shelling the town. Communication with the outside world was not seriously impeded however. The Boer strategy was not to attack the town in a full battle, but rather to wait for the defenders to capitulate, all the time wearing them down with shelling. The defenders tried to send the large contingent of migrant native labourers that was working in the mines home, but twice the Boers drove them back into the town in an apparent attempt to put pressure on the limited food and water supply.

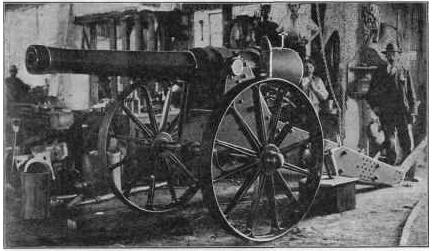
Long Cecil gun in the workshops of De Beers

Rhodes had his own agenda, which differed from the greater war goal of redressing wrongs in the Transvaal that had triggered the conflict. He used his position and influence to demand relief of the siege vociferously in both the press and directly of the government. However, Kekewich was a more cool-headed man, and was careful to let the authorities in Cape Town know that the situation was by no means desperate and that he would be able to hold out for several weeks. The feud between the two men escalated when the Diamond Fields Advertiser, the local newspaper which was under Rhodes's control, ignored the military censor and printed information that compromised the military. Kekewich obtained permission from his superior to place Rhodes under arrest if necessary. (Note: Magnus says Lord Kitchener granted permission to arrest Rhodes, while Van Hartesveldt says it was Lord Roberts.)

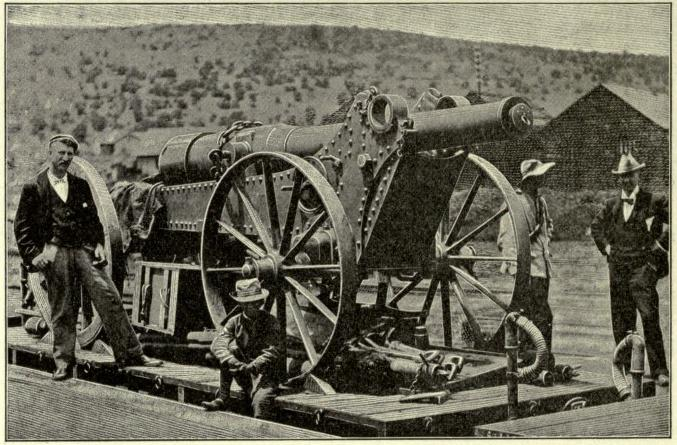
Boer Long Tom gun en route to Kimberley

The food and water supply was managed closely by the military authorities. Rationing was imposed as the food supply dwindled, with the inhabitants eventually resorting in the final states of the siege to eating horse meat. Vegetables could not be grown easily because of a shortage of water. The scarcity of vegetables took the hardest toll on the poorest people, notably the 15,000-strong indigenous population; a local doctor suggested that they eat aloe leaves to avoid contracting scurvy, while Rhodes organised a soup kitchen.

On 25 November, the British garrison launched an attack on the Boer redoubt at Carter's Ridge, west of the town. (Note: Carters Ridge is located West of Kimberley at 28°45′01″S 24°42′13″E) Kekewich's men held the belief that the action would assist Methuen's relief column at Magersfontein by keeping more Boers occupied at Kimberley. A detachment of 40 members of Cape Police and Light Horse under the command of Major Scott-Turner of the Black Watch set out at midnight and completely surprised their enemy in the early hours of the morning. Thirty-three Boers were captured at the cost of four killed. Scott-Turner tried to repeat the successful raid three days later, but it was a disaster for the British the second time round, with Scott-Turner among those killed.

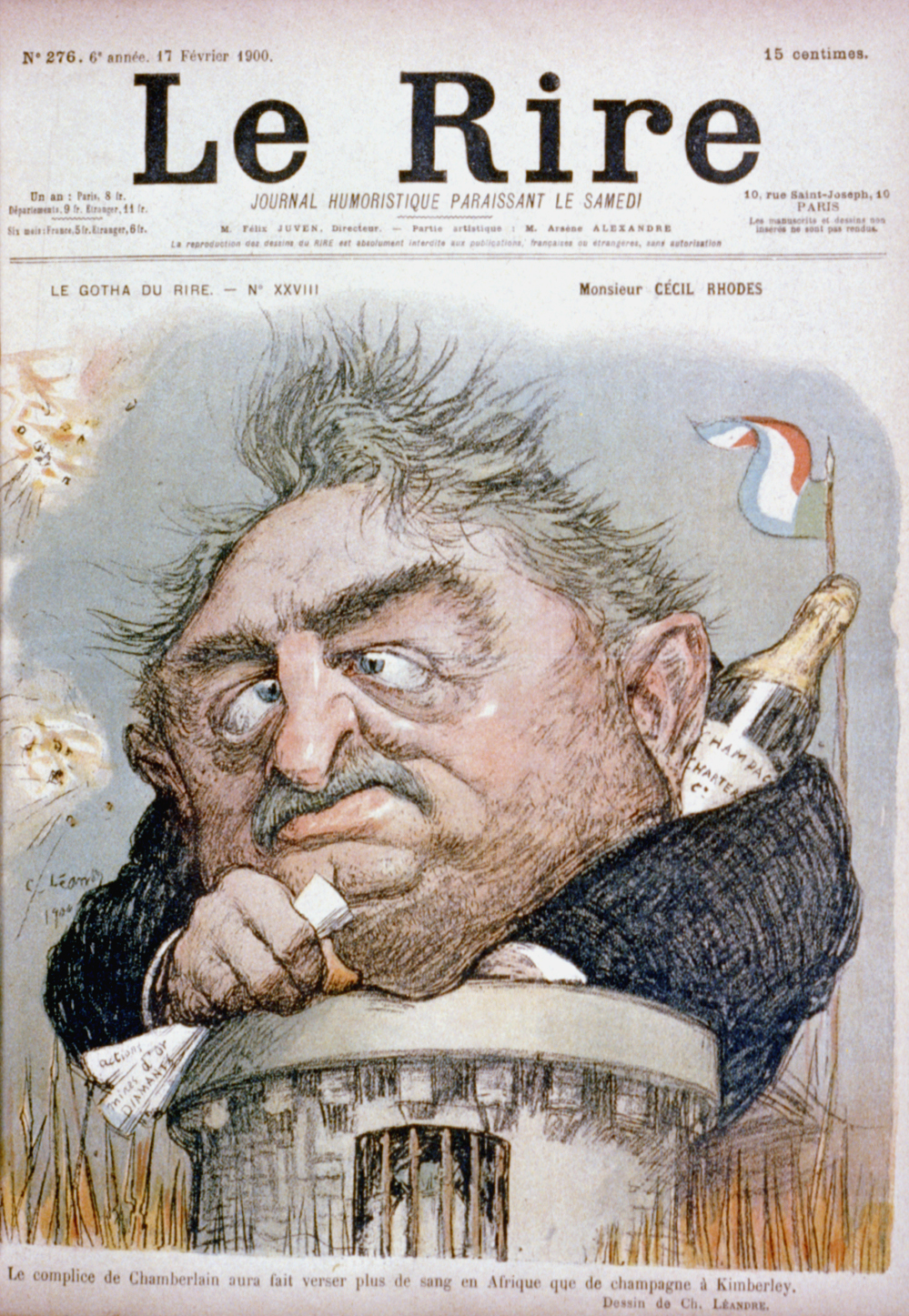
Contemporary French caricature of Rhodes, showing him trapped in Kimberley during the Second Boer War, seen emerging from a tower clutching papers with a champagne bottle behind his collar.

The engineers of Rhodes's company, under Chief Mechanical Engineer George Labram, were instrumental in the defence of the town. They manufactured fortifications, an armoured train, a watch tower, shells, and a gun, known as Long Cecil, for the defenders in order to supplement their inadequate weapons. Long Cecil was rifled with a bore of 100 millimetres (3.9 in) capable of propelling a 13-kilogram (29 lb) shell 6,000 metres (6,600 yd). The gun was completed on 21 January 1900, and successfully test fired against a previously untouchable Boer position north of the town.

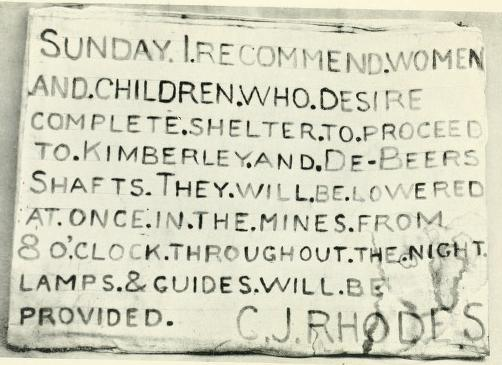
Rhodes's message to the residents of Kimberley, offering shelter in the Kimberley Mine

The Boers countered on 7 February with a much heavier 100-pounder named "Long Tom"; it had been disabled by British saboteurs at Ladysmith, before being repaired at Pretoria, and brought to Kimberley. In addition to having larger shells than any of the siege guns used up to that point, its longer range meant that it could also target any location in Kimberley. The town's inhabitants had become accustomed to shelling by smaller guns and were to some extent able to take shelter and to carry on their daily lives. The new gun immediately changed the status quo, as terrified residents were no longer able to find sanctuary anywhere at ground level. Rhodes published a notice inviting people to take shelter in the Kimberley Mine in order to avoid its lethal shelling. Fortunately for the defenders, the gun did not use smokeless powder, so observers were able to give residents up to 17 seconds warning to take cover when a shell was incoming. Labram was the most notable civilian casualty, when he was killed within a week of the end of the siege, ironically by a Boer shell from the Long Tom gun brought to counter his own gun. Kekewich arranged a full military funeral for him, which was well attended, but took place after dark for safety reasons; the procession was targeted by Boer shelling with the help of a traitor inside the town who lit the area with a flare.

The Boers besieged the town for 124 days, shelling it on most days, except Sundays. Shelling abated somewhat during the Battle of Magersfontein when the Boer siege guns were temporarily brought to bear there. Throughout the siege, Kekewich mounted numerous armed reconnaissance missions outside the town's defences, sometimes using the armoured train. Some of these engagements were fierce, with casualties on both sides, however they did not change the status quo. In January 1900, the local Boer command passed from Commandant Wessels to General Ignatius Stephanus Ferreira.

== Relief ==
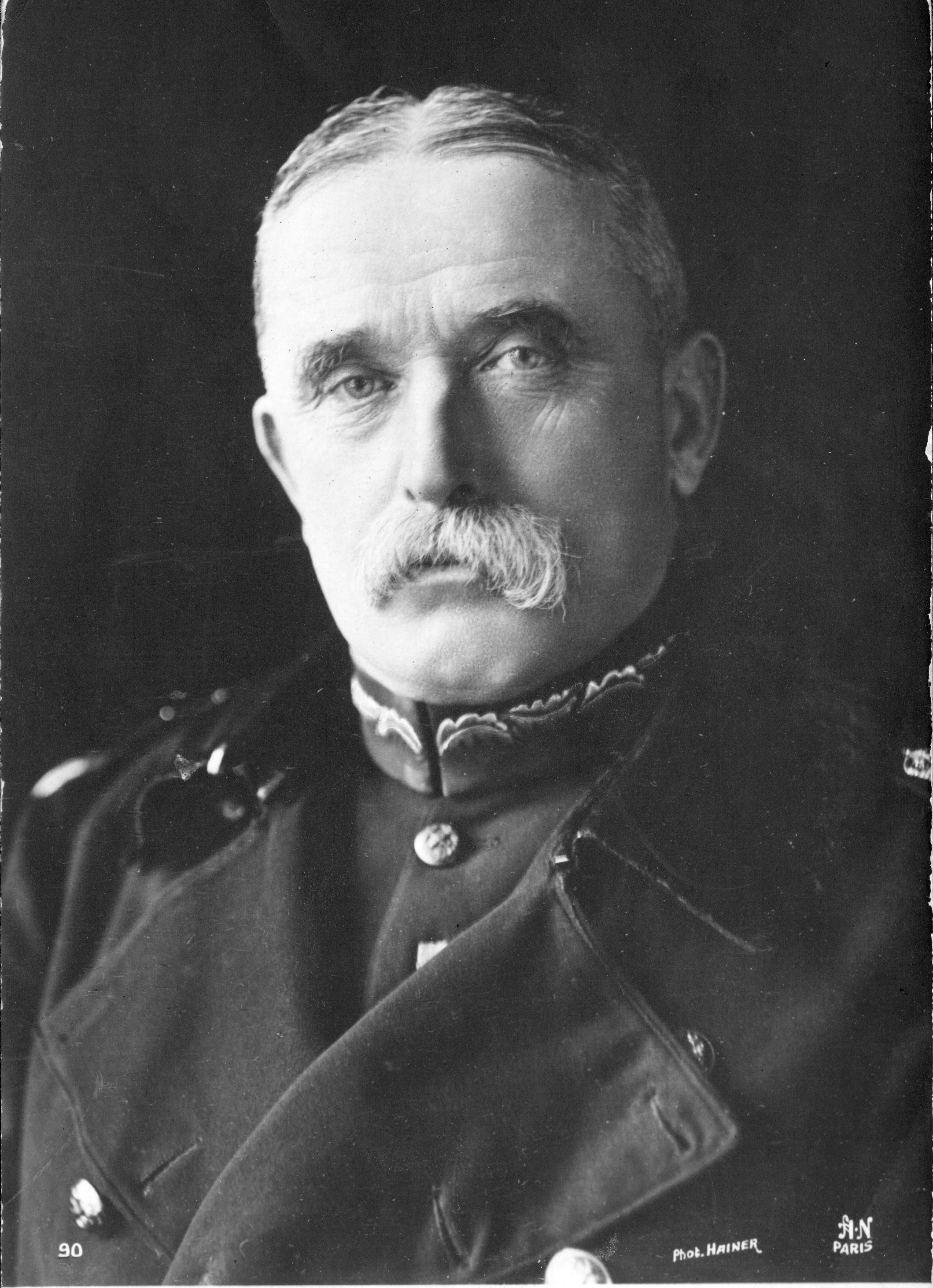
Major-General Sir J.D.P. French, whose cavalry division lifted the siege.

The British commander-in-chief in South Africa, General Sir Redvers Buller initially planned to march with a single large force on the Boer capitals of Bloemfontein and Pretoria. However public opinion demanded relief of the sieges of Kimberley, Ladysmith and Mafeking — pressure that was attributable in part to Rhodes's presence in Kimberley and lobbying in London. Buller therefore had to change his plans and divide his forces: Lord Methuen was sent north by the War Office in December 1899 with the objective of relieving Kimberley and Mafeking, while Buller himself went to Natal. On 1 December 1899, communications were established between Methuen's relief column and the defenders in the town. However, Methuen's advance ground to a halt after the Boers inflicted heavy casualties on his force at the Battle of Modder River and defeated him resoundingly at the Battle of Magersfontein. These, and other defeats elsewhere, came to be called "Black Week" by the British. Thus, for two of the four months of the siege, the 10,000 British troops at Modder River who were within 12 miles (19 km) of the town, were unable to reach it.

Field Marshal Lord Roberts replaced Buller as British Commander-in-Chief in South Africa in January 1900. Within a month Roberts assembled 30,000 infantry, 7,501 cavalry and 3,600 mounted infantry, together with 120 guns, in the area between the Orange and Modder Rivers. The largest British mounted division ever assembled was created under the command of Major-General John French through the amalgamation of virtually all the cavalry in the area. News of the shelling by the Boer Long Tom gun had reached Lord Roberts, whose parting words to his officers on 9 February were that "You must relieve Kimberley if it costs you half your forces."

Piet Cronjé believed that Roberts would attempt to attack him in a flanking manoeuvre from the west, and that the advance would largely continue as before along the railway line. With this mind, Roberts ordered the Highland Brigade 20 miles (32 km) west to Koedoesberg, (Note: Koedoesberg is at 28°55′00″S 24°25′00″E) thereby encouraging Cronjé's forces to believe that the attack would occur there. However, the bulk of the force initially headed south to Graspan, (Note: Graspan is located south of Kimberley at 29°19′08″S 24°26′51″E) then east deep into the Orange Free State with the cavalry division guarding the British right flank by securing drifts across the Riet River. On 13 February, Roberts activated the second part of his plan, that involved French's cavalry separating from the slower main force and piercing forward quickly by swinging northwards, just east of Jacobsdal, to cross the Modder River at Klip Drift. (Note: Klip Drif is south-east of Kimberley on the Modder River at 29°02′30.5″S 24°53′41.4″E one of the few crossings in the area)

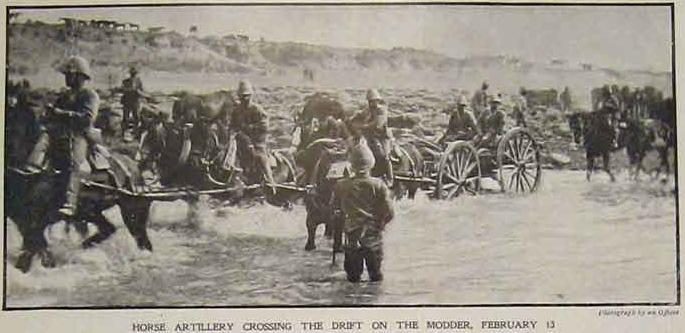
French's cavalry crossing the Modder River after charging to Klip Drift on their way to Kimberley

As French's column neared the Modder River on 13 February, a force of about 1,000 Boers made contact with his right flank. French wheeled his right and centre brigades towards their enemy, thereby allowing the brigade on the left to hold course for Klip Drift, while giving the enemy the false impression that he was headed for Klipkraal Drift. The whole force then wheeled left at the last minute and charged the Klip Drift crossing at full gallop. The Boers at Klip Drift, who were taken completely by surprise, left their camp and provisions behind, which French's exhausted men and horses were glad to seize. Although speed was important, the cavalry had to wait for the infantry to catch up to secure the lines of communication before moving forward to relieve Kimberley. The cavalry's route had taken them deep inside the Free State over Cronjé's line of communication, thereby cutting off any Boer forces who did not immediately fall back. Meanwhile, Roberts led the main force in an easterly direction with the objective of capturing the Orange Free State capital, Bloemfontein.

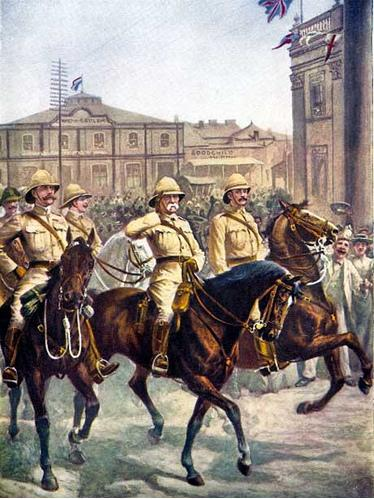
Lord Roberts entering Kimberley in February 1900 following the lifting of the siege

French's flanking manoeuvre took a very high toll on horses and men in the blazing summer heat, with about 500 horses either dying en route or no longer fit to ride. When Cronjé became aware of French's cavalry on his left flank at Klip Drift, he concluded that the British were trying to draw him eastwards away from his prepared defences. He dispatched 900 men with guns to stop the British push northwards. French's men set out from Klip Drift at 9:30 am on 15 February on the last stage of their journey to Kimberley, and were soon engaged by the Boer force sent to block them. Rifle fire came from the river in the east while artillery shells rained from the hills in the north west; the route to Kimberley lay straight ahead through the crossfire, so French ordered a bold cavalry charge down the middle. As waves of horses galloped forward, the Boers poured down fire from the two sides. However, the speed of the attack, screened by a massive cloud of dust, proved successful and the Boer force was defeated. British casualties during this day's fighting were five dead and 10 wounded, with roughly 70 horses lost through exhaustion. However, the route to Kimberley was open; by that evening, General French and his men passed through the recently abandoned Boer lines, and relieved the town of Kimberley after some initial difficulty in convincing the defenders via heliograph that they were not Boers. The cavalry had covered 120 miles (190 km) in four days at the height of summer to reach the town. When French arrived in town, he snubbed Kekewich, the local military authority, by presenting himself to Rhodes instead.

French's men did not have much opportunity to relax when they reached the town, as they were roused during their first night in the town first to make yet another dash to try to capture the Long Tom gun and, in the early hours of 17 February, to cut off Cronjé's main force, who had abandoned Magersfontein and were heading east towards Bloemfontein along the Modder River. Kitchener directed French to cut off the Boers' escape; of French's original strength of 5,000, only 1,200 of his cavalrymen were still fit, while the horses were depleted. At first light, the cavalry headed towards the Boer dust clouds; soon they were overlooking a whole valley full of Boers, with cattle, 400 wagons and women and children in tow. The surprise was complete when the British started shelling the Boer column just as it started crossing the Modder River at Paardeberg Drift, causing considerable confusion and panic. Cronjé elected to sit tight rather than escape, giving French the opportunity to summon reinforcements before the Boers realised how small and depleted the force was that was harassing them. The Battle of Paardeberg ensued over the next week, resulting in the defeat of Cronjé, but at the expense of a considerable amount of British blood.

== Aftermath ==
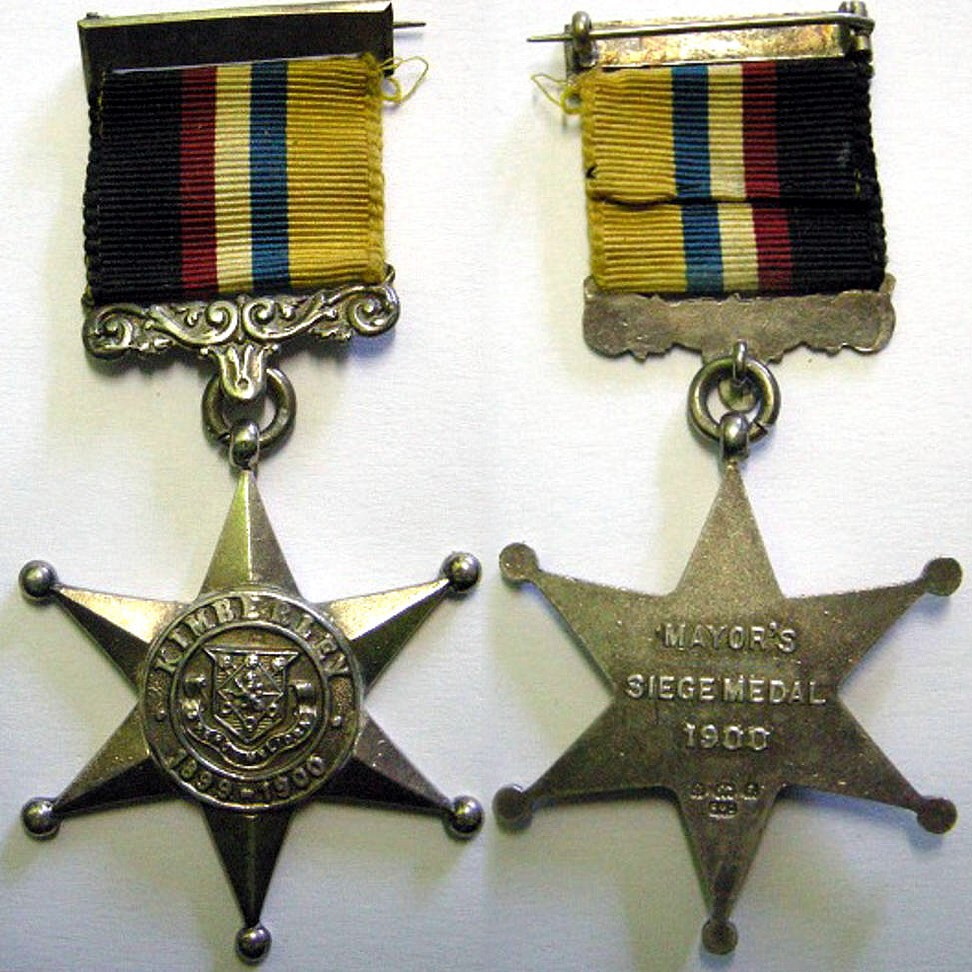
Kimberley Star

On 17 February, Kekewich was promoted to the rank of full colonel while French was promoted to major general. A number of medals were issued to combatants, notably the Kimberley Star, which was instituted by Mayor H. A. Oliver. Since the medal was not an official one, it could not be worn with military uniforms. The official awards for the siege and relief of Kimberley were, respectively, the "Defence of Kimberley" and "Relief of Kimberley" clasps to the Queen's South Africa Medal.

A camp for Boer refugees from Griqualand West was established in Kimberly as early as December 1899. On 4 January 1901, the town commandant of Kimberley formally established a concentration camp for captive Boer civilians, which was administered by the Kimberley Regiment. The camp's prisoners consisted of families of Boer troops from across the Cape Colony, Free State, Transvaal and Bechuanaland along with Black refugees. It was formally closed on 9 January 1903, when all remaining prisoners were released. A memorial outside the Newton Dutch Reformed Church commemorates those that died in the camp.

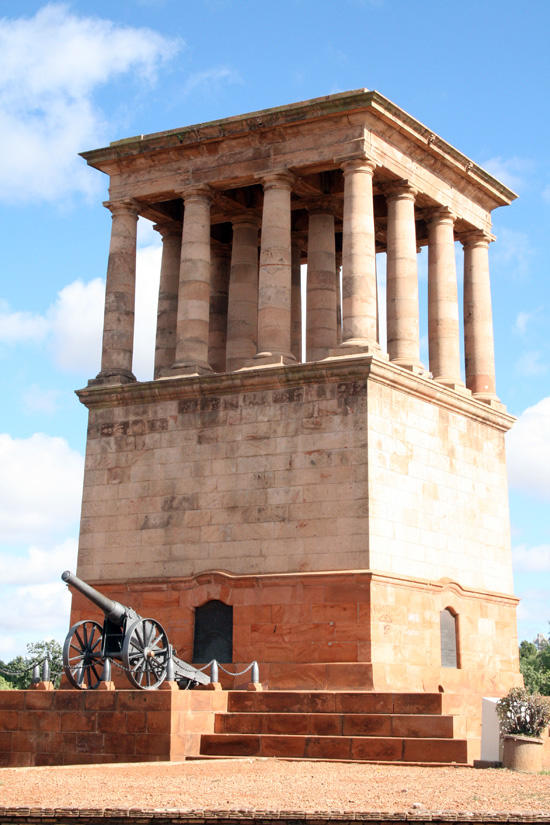
The Honoured Dead Memorial in Kimberley

The Honoured Dead Memorial, a sandstone edifice commissioned by Cecil Rhodes and designed by Sir Herbert Baker, was erected to commemorate the defenders who fell during the siege. Twenty-seven soldiers are entombed in the memorial, which was made from stone quarried in the Matopo Hills in Rhodesia (today Zimbabwe). It bears an inscription by Rudyard Kipling: “This for a charge to our children in sign of the price we paid, The price that we paid for freedom that comes unsoiled to your hand; Read, revere and uncover, here are the victors laid, They who died for their City, being sons of the land”. Long Cecil, the gun manufactured in the De Beers workshops during the siege, is mounted on the stylobate (facing the Free State), surrounded by shells from the Boer Long Tom.

The Sanatorium Hotel, in which Cecil Rhodes stayed during the siege, is the present-day site of the McGregor Museum. The stone that he used to mount his horse is still in the gardens, while the story of the siege is covered extensively in the permanent exhibitions of the museum.

== See also ==
- Kimberley Regiment
