= George Labram =

George Frederick Labram
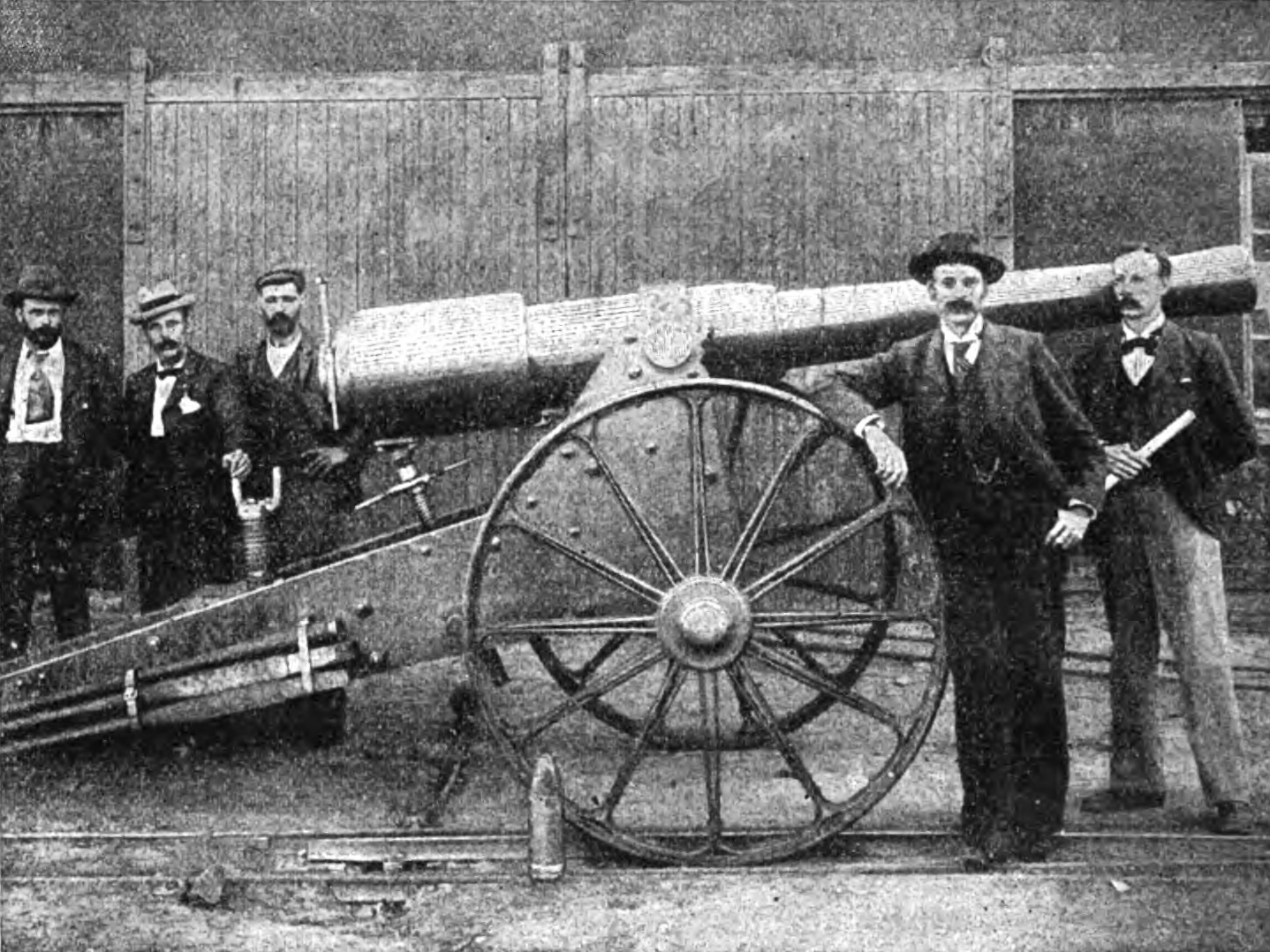
- Labram leaning on Long Cecil
- Born: 1859; Detroit, United States
- Died: 1900-02-09; Grand Hotel, Kimberley, Cape Colony
- Cause of death: Shrapnel from artillery shell
- Resting place: Gladstone cemetery, Kimberley
- Occupation: Engineer
- Employer: De Beers
- Known for: Construction of Long Cecil gun during the Siege of Kimberley; Invention of new diamond mining techniques

George Labram (1859-1900) was an American engineer employed as Chief Mechanical Engineer at the De Beers diamond mines in Kimberley during the Siege of Kimberley.

== Early life ==
Labram was born in Detroit, Michigan in 1859, but attended school at the Quincy Mine after his parents moved there around 1864.

== Career ==
Labram started his working career at Samuel F. Hodge & Company in Detroit before moving to Chicago where he first worked at the MC Bullock Manufacturing Company and later at Fraser & Chalmers. From Chicago Labram moved to the Silver King Mine in Arizona and then became mechanical engineer on a smelter for Anaconda Copper. Following that Labram worked at Boston and Montana Consolidated Copper and Silver Mining Company for a short period before moving to the Butte and Boston Consolidated Mining Company where he worked for about a year as engineer in charge of machinery before moving to Dakota to erect a tin mill. At the World's Columbian Exposition in 1893 Labram ran a machinery exhibition.

In 1893 Labram was employed by the De Beers company in Kimberley to build and manage a crushing mill. In 1898 he was promoted to chief engineer. Under Labram's supervision as manager of the crushing plant, Fred Kirsten devised an automated diamond extraction process. Up to that time all diamonds were manually extracted by sight.

== Second Boer War ==
During 1899 Labram assisted Major General Kekewich in preparing Kimberley's defenses prior to the city's siege; including the construction of a 155-foot (47 m) high watch tower, search lights and a telephone system.

Labram installed an emergency fresh-water supply system for the town, and designed a bulk refrigeration plant for perishable foodstuffs specifically for the storage of meat from cattle that had to be slaughtered as it could no longer be let to pasture.

During the siege Labram also built two armoured trains, manufactured munitions for the existing artillery available in the city, and built the one-off cannon affectionately named Long Cecil, after the chairman of De Beers, Cecil Rhodes. Many of the tools needed for the manufacture of the gun had to also be manufactured in the De Beers workshop.

Long Cecil was rifled with a bore of 4.1 inches (100 mm) capable of propelling a 28.5 pounds (12.9 kg) shell over 6,500 yards (5,900 m).

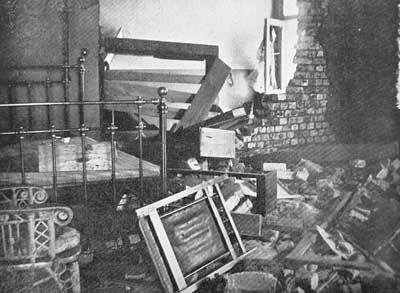
George Labram's room in the Grand Hotel, Kimberley in which he was killed by a Boer shell

Labram was killed on 9 February 1900, less than a week before the siege was lifted, by a Boer shell that hit his room in the Grand Hotel on Market Square. Kekewich gave Labram a full military funeral, that was attended by thousands despite Boer shelling specifically targeting the procession.

De Beers provided well for Labram's widow and son after his death, with Mrs Labram receiving $500 per year for the remainder of her life and their 13-year-old son $1000 per year until he came of age. Great Britain also granted Mrs. Labram a once-off sum of £1,000 for the services her husband rendered during the siege.

The importance of the role Labram played in the defence of Kimberley is probably best expressed in a letter from Robert Kekewich to Mrs. Labram:

Dear Madam: It was with great grief that I received the sad intelligence on February 9 that your husband, Mr. George Labram, has been killed by a Boer shell. I write to offer you and your son the deepest sympathy of my staff and myself in the severe loss you have sustained. Not only Kimberley, but the whole British nation, is to-day indebted to your late husband for the valuable assistance he afforded to the defenders of Kimberley during a siege extending nearly four months. Your late husband placed unreservedly at my disposal his great genius, and I can not sufficiently express my gratitude for the many works he completed, which have much assisted me to prolong the defense of Kimberley. I can assure you my dear madam, that the whole of Kimberley mourns the loss of our dear friend George Labram as we would the loss of a dear relative. Yours, sincerely,

— KEKEWICH, Lieutenant-Colonel, Commanding the Troops at Kimberley

The one request from the people of Kimberley that Labram was unable to deliver on was to produce some whiskey.

== Legacy ==
Legacy

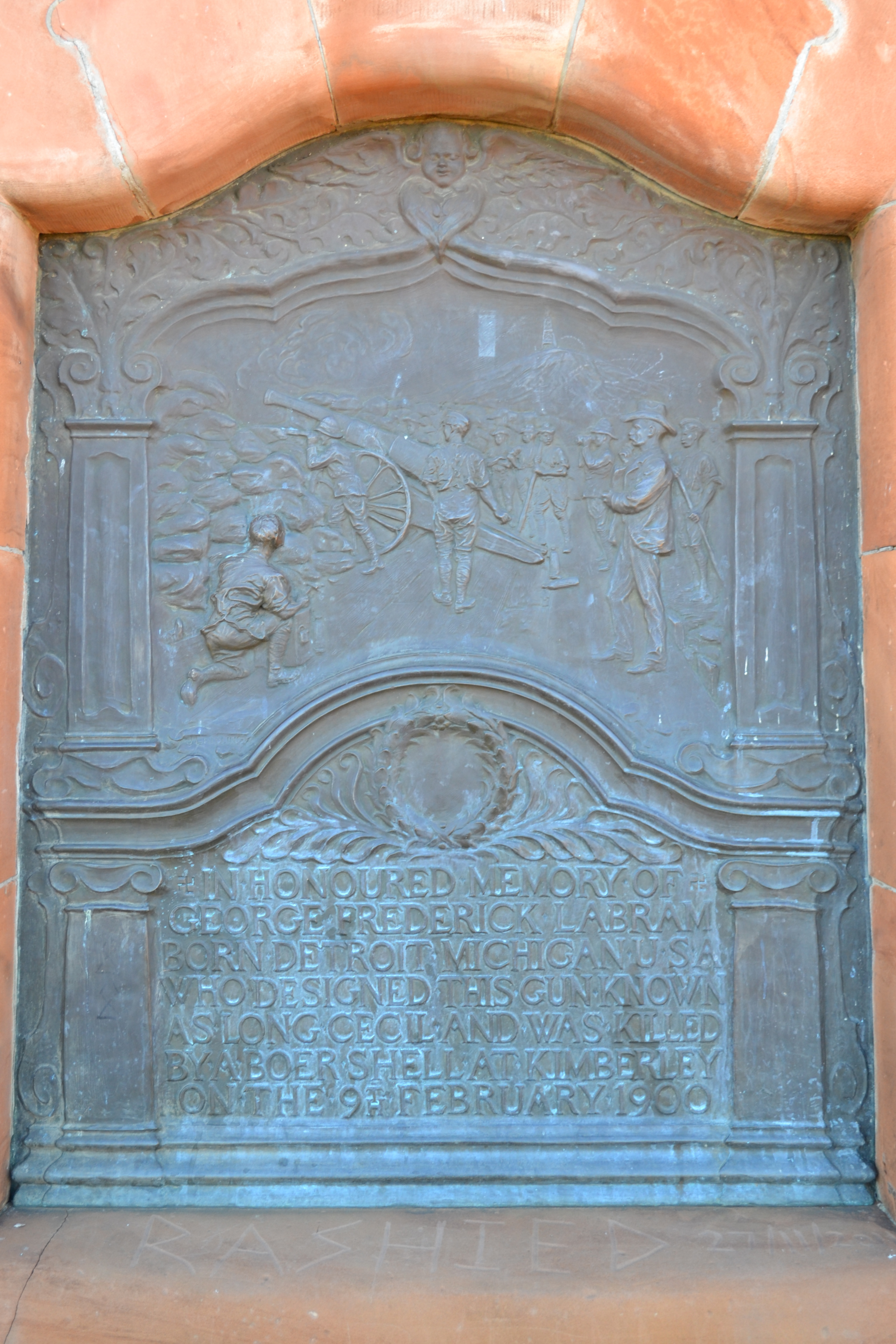
Memorial plaque to George Labram on the Honoured Dead Memorial

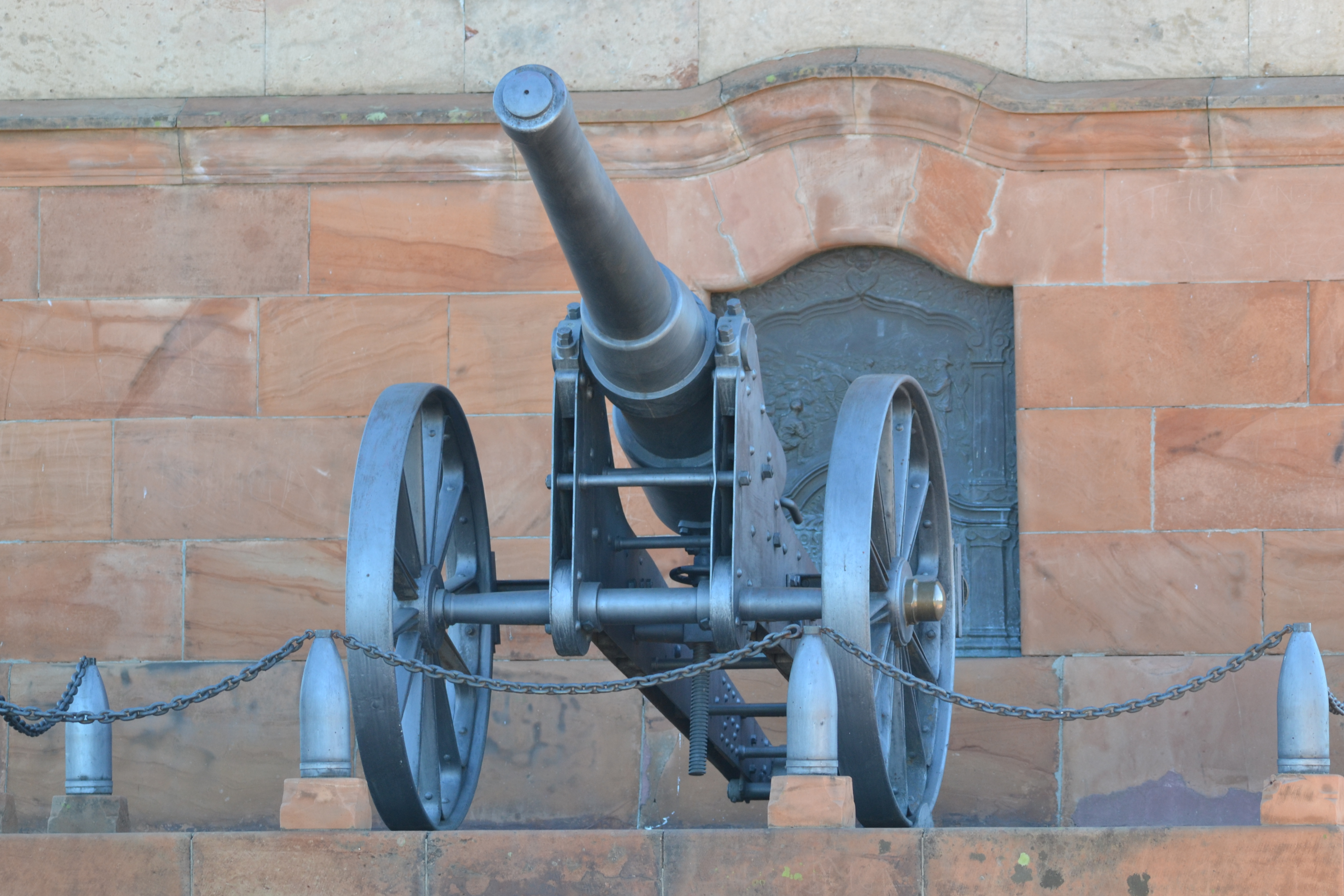
Long Cecil on the Honoured Dead Memorial

The modern day suburb of Labram in Kimberley is named after George Labram. The Honoured Dead Memorial, which prominently features Long Cecil and a memorial plaque to George Labram on its stylobate, is situated adjacent to the neighbourhood.

The memorial plaque reads

IN HONOURED MEMORY OF
GEORGE FREDERICK LABRAM
BORN DETROIT MICHIGAN USA
WHO DESIGNED THIS GUN KNOWN
AS LONG CECIL AND WAS KILLED
BY A BOER SHELL AT KIMBERLEY
ON THE 9TH FEBRUARY 1900
