= Italian South Africans =

Italian community in South Africa

Italo-sudafricani (Italian)

Total population
- 77,400 (0.1-2% of South Africa’s population)

Regions with significant populations
- Johannesburg, Umkomaas, Edenvale, Cape Town other main city centres.

Languages
- South African English; Afrikaans; Italian; other Italian dialects; languages of Italian historical minorities

Religion
- Predominantly Roman Catholicism

Related ethnic groups
- Italians, Italian Algerians, Italian Angolans, Italian Egyptians, Italian Eritreans, Italian Ethiopians, Italian Libyans, Italian Moroccans, Italian Mozambicans, Italian Somalis, Italian Tunisians, Italian Zimbabweans, Italian Americans, Italian Canadians, Italian British, Italian Australians

Italian South Africans (Italian: italo-sudafricani) are South African-born citizens who are fully or partially of Italian descent, whose ancestors were Italians who immigrated to South Africa during the Italian diaspora, or Italian-born people in South Africa. They are primarily descended from Italians who immigrated to South Africa during the late 19th century and early 20th century.

== History ==
Apart from a few Catholic missionaries, Italian immigration to South Africa was very limited until the end of the 19th century. Some Italian traders, such as Theresa Viglione, were present in small numbers alongside the Boers, when they made their Great Trek towards the Transvaal and Natal, but only in the early 20th century did the Italians form a small community of about 5,000 people, concentrated in the major cities of the Union of South Africa.

In 1900, there were 200 Italians in the Cape Colony and before 1910 about 1,200 in the Transvaal which was hugely reduced after the support given by Camillo Ricchiardi's Italian Volunteer Legion to the Boer insurgents. Many were miners (gold prospectors), traders and builders. However, already in 1915, there were almost 4,000 Italians in all of South Africa, and among them many were professionals such as engineers, doctors and lawyers. Italian immigrants mainly found employment as stonemasons, bricklayers, craftsmen, carpenters, metal workers and railway workers.

During Fascism there was almost no Italian emigration to South Africa, and at the outbreak of World War II about 800 Italian South Africans were interned for security reasons.

With World War II and Italy's entry into the war against England, it was the beginning of a difficult period for the Italian community in South Africa: in fact, the government of General Smuts allied itself with the British and interned around 800 Italians, with Germans and Afrikaners, in various concentration camps. During the first half of 1941, the first prisoners of war also arrived, the number of which reached 90,000. The huge field that hosted them, Zonderwater (which means "without water"), a real prison-city, still exists and every year, in the month of November, the official ceremony of commemoration of the deceased takes place to honor the over 400 prisoners buried there. At the end of the conflict, from May 1945, the surviving compatriots began to be repatriated but 800 chose to stay and another 20,000 returned.

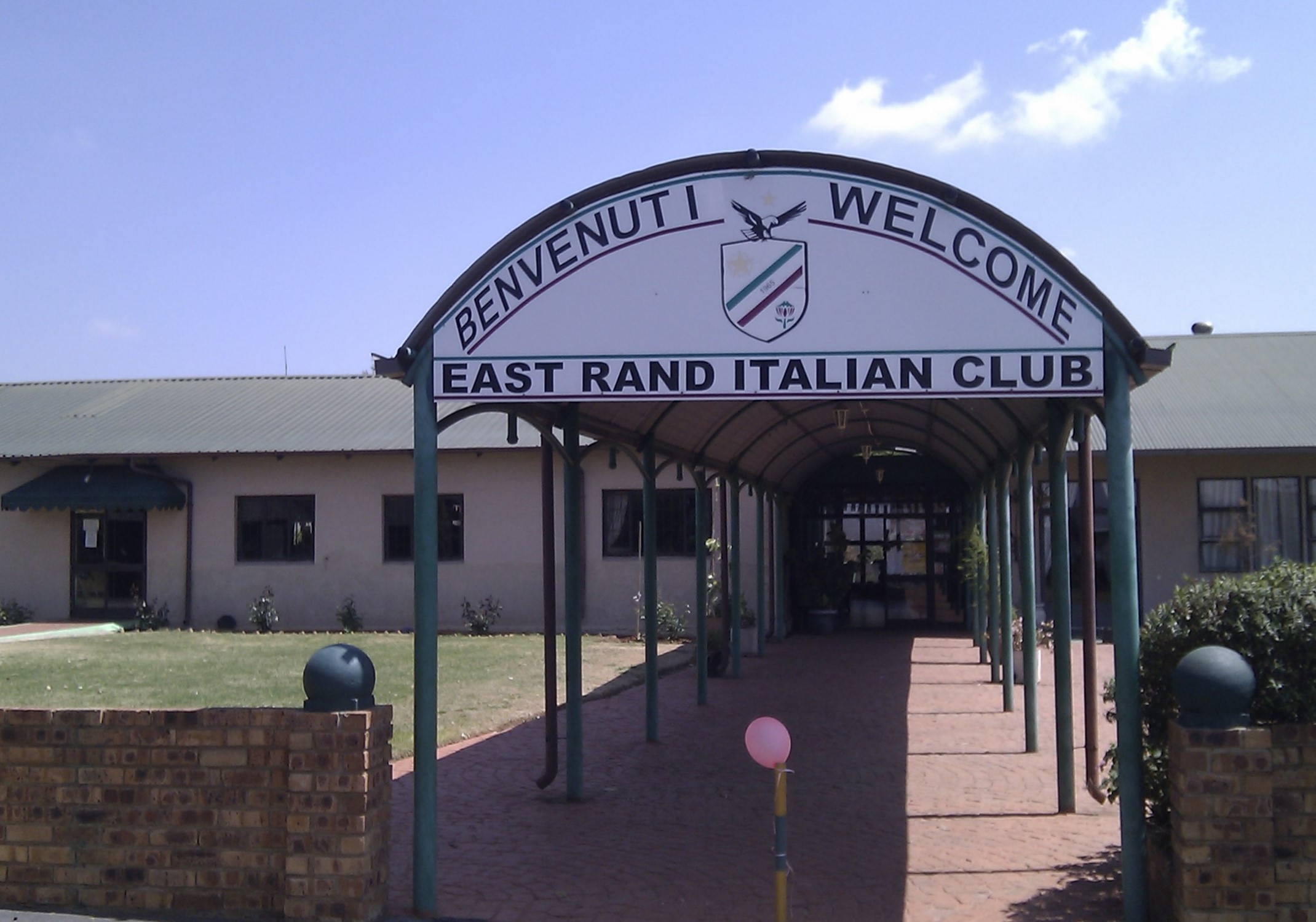
Italian Club in Boksburg, South Africa

At the end of the 1940s, many thousands of Italian ex-internees, who had established working relationships with South Africans during their imprisonment, decided to immigrate to South Africa. This was the case of the father of Italian South African runner Marcello Fiasconaro, an Italian pilot shot down during a bombing in Kenya and interned in Zonderwater. Numerous families of Istrian-Dalmatian exiles reached South Africa.

In the 1950s, the South African government began to favor the immigration of Italians, who settled mainly in the Cape Province. Subsequently, with the beginning of Apartheid, a selected flow of Italians was promoted, also with the aim of increasing the white population in South Africa.

In the early 1970s, there were over 40,000 Italians in South Africa, scattered throughout the provinces but concentrated in the main cities. Some of these Italians had taken refuge in South Africa, escaping the decolonization of Rhodesia and other African states.

In the 1990s, a period of crisis began for Italian South Africans and many returned to Europe; however, the majority successfully integrated into the multiracial society of contemporary South Africa.

The Italian community consists of over 77,400 people (0.1–2% of South Africa's population), half of whom have Italian citizenship. Those of Venetian origin number about 5,000, mainly residing in Johannesburg, while the most numerous Italian regional communities are the southern ones. The official Italian registry records 28,059 Italians residing in South Africa in 2007, excluding South Africans with dual citizenship.

== Italian press and institutions in South Africa ==
The Italian-language press in South Africa essentially consists of three publications:

- La Gazzetta del Sudafrica ("The Gazette of South Africa"), daily newspaper (Cape Town, since 2006), publisher Ciro Migliore.
- Insieme ("Together"), bimonthly (Durban, since 1989), publisher Comites Kwazulu Natal and Consulate of Italy in Durban.
- La Voce ("The Voice"), weekly (Johannesburg, since 1975), publisher Pier Luigi Porciani (owned by AIISA).

The most important Italian associations and institutions in South Africa are:

- The Associazione Assistenziale Italiana ("Italian Welfare Association") of Johannesburg, the Unitas (Unione Italiana Assistenza, "Italian Assistance Union") of Durban and the Fondo Assistenza Italiana ("Italian Assistance Fund") of Cape Town.
- The Circolo Ricreativo Anziani Italiani ("Italian Elderly Recreational Club") of Johannesburg and the Circolo Anziani ("Elderly Club") of Cape Town.
- The Johannesburg Italian Ladies Society of Italian-South African women.
- Casa Serena ("peaceful home"), a rest home for the elderly, wanted and built with direct funding from Italians from South Africa and partially supported by the Italian and South African governments.
- The Scuola italiana del Capo ("Cape Italian School") in Cape Town and Port Elizabeth.
- The Dante Alighieri Society, present in Johannesburg, Cape Town, Durban and Pietermaritzburg which spreads the Italian culture and language in South Africa.
- The Circolo Culturale Italo Sudafricano ("Italian South African Cultural Circle") and other Italian social clubs in: Johannesburg, Pretoria, Cape Town, Durban, Benoni, Nigel, Vereeniging, Umkomaas, Ladysmith, Port Elizabeth and East London.

== Notable Italian South Africans ==
=== Sport ===
- Carlo Del Fava, South African-born Italian former rugby union player
- Lorenzo Masselli, South African-born Italian former rugby union player
- Giulio Giuricich, South African footballer
- Alessio Angelucci, South African baseball player
- Davide Somma, South African footballer
- Dino Quattrocecere, South African figure skater
- Ramon di Clemente, South African rower and Olympic medalist
- Dylan Frittelli, South African golfer
- Rory Sabbatini, South African golfer
- Hugh Baiocchi, South African golfer
- Orazio Cremona, South African shot-putter
- Oscar Pistorius, former professional sprinter
- Giulio Zorzi, South African swimmer
- Andrew Northcote, South African-born Italian cricketer (born to an Italian South African mother)
- Angelo Gigli, South African-born Italian basketball player
- Dario Chistolini, South African-born Italian rugby union player
- Damian Crowley, South African-born Italian cricketer (born to an Italian South African mother)
- Eddie Firmani, South African-born Italian former footballer
- Marcello Fiasconaro, South African-Italian former athlete and one-time men's 800 metres world record holder
- Jade Dernbach, South African-born English Cricketer (born to an Italian mother and South African father)
- Craig Bianchi, South African former footballer
- JJ Gagiano, South African-born American rugby union player
- Vince Pennazza, South African-born Italian cricketer
- Mike Bernardo, South African kickboxer and boxer
- Zane Weir, South African-born Italian shot putter
- Braam Steyn, South African-born Italian rugby union player

=== Business ===
- Desmond Sacco, chairman and Managing Director of Assore Limited
- Rossano Giunti, Managing Director of Knysna Paradise Collection

=== Radio & TV ===
- Amor Vittone, Afrikaans singer and TV presenter (Italian father)
- Debora Patta, broadcast journalist and television producer
- Tullio Moneta, actor
- Vittorio Leonardi, South African stand-up comedian and actor
- Karin Giannone, South African-born BBC English television newsreader

=== Politics ===
- Belinda Bozzoli
- Mario Oriani-Ambrosini, constitutional lawyer and politician of the Inkatha Freedom Party
- Natasha Mazzone, South African politician and Chief Whip of the Official Opposition (since 2019)
- Elizabeth Maria Molteno
- John Charles Molteno
- John Charles Molteno, Jr.
- James Tennant Molteno

=== Other ===
- Carlo Gagiano, former Chief of the South African Air Force
- Don Mattera, anti-apartheid activist, poet and author
- Edoardo Villa, South African sculptor
- David Ferraris, racehorse trainer

== See also ==
- Italian diaspora
- Italy–South Africa relations
- White South Africans
- Italian Zimbabweans
- Italian Americans
- Italian Canadians
- Italian Australians
- Italians
- White Africans

== Bibliography ==
- Sani, Gabrielle (1992). History of the Italians in South Africa, 1489-1989. Zonderwater Block.
