= Boer foreign volunteers =

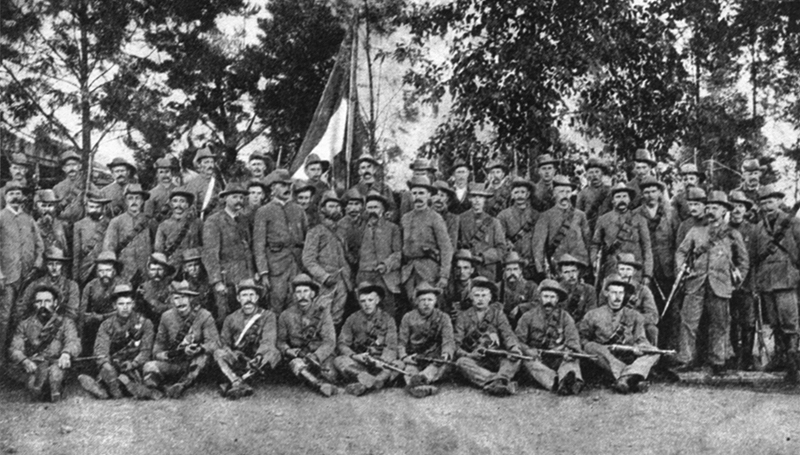
- Volunteers from Scandinavia in 1901
- Active: 1899–1902
- Allegiance: Orange Free State; South African Republic
- Type: Commandos
- Role: Guerrilla warfare
- Size: 5,400+
- Engagements: Second Boer War

Boer foreign volunteers were participants who volunteered their military services to the Boers in the Second Boer War.

== Origin ==
Although there was much international sympathy for the Boer cause, there was little official support as governments proved mostly unwilling to upset the United Kingdom. As a result, no other nation actively supported the Boer cause. There were, however, individuals from several countries who volunteered and formed Foreign Volunteer Units. These volunteers primarily came from Europe, particularly the Netherlands, Germany, Austria-Hungary and Sweden-Norway. Other countries such as France, Italy, Ireland (then part of the United Kingdom), and restive areas of the Russian Empire, including Poland and Georgia, also formed smaller volunteer corps. Finns fought in the Scandinavian Corps.

== Recruitment ==
The influx of foreigners into the country began simultaneously with the war, and it continued thereafter at the rate of about four hundred men a month. These volunteers would have come for a number of reasons, not necessarily because of any sympathy with the Boer cause, including soldiers-of-fortune, professional soldiers and adventurers. Some of the more famous volunteers were:

Ernest Douwes Dekker, Camillo Ricchiardi, Yevgeny Maximov, Niko the Boer (Niko Bagrationi), Yevgeny Avgustus, Witold Ścibor-Rylski, Alexander Guchkov, Leo Pokrowsky, Major Baron von Reitzenstein, Viscount Villebois-Mareuil and the men of the two Irish commandos, the Irish Transvaal Brigade of John MacBride and John Blake, and the Second Irish Brigade of Arthur Alfred Lynch.

None of the foreigners who served in the armies of the Transvaal and the Orange Free State received any compensation. They were supplied with horses, equipment, and food from the Transvaal government, but no wages. Before a foreign volunteer was allowed to join a commando, and before he received his equipment, he was obliged to take an oath of allegiance to the Transvaal Republic. A translation of it reads:

I hereby make an oath of solemn allegiance to the people of the South African Republic, and I declare my willingness to assist, with all my power, the burghers of this Republic in the war in which they are engaged. I further promise to obey the orders of those placed in authority according to law, and that I will work for nothing but the prosperity, the welfare, and the independence of the land and people of this Republic, so truly help me, God Almighty.

== Second Boer War ==
At the time of the outbreak of war, the Boers did not have the resources to record statistics about their forces. The statistics available were mainly collected by foreigners and by the testimony of the commanders. Table of foreign volunteers in the Second Anglo-Boer War:

Number	Nationality
2,000 (Note: Speech by the South African ambassador in The Hague on the 31st of May 1938, during the Dutch Remembrance of the Dead-Day of the Second Boer War. In the Netherlands, there was a special Remembrance Day between 1910 and 1939. This Remembrance Day was held on the 31st of May and was in honour of the Boer/Afrikaner and Dutch dead of the Second Boer War.)	Dutch (the unit included Belgians)
1,200	Anglo-Irish (UK)
550-600	Germans
400	French
300	Irish Americans (U.S.)
230-300	Scandinavians
200+	Russians
119	Italians
14-60	Greeks
few	Australians
7,400+	Known total*

In the early stages of the war the majority of the foreign volunteers were obliged to join a Boer commando. Later they formed their own foreign legions with a high degree of independence, including the: Scandinavian Corps (Skandinaviens Korps), Italian Volunteer Legion, two Irish Brigades, German Corps (Deutsches Korps), Dutch Corps, Legion of France, American Scouts and Russian Scouts.

=== Foreign volunteer units ===
==== Hollander Corps ====
Dutch volunteers established the Hollander Corps in the South African Republic. A number of Belgians, under the chairmanship of Dr G.M.A. Heymans, also joined the unit in September 1899. Volunteers included Herman Coster, who became a celebrated figure in the Netherlands after his death in the war; Cornelis Vincent 'Cor' van Gogh, the brother of the artist Vincent van Gogh; and Willem Frederik Mondriaan, the brother of the artist Piet Mondrian. The Hollander Corps was involved at the Battle of Elandslaagte in October 1899. After that defeat, the Hollander Corps was disbanded and merged into other Boer units. A group calling themselves the Second Hollander Corps was founded in 1900 and joined the forces of the Orange Free State. The Dutch Corps Monument was erected by the citizens of the Netherlands in memory of their countrymen who died in the Battle of Elandslaagte.

==== Scandinavian Corps ====
The Scandinavian Corps was founded by railway engineer Christer Uggla at the outbreak of the Second Boer War in 1899, and was part of the Army of the Transvaal Boer Republic. The Corps consisted of 114 men, including officers, of which 46 from Sweden, 13 from Norway, 24 from Denmark, 18 from Finland, 7 from Germany, 4 from The Netherlands, 1 from Russia, and 1 from Italy. Of the soldiers, none were professionals, but many were seamen. An ambulance unit was attached to the Corps consisting of 4 men and 4 women, led by the physician Wilhelm Biedenkap from Oslo.

The Corps was commanded by Captain Johannes Flygare (a Swede from Natal) and lieutenants Erik Stålberg (from Delsbo in Sweden) and William Baerentsen (from Copenhagen). Of these only Stålberg had any military background.

The Corps partook in the siege of Mafeking in October and November as well as in the Battle of Magersfontein 10–11 December 1899, where it suffered heavy losses, as it faced several Scottish elite regiments from the Highland Brigade, and was immensely outnumbered. The Boer soldiers were entrenched and inflicted a severe defeat upon the advancing British force; the Scandinavians however were positioned around 1500 meters in front of the main line. The fallen were buried on site, and several monuments were erected there. One reads "De kunde icke vika, blott falla kunde de. (They could not fold, they could only fall)", a reference to the poem Karl XII by Esaias Tegner. Those Scandinavians who were taken prisoner were brought through the naval base Simonstown to Ceylon or to the prison island Saint Helena. After the battle the Corps was supplied with 20 men, and the Dane Jens Friis was appointed Captain and commander. The Corps was part of the Boer forces under General Piet Cronje who surrendered at Paardeberg in February 1900.

General Cronje reported after the victory in the battle at Magersfontein: "Next to God the (Boer) Republics have the Scandinavian Corps to thank for the victory".

==== German Corps ====
Adolf Schiel led the German Corps and was one of the Boer leaders at the Battle of Elandslaagte. Schiel was wounded at the battle and taken as a prisoner of war.

==== Legion of France ====
However, the free rein given to the foreign legions was eventually curtailed after George Henri Anne-Marie Victor de Villebois-Mareuil and his small band of Frenchmen met with disaster at Boshof, and thereafter all the foreigners were placed under the direct command of General De la Rey.

==== American Scouts ====
The American Scouts were led by John Hassell.

==== Italian Volunteer Legion ====
The Italian Volunteer Legion of Camillo Ricchiardi carried out the capture of an armoured train near Chieveley, Natal. Among the passengers who were taken prisoner was the young journalist Winston Churchill, whose life Ricchiardi spared by pretending not to see him dumping his pistol and dum-dum ammunition which had been declared unlawful on pain of death.

==== Irish Transvaal Brigade ====
Irish support for the Boers went back to 1877, when several Irish MPs, including reformer Charles Stuart Parnell expressed their opposition to laws which would annex the South African Republic to the British Empire. Although their efforts ultimately were unsuccessful, support remained high for the South African Republic in Ireland during the First Boer War; especially in 1881 following the decisive British defeat at the Battle of Majuba Hill where an Irishman, Alfred Aylward, served as an adviser to the victorious Boer General Piet Joubert during the battle. When rumours of a second war with the Boers began to surface, protesters led by James Connolly took to the streets in Dublin in August 1899 and public meetings were held across Ireland in support of the Boers. Several weeks later in Dublin a crowd of nearly 20,000 marched in protest against the planned invasion of the South African Republic.

The Irish Transvaal Brigade was established days before the outbreak of the Second Boer War and initially consisted of Irishmen who worked in the Witwatersrand. These volunteers were given full citizenship and became Burghers of the Boer republics. Under the leadership of John Macbride, the brigade was strengthened by volunteers travelling from Ireland via Delagoa Bay into South Africa.

==== Second Irish Brigade ====
The Second Irish Brigade was formed in January 1900 by former members of the Irish Transvaal Brigade. Former Le Journal correspondent Arthur Lynch was appointed as the unit's commander. The brigade consisted of 150 commandos from a variety of ethnic backgrounds. Including among others Irish, Australian, Greek, German, Boer and Italian members.

==== Polish volunteers ====
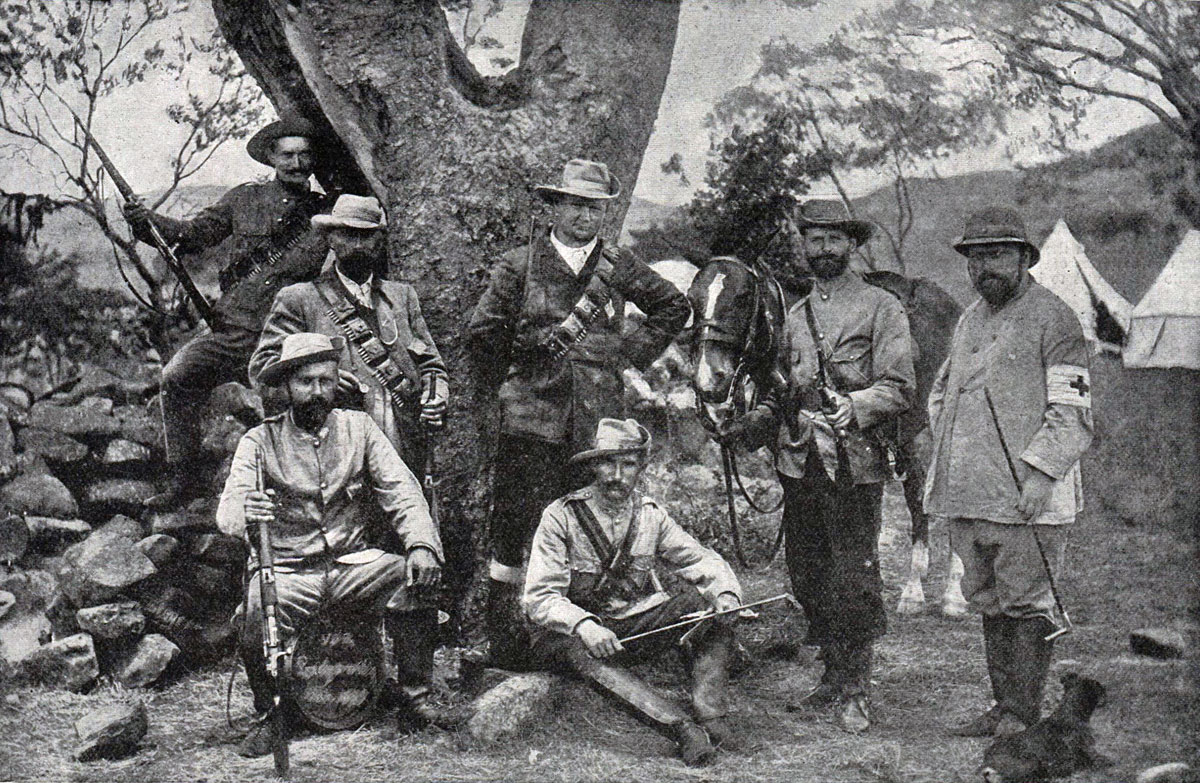
Robert Jutrzenka and Ludwik Zalewski (both seated) as soldiers of the German corps during the siege of Kimberley by the Boers in 1899

It is difficult to find out what was the number of Polish volunteers during the Second Boer War because Poles were treated in official censuses as Austrians, Germans and Russians. They were also limited by a considerable distance, and hence long and high travel costs. The Polish public sympathized with the situation of the Boers, and numerous Poles expressed a desire to aid their cause; in Poland, pro-Boer Poles collected donations to support Boers who were wounded in action and widows and orphans of those who were killed in action. Polish newspapers frequently published stories about Boer accomplishments in battles and stressed their peaceful attitudes, diligence and deep religiosity. All sectors of Polish society expressed hopes for a Boer victory, and carnival costumes of the uniforms of Boer generals proved immensely popular at carnivals. Numerous shop windows in Poland featured portraits of Boer leaders, with demand for these lithographs being so high that merchants who imported these portraits from the outbreak of the war supposedly gained immense profits from selling them. Because of the pro-Boer mood of the Polish public, one of the hotels in Warsaw, at 17 Zielna Street, was given the name "Pretoria".

Germany and Russia supported the Boers, supplying them with weapons, as well as sending military missions and medical assistance to the Boers republics. Among this crowd of people there were Poles. Many came individually to defend a nation that found itself in a similar position to Poland. One can also include to this, immigrants who came to South Africa just before the start of the war, while others appeared as part of projects organized by Germany and Russia. Polish names appear in the lists of German volunteers fighting in the unit they formed (deutsch-burischen Freikorps). Among about 800 known German volunteers, about 30 had Polish-sounding surnames. More is known about two of them. Robert Jutrzenka and Ludwik Zalewski arrived in the South African Republic a few years before the start of the Second Boer War and took an active part in the armed clash in 1895 during the Jameson Raid.

Other volunteers came as subjects of the Russian Tsar. Among them were two lieutenants, Leo Pokrowsky and Eugeniusz Augustus. Both were transferred to the reserve in December 1899, for the duration of their stay in South Africa; thus, neither was in South Africa as a soldier on duty. However, together with other Russian officers, they were in fact sent by their superiors to study the combat methods of the Boers and the British. Leo Pokrowsky remained in Africa, joining the guerrilla Bittereinder. His last reportage is dated April 1, 1900. Later he devoted himself to fighting for the Boers' cause, to the dissatisfaction of his superiors. He was so impressed by the Boers' courage that he made their cause his own. His comrades stated that "he had the goodness and progress of the Boers closer to the heart than [had] many Boers."

==== Russian volunteers ====
One of the countries where enthusiasm for the Boer cause was the greatest was Russia, where the war was extensively covered by the Russian media and numerous books, articles, plays, pamphlets and poems were published about the war, usually with a pronounced pro-Boer slant. One Russian writer complained: "Wherever you go these days you hear the same story – the Boers, the Boers and only the Boers". The national anthem of the Transvaal Transvaal, Transvaal, My Country was frequently played by Russian orchestras, numerous committees were founded to collect money for the Transvaal, and church services offered up prayers for a Boer victory. In countless newspaper serials and novels, the men of the kommandos were portrayed as heroes battling the "arrogant" British. Such was the popular enthusiasm that inns, restaurants, and cafés were given Afrikaans names and redecorated in the "Boer style" to improve business. The works of the novelist Olive Schreiner were frequently translated into Russian as her books become very popular after she condemned the British government. The novelist Leo Tolstoy wrote in his diary: "You know what point I’ve reached? Opening a paper every morning I passionately wish to read that the Boers have beaten the British...I should not rejoice at the victories of the Boers or grieve about their defeats, after all they kill the English soldiers too...I am glad when I read about the defeats of the British, it cheers my soul." The Emperor Nicholas II wrote to his sister: "I am wholly preoccupied with the war between England and the Transvaal. Every day I read the news in the British newspapers from the first to the last line...I cannot conceal my joy at...yesterday’s news that during General White’s sally two full British battalions and a mountain battery were captured by the Boers!" As Britain was Russia's principle antagonist in the 19th century, many Russians naturally sympathised with the Boers.

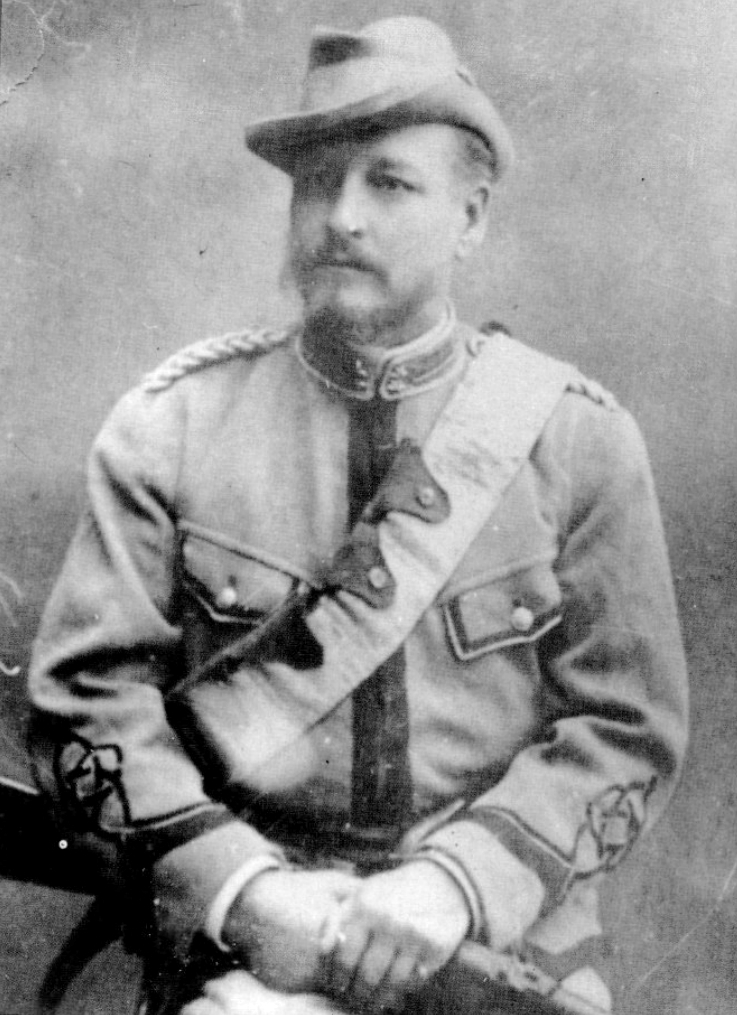
Yevgeny Maximov on his return from the Second Boer War dressed in the uniform of a Transvaal general

The British historian R.W. Johnson wrote: "Russian conservatives were pro-Boer not only for the usual nationalist, anti-British reasons but because they thought the Boers were like the best sort of Russians – conservative, rural, Christian folk resisting the invasion of their land by foreign (especially Jewish) capitalists." One conservative Moscow newspaper in an editorial stated: "The deep historical meaning of this war is that faith, patriotism . . . the patriarchal family, primordial tribal unity, iron discipline and the complete lack of so-called modern civilisation have . . . become such an invincible force that even the seemingly invincible British have begun to tremble." The Georgian Prince Niko Bagration was in Paris when the war began in October 1899 and despite never having heard of the Transvaal before, recalled thinking "but it felt very much like my motherland and I felt I must protect it." Prince Bagration was greeted in Pretoria by President Paul Kruger of the Transvaal. Yevgeny Maximov, a former officer in the Imperial Russian Army whose career had ended in disgrace after he attempted suicide, volunteered to fight for the Transvaal, in an attempt to extirpate his disgrace. Johnson called Maximov a tragic figure as his dishonorable discharge from the Russian Army owing to his suicide attempt marked him out as a man whose honor could never be redeemed, leading Maximov to volunteer in successive wars in attempts to prove his courage to the world and restore his lost honor. Maximov had previously fought with the Serbs against the Ottomans in 1876-78 and with the Ethiopians against the Italians in 1895–96. Maximov, an excellent horseman and marksman became renowned with the Boers due to his bravery under fire, and was thanked by Kruger in a telegram after the war for showing outstanding courage in combat. Kruger believed that Maximov was representing Nicholas and took him into his confidence, believing that Maximov had the power to make Russia intervene in the war. Some of the Russian volunteers were men of the left like Prince Mikhail Yengalychev, Ivan Zabolotny and Alexander Essen with the latter becoming a Bolshevik who ended his career as the deputy chairman of the Russian State Planning Committee in the 1920s. Left-wing Russians volunteered to join the Boer cause due to their anti-imperialist beliefs.

However, through several hundred Russians who did make their way to fight for the Transvaal, upon arriving they were often shocked by the corruption of the Transvaal government, its state of disorganization, and the casual brutality of the Afrikaners towards blacks. One Russian volunteer, Yevgeny Augustus, wrote that the Transvaal had become "a paradise for adventurers and rogues of all kinds" as thousands of men from all over the world, many of them disreputable, arrived in the Transvaal to fight in the war. The majority of the Russians who fought for the Transvaal were Russian Jews who come before the war to take advantage of the booming economic conditions caused by the Witwatersrand Gold Rush. The largest Jewish population in the Russian Empire was in the "Pale of Settlement" which consisted of what is now modern central and eastern Poland, Lithuania, Latvia, Belarus, western and central Ukraine and Moldova, so most of the "Russian" Jews in the Transvaal did not come from what is now modern Russia. Many of the Russian volunteers who arrived after the war started were antisemitic and refused to serve alongside the Jews already living in the Transvaal who volunteered to fight for their adopted country, leading to the two groups being segregated. Benzion Aaron, a Russian Jewish financier living in Johannesburg who was a friend of President Kruger founded the Jewish Ambulance Corps to take care of the wounded. Two Russian Jewish volunteers, Josef Segal and Wolf Jacobson were renowned for their skills as scouts.

==== Greek volunteers ====
Andre Wessels counts 14 Greeks who joined as foreign volunteers for the Boers. However, Evangelos Mantzaris notes that the number must've been higher. A 1902 photograph shows at least 27 Greeks on the Boers' side. Furthermore, a Greek veteran of the Anglo-Boer War (Captain Chrysovelonis) recounts at least 60 Greeks who partook in the war on the side of the Boers.

The most notable Greek in the war was John Costas, who fought in various battles, including Spion Kop and Paardeberg. He was taken prisoner after the Boers were defeated. During his captivity, Costas was taken to POW camps in British Ceylon. Like all the other volunteers, Costas joined the Boers out of his love for freedom. He was called “the hero of Modder River” because of his invaluable contribution to the Boer cause during that battle. South Africa honoured him for his services by erecting a statue of him in his native village of Lia, in Greece.

==== Australian volunteers ====
While the vast majority of people from Commonwealth nations fought with the British, a few Australians fought on the Boer side. The most famous of these was Colonel Arthur Lynch, formerly of Ballarat, who raised the Second Irish Brigade. Lynch, charged with treason was sentenced to death by the British government, for his service with the Boers. After mass petitioning and intervention by King Edward VII, he was released a year later and pardoned in 1907.

== Notable foreign volunteers ==
- Yevgeny Maximov
- Niko Bagration
- John Y. F. Blake
- Herman Coster
- Arthur Alfred Lynch
- John MacBride
- Camillo Ricchiardi
- Adolf Schiel
- George Henri Anne-Marie Victor de Villebois-Mareuil
- Ernest Douwes Dekker
- John Costas
