= Battle of Boshof =

1900 battle of the Second Boer War

- Part of Second Boer War
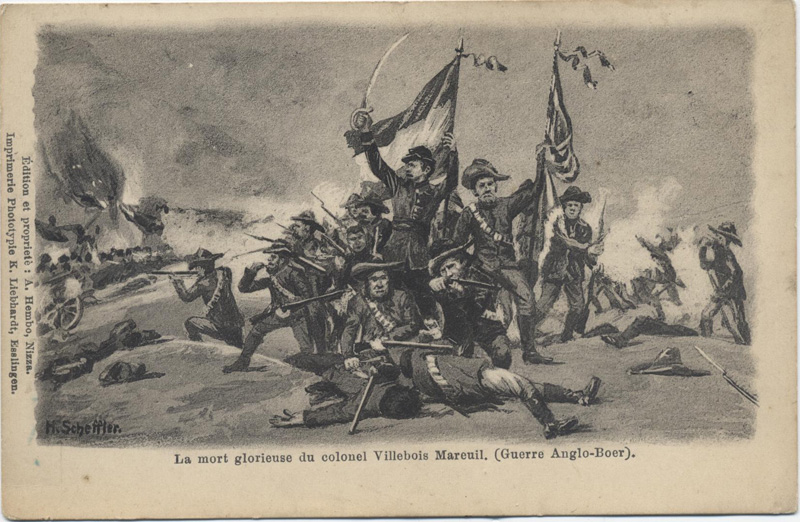
- French postcard depicting The glorious death of Comte de Villebois-Mareuil at the Battle of Boshof, 1900
Date	5 April 1900
Location	Boshof
Result	British victory

Belligerents
United Kingdom	South African Republic: Legion of France volunteers

Commanders and leaders
(United Kingdom) Lord Chesham	(South African Republic) George de Villebois-Mareuil †

Strength
750 men	120 men

Casualties and losses
3 killed, 10 wounded	11 killed 64 captured & wounded

The Battle of Boshof was fought during the Second Boer War on 5 April 1900 between British forces and mostly French volunteers of the Boer army.

== Events ==
=== Background ===
Following the Battle of Paardeberg (18–27 February), the relief of Kimberley and Ladysmith and the fall of Bloemfontein, General Frederick Roberts reorganised his force to pursue the defeated Boers. At the same time Lieutenant general Paul Methuen was tasked with clearing the country along the Vaal River on the Boers' flank and to drive towards Mafeking, which was still besieged.

On 5 April Methuen ordered Brigadier-General Lord Chesham, with the Kimberley Mounted Corps and 4th Battery RFA. From an informer they found intelligence on a Boer Commando unit led by a French volunteer, George de Villebois-Mareuil. Methuen was given information that the Boer unit intended to attack the British at Boshof near Tweefontein. The newly formed Imperial Yeomanry 3rd and 10th battalions, was given the task to surround the Boers. De Villebois-Mareuil, was in charge of the French legion volunteers which had 75 foreign volunteers most of whom were of the French but included a number of German, Dutch, Americans and one Russian Prince.

=== Battle ===
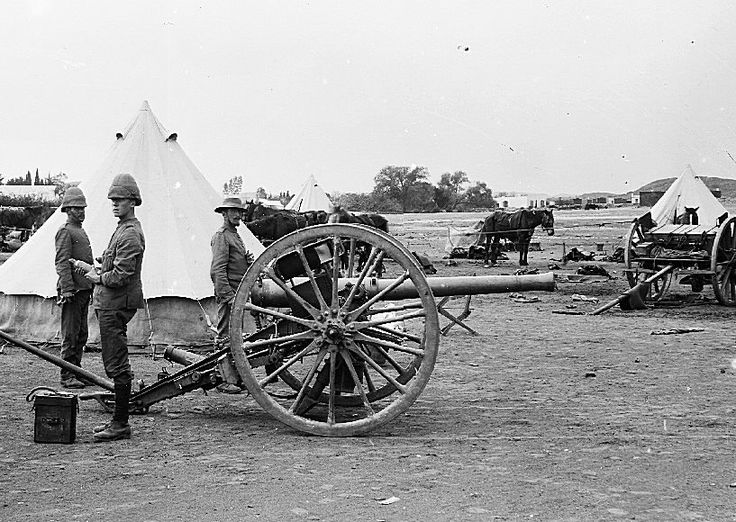
A British 15 pounder field gun at a camp near Boshof, 1900

De Villebois-Mareuil's force lay on two small hills (or Kopjes) - the foreign volunteers on one and the Boers on the other. By 3pm the British force were setting up positions around the hills. A bombardment by four 15 pounder guns then commenced, along with suppressing fire by a Maxim machine gun.

As the yeomanry prepared to close with the bayonet, the Boers on the hill saw that they were being outflanked and asked De Villebois-Mareuil to withdraw but he flatly refused. He was hoping for a thunderstorm which was coming their way to aid him. The pounding increased the casualties and the Boers saw the hopelessness of the situation - they mounted their horses and fought their way out. De Villebois-Mareuil and the French were left to attempt to make a gallant but futile last stand. The Kimberley Mounted Corps crept up on the right and the rest of the Yeomen dismounted and did the same on the left. Both sides were close and the British artillery had to be careful when firing in order not to hit their own men. Some of the French tried to escape by mounting horses but were all taken down easily in a hail of rifle fire. Still the rest refused to surrender. Nevertheless, the Yeomanry took advantage and moved through the bushes and boulders around the hills. They slowly crept up ever closer, and casualties were light. Within a few hours of fighting De Villebois-Mareuil was killed by a shell and morale sank amongst the volunteers. Seeing the panic the Yeomanry now only within fifteen yards of the fortified positions fixed bayonets and charged.

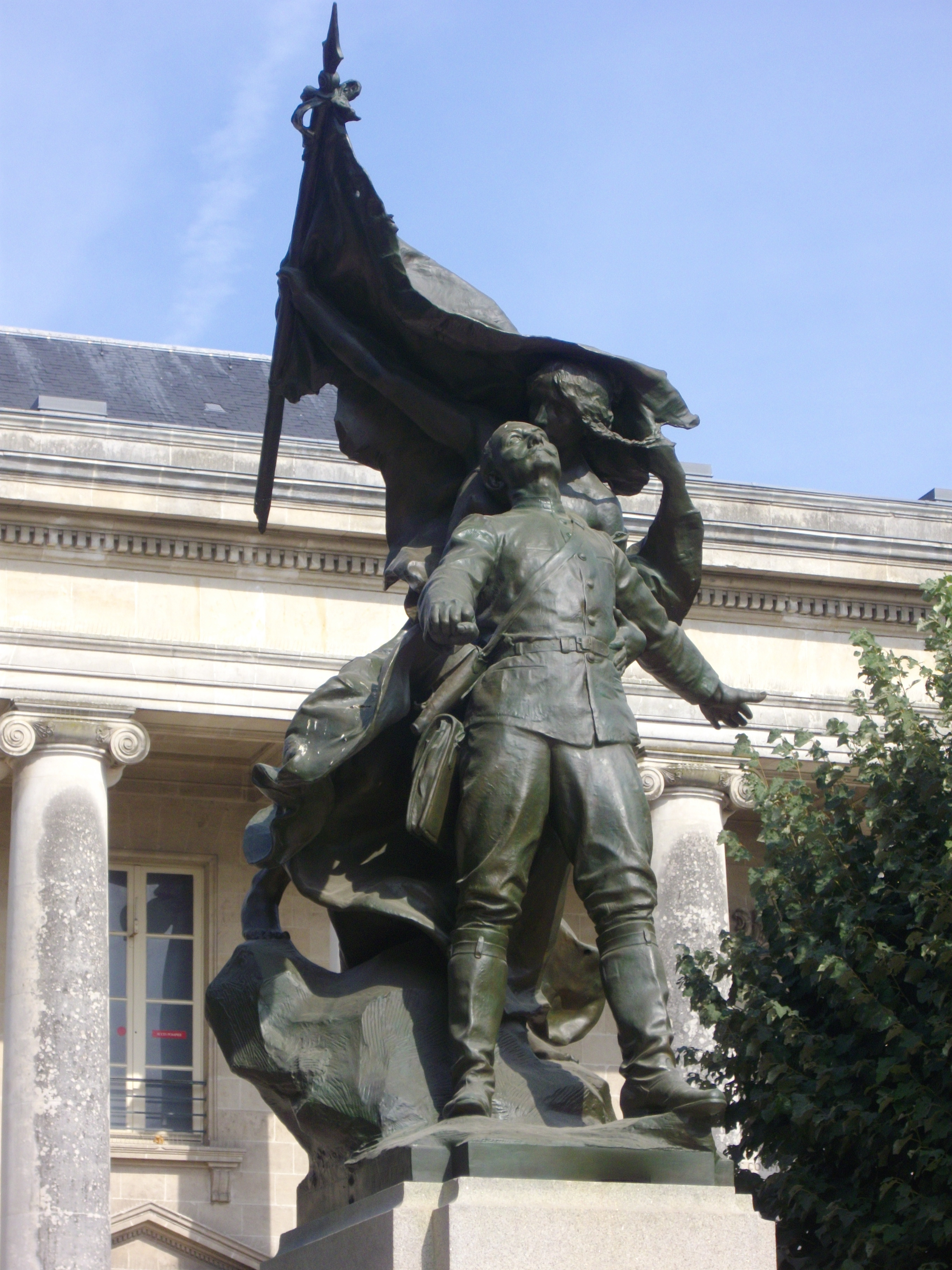
Statue du colonel de Villebois-Mareuil in Nantes

By 6pm with darkness having approached the volunteers waved a white flag and the surviving volunteers surrendered. The thunderstorm that could have covered their retreat then came across the battlefield. The battle lasted only three hours - in all eleven of the volunteers were killed, the rest were wounded and captured. De Villebois-Mareuil's Aide-de-camp Comte Pierre de Breda was captured and was treated with chivalry by Methuen. In addition Prince Bagration of Tiflis, a Russian volunteer was captured. British losses were three killed and ten wounded.

=== Aftermath ===
One week after his death the Boer Foreign Legion was disbanded and placed under General De la Rey to continue with the guerrilla phase of the war.

The battle was the first time that the Imperial Horse Yeomanry had fought and was also their first victory.

British troops buried De Villebois-Mareuil with full military honours. A mass was arranged by the Ligue de la patrie française which was held in his honour at the Notre Dame de Paris which 10,000 people attended. De Villebois-Mareuil's horse was taken to Britain by Lord Chesham, where it lived until February 1911.

A monument was later erected on the Farm Middelkuil, ten kilometres East of Boshof, where the battle took place, to commemorate battle.
