= Nicholas Bagration of Mukhrani =

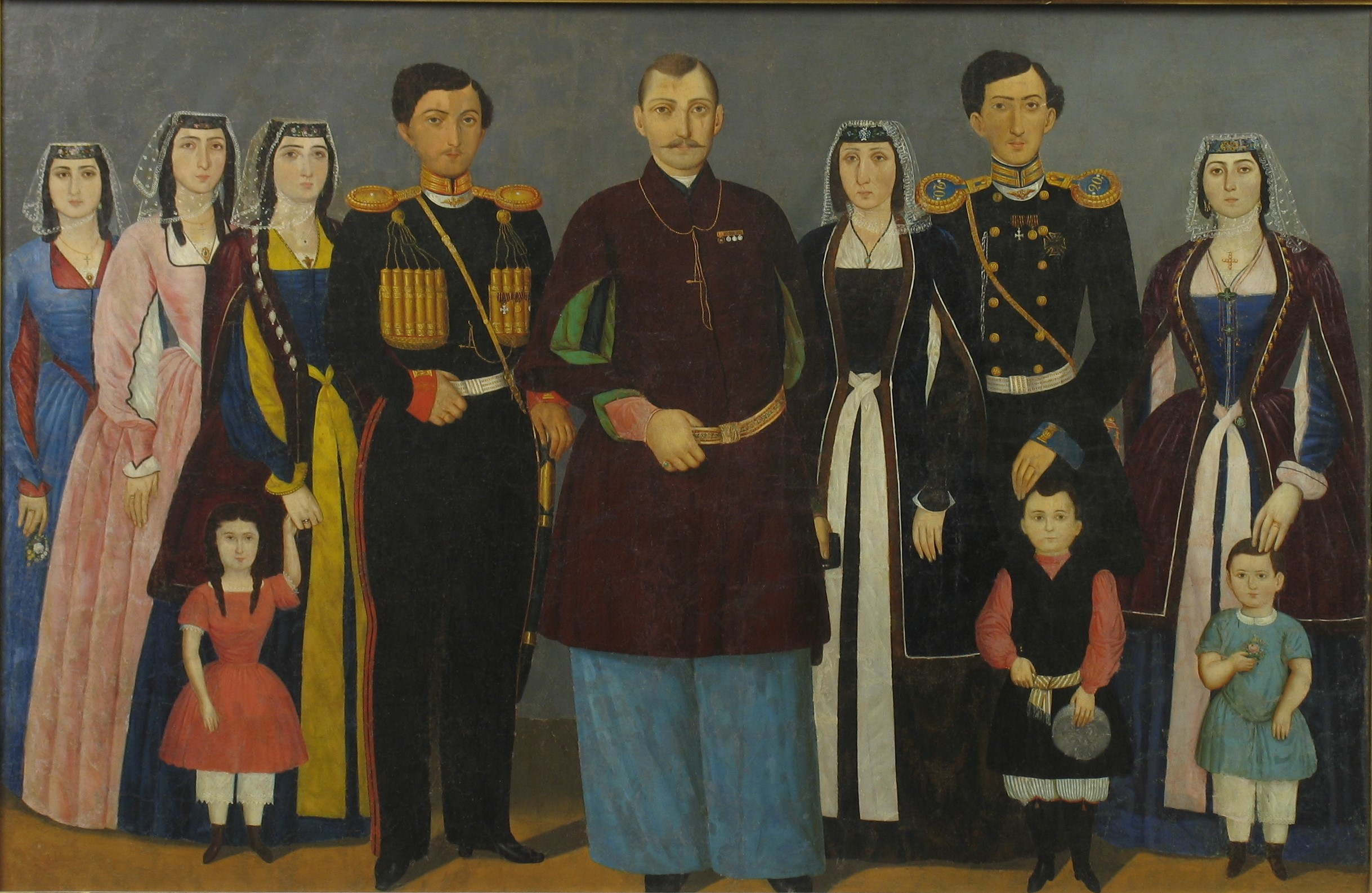
Prince Nicholas with his family.

Prince Nicholas Bagration of Mukhrani (Georgian: ნიკოლოზ ბაგრატიონ მუხრანელი) (1807–1864) was a Georgian nobleman of the House of Mukhrani.

Prince Nicholas was son of Prince Edisher Bagration of Mukhrani (born 1787) descended from Prince Constantine I of Mukhrani.

On 11 November 1823 Prince Nicholas married Princess Tamar Jorjadze (1813–1878) and had 12 children:

- Salome Bagration of Mukhrani (1825–1869)
- Nina Bagration of Mukhrani (1830–1843)
- Mariam Bagration of Mukhrani (born 1832)
- Irakli Bagration of Mukhrani (1833–1857)
- George Nikolaevich Bagration (1834–1882)
  - Niko Bagrationi "the Boer"
- Martha Bagration of Mukhrani (1836–1892)
- Alexander Bagration of Mukhrani (1838–1841)
- Ana Bagration of Mukhrani (1839–1913)
- Makrina Bagration of Mukhrani (1842–1919)
- Elene Bagration of Mukhrani (born 1844)
- Elisabed Bagration of Mukhrani (born 1844)
- Elizbar Bagration of Mukhrani (1861–1888)

Prince Nicholas died on 10 May 1864.
