= Italy–South Africa relations =

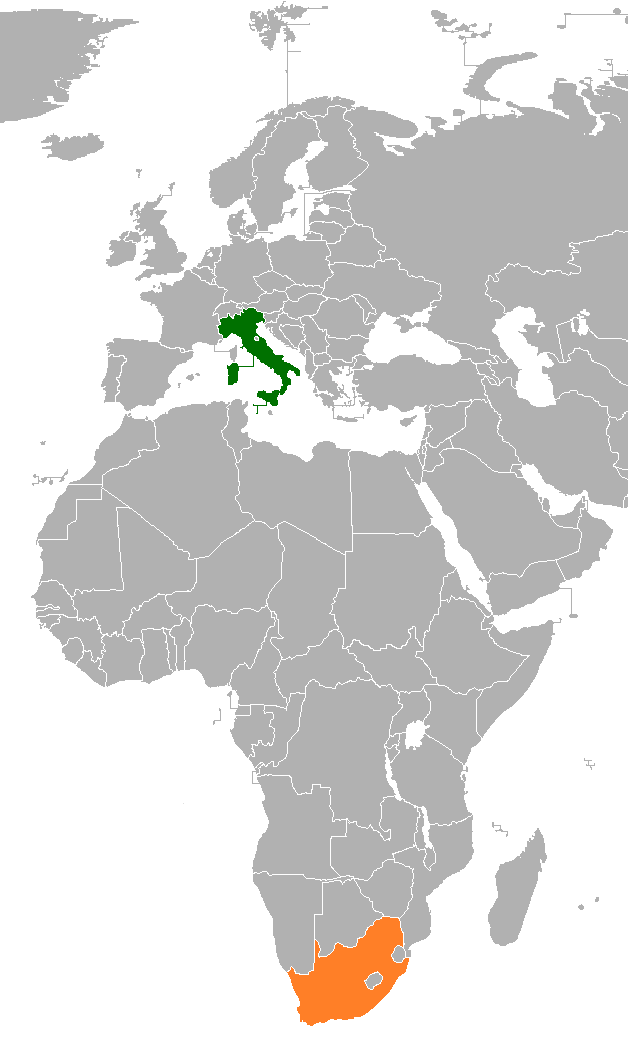
- Italy: South Africa

Italy–South Africa relations are the bilateral relations between the Italian Republic and the Republic of South Africa. Both countries established diplomatic relations in 1929. Italy has an embassy in Pretoria, a consulate-general in Johannesburg and a consulate in Cape Town. South Africa has an embassy in Rome. Both countries are members of the G20.

== History ==
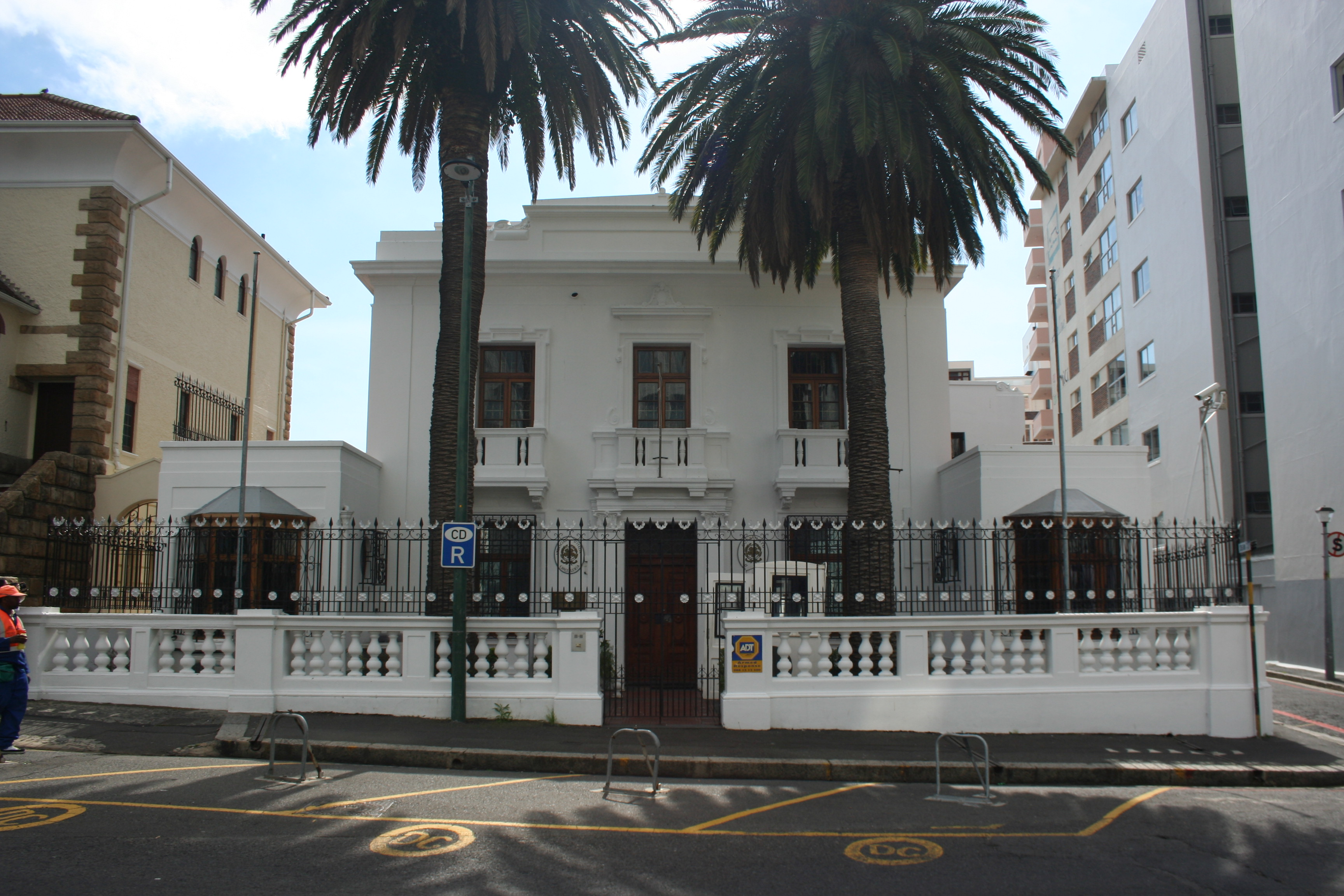
Consulate of Italy in Cape Town

Relations between Italy and South Africa begin with the mineral revolution in 1870. In this period the history of Italy-South African relations is intertwined with English history and the first diamond mining discoveries. The South African War between English and Boer Republics (1899–1902) ended up conditioning and limiting Italian emigration.

In 1890, the Italian Society of Mutual Aid and Charity was established in Cape Town, made up of 47 members. It was the first community initiative of Italians in South Africa and its activity continued without interruption until 1947. An Italian volunteer militia in support of the Boers' cause was formed by the Piedmontese Camilo Ricchiardi in the same period.

From 1901 to 1915 and from 1916 to 1942, Italian migration to South Africa noted a significant increase. South Africa was the destination for the relocation of a large number of Italians. 94,000 prisoners of war captured in Italian East Africa and North Africa were placed in the Zonderwater Prisoner of War camp from 1941 to 1947. The tendency to employ Italian prisoners of war in the works at the camp, which started in 1941 during the Second World War, increased considerably after the fall of the fascist regime in 1943.

In 1948, Italian migration to South Africa increased further. In the 1970s, there were 40,000 Italians in South Africa. The situation changed with the elections of 1994 which determined the expulsion of the National Party from power. Starting from this date, South Africa and Italy have signed a number of important bilateral agreements in the fields of trade, technology, culture and defence. The first of these was the Convention to avoid double taxation in the field of income taxes and to prevent tax evasion, with an additional Protocol, signed in Rome on 16 November 1995.

In 2003, a Memorandum of Understanding on Bilateral Consultation (MoU) was signed which established regular meetings at Senior Official level. The same MoU regulates a general framework for bilateral consultation.

In 2013, President Jacob Zuma conferred the high honour of Order of Friends of Oliver Reginald Tambo to two citizens of Reggio Emilia because of their support in the fight against apartheid. The award helped to strengthen the bond between South Africa and Italy, where Oliver Tambo spent part of his exile.

In June 2019, President Matamela Cyril Ramaphosa and Italian Prime Minister Giuseppe Conte met for the first time in Osaka (Japan) for the G20 .Then in August 2019 the two met a second time in Biarritz (France) for the margin of the G7 Summit. The purpose of the meetings was to discuss issues of common concern such as cooperation, peace and security in Africa and the expansion of economic relations between the two countries.

== Economic relations ==
Economic relations between South Africa and Italy are facilitated by a system of governmental institutions. These involve the Economic and Commercial Office of the Embassy of Italy in Pretoria and the Italian South African Chamber of Trade and Industries. The latter conducts feasibility market studies offering trade assistance and market-orientation services to both Italian and South African enterprises. Moreover, South Africa and Italy are members of the so-called EPA-SADC Agreement, an economic agreement between the European Union (EU) and the Southern African Development Community (SADC) which promotes trade liberalisation among member states encouraging the removal and reduction of customs duties.

Due to its dynamic economy, South Africa is the first trading partner of Italy in Sub-Saharan Africa. The number of Italian exports to South Africa, consisting mainly of machine tools, has increased considerably in the last few years. In 2018, Italian exports registered an increase of about +8.5%. In the same year, the total value of Italian imports rose by +13.4%. Coal, gold, steel and iron are the main goods imported by Italy. However, it is possible to notice an economic slowdown looking at 2019 and 2020s Italian trade exchanges toward South Africa.

The following table shows the latest official data according to the Osservatorio Economico del Ministero degli Affari Esteri e della Cooperazione Internazionale:

Italian trade exchanges to and from South Africa
Italy's export to South Africa	2018	2019	2020	Italy's import from South Africa	2018	2019	2020
Total (million of euros)	2.007,02	1.860,62	1.512,48	Total (million of euros)	1.446,76	1.480,86	1.308,59
Growth rate (%)	+8.5	−7.3	−18.7	Growth rate (%)	+13.4	+2.4	−11.6
Source: Agenzia per la promozione all'estero e l'internazionalizzazione delle imprese italiane (ICE) based on ISTAT.

According to the Report of the Italian South African Chamber of Trade and Industries of 2020, these figures will tend to get worse because of the COVID-19 pandemic which has had dramatic effects on the economic system of the two countries.

Regarding investment flows, they expanded remarkably from 1997 when there was an increase over 426% of Foreign Direct Investment (FDI) from Italy to South Africa. In 2001, the investment amounted to EUR 11.8 million and Italy became amongst the 10th biggest investment partner for South Africa. Currently, there are a lot of Italian companies which own South African enterprises’ parcels (the so-called brownfield FDI) or have built their industries in South African soil (greenfield FDI). According to Eurostat, the Italian investment flows toward South Africa amounted to EUR 205,2 million in 2017 and EUR 85.7 million in 2018.

== Cultural cooperation ==
In 1998 the Italian Cultural Institute was founded in Pretoria, where various activities and initiatives are organised. The main activities consist of Italian language courses with final exams to obtain language certifications, the assignment of scholarships, photographic exhibitions, events of dance, theatre and music.

At the moment, there are two agreements concerning cultural cooperation between Italy and South Africa:

- The Agreement for Cooperation in the fields of arts, culture, education and sport, signed by two countries in 2002.
- The Film co-production Agreement, signed by two countries in 2003.

Since 1998, several collaboration agreements have been signed between some Universities in South Africa and others in Italy, covering multiple study courses.

Over the years, the Italian Embassy began to organise sports competitions and the money raised from those was donated to people of two Provinces in South Africa, where people lived in disadvantaged social and economic conditions. In 2013 there was a sailing race and this initiative was repeated also the following year. In November 2014 many football matches were organised, involving more than 200 school children located in precarious areas. In 2015, the Italian Embassy helped more than 30 children from a primary school in Mafikeng to communicate with Samantha Cristoforetti, an Italian astronaut. The initiative involved also a class of an Italian school in Caprino Bergamasco. At the end of the meeting with the astronaut, the two classes had the opportunity to get to know each other virtually.

In 2014, the first bilingual educational institution was opened in Johannesburg. Courses in Italian are held in three Universities in South Africa. In 2019, the Global Steering Group for Impact Investment, which Italy is also part of, promoted the Education Outcome Fund in a new investment project of one billion Euros in the field of education in Africa and the Middle East. South Africa is also one of the objectives of this investment and, specifically, they want to optimise the ability of students in reading and mathematics in public schools.

== Development cooperation ==
The cooperation between Italy and South Africa is regulated by the Memorandum of understanding of 1996. Alongside their agreement, these two countries have been involved in promoting several activities related to the development of education and health, as well as environmental issues.

As regards education development, within the agreement signed on 13 March 2002, in Cape Town, the exchange of academic materials, teachers and researchers was established, as well as the introduction of scholarships.

Regarding health, the most significant initiative, guided by the Italian Centro Nazionale AIDS (CNAIDS) and the South African National Department of Health, concerned the fight against HIV/AIDS. The Ministero degli Affari Esteri e della Cooperazione Internazionale (MAECI) allocated 20 million euros to support the research program led by the South African National Department of Health for the enhancement and development of HIV/AIDS treatment. The activity was focused on:

- the creation of a “Good Manufacturing Practice” structure which managed the production of Vaccines in South Africa;
- the testing of the vaccine against HIV/AIDS;
- the enhancement of clinical research on the disease in three provinces of the South African public system.

At the end of the program, launched in 2008, the "Tat Vaccine Partnership" initiative was established with the aim of raising funds for the completion of the vaccine trial.

Among the various environmental initiatives, it is important to highlight the agreement signed on 18 October 2016, in Johannesburg, between the Italian Ministero dell’Ambiente e della Tutela del Territorio e del Mare and the Department of Water and Sanitation of South Africa.

== Resident diplomatic missions ==
- Italy has an embassy in Pretoria, a consulate-general in Johannesburg and a consulate in Cape Town.
- South Africa has an embassy in Rome.

== See also ==
- Foreign relations of Italy
- Foreign relations of South Africa
- Italian South Africans
