= Gerald Louis Burke =

Canadian orthopaedic surgeon (1906–1968)

- Born: Gerald Louis Bourke; 29 December 1906; Boshof, Free State, South Africa
- Died: 30 March 1968
- Education: University of Alberta
- Occupations: medical researcher; surgeon; author
- Years active: 35+
- Known for: Orthopaedic surgery research
- Spouses: Constance Jacqueline Wilson (1919-1945); Margaret Elsie Perkins (1921-1998)

Internal surgical fixation using tantalum plates and screws
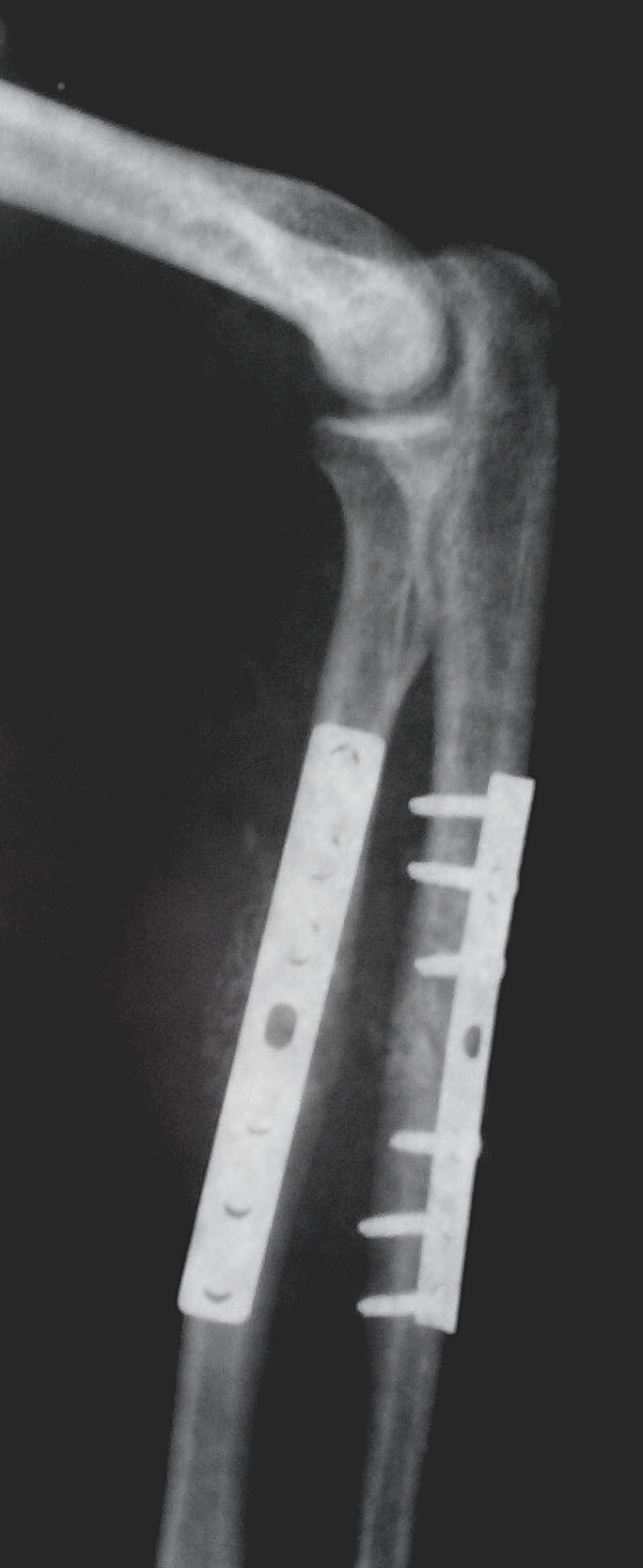
- The use of Tantalum plates and screws to repair fractures, note the visible break in the right forearm. The tantalum screws form a permanent and stable bond with the bone tissue.

Gerald Louis Burke (29 December 1906 – 30 March 1968) was an orthopaedic surgeon, medical researcher and academic. He is widely recognized as the discoverer of the suitability of the metal Tantalum for implanting in human tissue. His was the first known use of tantalum metal plates and fasteners for the stable surgical repair of complex bone fractures and implants. His discovery and development of tantalum implant technology truly revolutionized the present practice of orthopaedic surgery and modern dentistry.

Gerald Burke was born in Boshof, Free State, South Africa, to a family with a tradition of military medical service. His father, James Bourke, was a surgeon in the British Army during the Boer War. The most difficult medical challenge in those times was the rapid amputation of limbs during combat. There was no other way to save the lives of young soldiers who had been hit by cannon-fire. Young Gerald grew up in a family obsessed with finding an alternative to amputation.

After life returned to somewhat normal after the Boer war, young "Ged's" family moved to Leicester, England, where he completed his basic schooling at Rugby, near Coventry. Burke then moved to Canada as a youth to attend medical school at the University of Alberta where he graduated with a Medicini Doctoris (MD) in 1933. Burke then received the opportunity to complete a specialty in Orthopedic Surgery at the Los Angeles Orthopedic Hospital (now part of part of the larger UCLA Santa Monica Medical Center).

== Repairing Broken limbs ==
This is where Burke became intensely involved with medical research at a very advanced level, and where, like his father, advanced his concern over the numbers of amputations that resulted from simple broken arms and legs as a result of military, industrial, and automobile accidents.

== The Problem of Corrosion and Infection ==
At that time, practitioners knew that bone would heal itself if it could be immobilized with some kind of external fasteners. Surgeons dreamed of the ideal fastener that could save broken limbs. But all known metals resulted in infection and deformed unions. External splints had some success, but often failed within a few weeks - and then came the inevitable amputation.

== The use of metals in orthopaedic surgery ==
In his early research at the Los Angeles Orthopaedic Hospital and the Department of Physical Chemistry at the California Institute of Technology, Burke assembled a team of specialists focused on the use of metals in surgery, and his team's pioneering research was published in 1940. In "The Corrosion of Metals in Tissues", Burke and his team at Caltech, together with John Norton Wilson, PhD, Dr.David Stevenson, and Emil Burcik (all of the Dept of Physical Chemistry) were the first to make a detailed analysis of the various metals attempted in surgical repairs. The ideal in trauma surgery was to be able to fix broken bones with metal plates and screws. In personal correspondence at the time, Burke remarked that "It should be like fixing wooden furniture." However, the problem facing surgeons was that almost all metals in surgery result in horrendous corrosion and infection issues.

== Prior Investigation ==
Burke and his team were following on from the earlier analysis of Walter G. Stuck which documented the perils of the electrolytic destruction of tissues resulting from metallic implants. In addition to fracture repair, Burke's team was also focused on related surgical specializations such as polio reconstruction, dental and cosmetic repair, and repair of skull fractures and, of course, the repair of common limb fractures (thereby avoiding amputation with its concomitant challenging consequences). Some obvious metals - gold, for example - were inert enough to be implanted, but were much too soft to be of any use, since the joint rarely lasted more than a few weeks before failing. Silver caused severe infections. Stainless steel was strong enough but corroded rapidly because of reactions with surrounding fluids, and quickly became the source of infection. The testing of metal implants proved to be extremely difficult and stressful for everyone concerned because of the harsh consequences of lab testing. After several years of painstaking analysis and testing, Burke focused on the relatively rare element Tantalum. Tantalum was as strong as steel, inert, and yet possessed a surface molecular characteristic that bonded quickly with bone tissue. In journal publications of the time, Burke described the team's first successful use of tantalum in femoral and thigh (intertrochanteric) fractures, for complete joint replacement, for clean non-scarring sutures, and for repair of trauma damage such as skull fractures resulting from industrial or military injuries, and, eventually, for dental and jaw surgery prior to developing cosmetic fittings for dental implants.

== Refining and Fabricating Challenges ==
Burke's team was the first anywhere to conduct the necessary chemical/metallurgical analysis of scarce and expensive metals like tantalum and titanium for the feasibility of engineering implants in living tissue. Burke's pioneering discoveries have been cited in over 200 primary journal articles since he published the results of his team's work in 1940. Burke and his team subsequently developed the manufacturing processes, leading to the now widely accepted use of tantalum in orthopaedic surgery and dentistry. Burke showed that both metals were strong enough and sufficiently stable for human implants in spite of the early difficulty in mining, refining and fabrication of such difficult metals. Over time, as Burke's research showed, tantalum has proved to be the better choice because of its superior ability to permanently and cleanly bond with living tissue.

== Later life ==
Burke's parents were suddenly and unexpectedly killed in the German bombing raids in the city of Leicester, England, in November 1940. America was not yet in the war, and Burke moved to Vancouver to join the staff at St.Paul's Hospital. War-time rehabilitation of injured servicemen became a priority. Gerald Burke died in 1968 leaving 3 children and ten grand-children. His textbooks and research papers eventually migrated onto the internet and can be found quite easily there.
