= John Costas =

John Costas may refer to:

- John Costas (Greek revolutionary) (1868–1932), Greek revolutionary and volunteer during Second Boer War.
- John P. Costas (engineer) (1923–2008), American engineer, invented the Costas loop and Costas arrays
- John P. Costas (business) (born 1957), American businessman, former head of UBS Investment Bank and Dillon Read Capital Management
