= George Bagration =

George Bagration may refer to:

- George Bagration of Mukhrani (1884–1957), Georgian nobleman
- Jorge Bagration of Mukhrani (1944–2008), Spanish racing car driver of Georgian descent
- George Nikolaevich Bagration (1834–1882), Georgian nobleman
