= Yevgeny Maximov =

Russian adventurer, soldier and journalist (1849–1904)

Yevgeny Yakovlevich Maximov
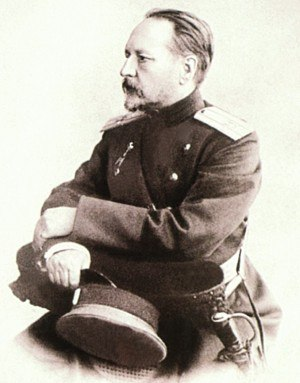
- Born: March 4, 1849; Tsarskoye Selo, Russia
- Died: October 14, 1904 (aged 55); South of Mukden, China
- Spouse: Maria Nikolaievna
- Children: Alexander Yevgenyevich Maximov
- Military career
- Allegiance: Russian Empire 1869–1875, 1877–1878 1880, 1904; Principality of Serbia 1875–1877; Ethiopian Empire 1895–1896; Kingdom of Greece 1897; South African Republic 1899–1900
- Cavalry: Imperial Russian Army, Serbian Army, Ethiopian militia, Greek Army, South African Republic Commando.
- Service years: 1869–1875, 1876–1878, 1880, 1895–1896, 1897, 1899–1900, 1904.
- Rank: General
- Conflicts: Serbian-Ottoman Wars; Russo-Turkish War; Russian conquest of Central Asia; First Italo-Ethiopian War; Greco-Turkish War; Second Boer War; Russo-Japanese War †

Yevgeny Yakovlevich Maximov (Russian: Евге́ний Я́ковлевич Макси́мов; 4 March 1849 – 14 October 1904) was a Russian Empire adventurer, soldier and journalist mostly remembered for his service with the South African Republic during the Second Anglo-Boer War.

== Early life ==
Maximov was born in Tsarskoye Selo, an upper class suburb of St. Petersburg, the son of a Russian naval officer father and a Swedish mother. During his youth, he studied at the Institute of Technology and the law faculty of St. Petersburg University. In 1869, Maximov joined the Imperial Russian Army as an officer in His Majesty's Cuirassier Life Guard Regiment after passing the officer's exam. The boring and routine-bound life of an officer in peace-time proved to be difficult for Maximov who had a hyper-active personality which led him to crave action.

In 1875, Maximov attempted to commit suicide, which led to him being dishonourably discharged from the Army. The suicide attempt and the dishonourable discharge created a black mark on Maximov's career, which he spent the rest of his life trying to erase. The British historian R. W. Johnson called Maximov a tragic figure as his dishonourable discharge from the Russian Army owing to his suicide attempt marked him out as a man whose honour could never be redeemed, leading Maximov to volunteer in successive wars in attempts to prove his courage to the world and restore his lost honour.

== Adventurer, 1875–1899 ==
In 1875, Maximov volunteered to fight with the Serbs against the Ottoman Empire, showing much bravery under fire. Maximov crossed over to the Ottoman province of Bosnia-Herzegovina to take command of a Bosnian Serb Chetnik (guerrilla) band. Though not trained as a guerrilla leader, Maximov had much success leading his Chetniks against the Ottoman forces in Bosnia. During the Russian-Ottoman war of 1877-1878, Maximov was allowed to rejoin the Russian Army as an enlisted man and served in the Russian Army as it advanced into the Balkans, reaching the gates of Constantinople before the Ottomans sued for peace, with the war being ended by the Treaty of San Stefano. In between his bouts as a volunteer, Maximov worked as a newspaper correspondent for St. Petersburg newspapers, mostly in Central Asia, the Caucasus, the Balkans, and the Middle East, always covering wars.

In 1880, Maximov served with a Flying Medical Company offering medical aid to wounded men during the Russian conquest of Turkmenistan. During this time, Maximov met Mikhail Skobelev, the famous "White General" who led the conquest of Central Asia, who always remained Maximov's role model. Despite his ostensible medical duties, in practice Maximov led an "advance flying squad" of cavalry that fought against the Turkmen as Skobelev led his army deeper and deeper into Central Asia. In 1881 after the assassination of the Emperor Alexander II by Narodnik terrorists, the monarchist Maximov joined the Corps of Gendarmes in order to fight against anarchists as like many other Russian conservatives, Maximov was outraged over the assassination of Alexander II. Maximov served in the Caucasus as a gendarme until his resignation in 1884.

In 1895–96, during the First Italo-Ethiopian War, Maximov served as a volunteer with the Ethiopians against the Italians. He arrived in Ethiopia as a Red Cross volunteer, but his unwillingness to see a fellow Orthodox nation being conquered led Maximov to join one of the feudal hosts raised by the Ethiopian nobility in response to the call from the Emperor Menelik II to resist the Italians (Ethiopia had no standing army in 1895). Maximov had planned to stay in Ethiopia and to mount an expedition to better map out the source of the Blue Nile, but the news that war was brewing between Greece and the Ottoman Empire led him to depart Ethiopia. In the Greco-Turkish War of 1897, Maximov served as a volunteer with the Greeks against the Ottomans. After Greece was defeated, Maximov worked as a journalist in Afghanistan and Iran. Maximov described himself as fascinated with "civilised warfare which attracts men of certain description, and to them a well fought battle is the highest form of exciting amusement".

== Boer War ==
In 1899, Maximov went to South Africa as the correspondent of the newspapers Novoie Vremia, Sankt-Peterburgskiie Vedomosti and Rossiia to cover the Boer War. Despite the way his career had ended in disgrace, Maximov was probably sent to South Africa to observe the war for the Russian general staff as he met several officers of the General Staff in St. Petersburg before leaving. The British tried to prevent Maximov from going to South Africa, forcing him to get off his ship in Alexandria, Egypt, saying his presence was not desired in South Africa. Undeterred, Maximov traveled via train from Alexandria to Port Said. Maximov was able to board a ship in Port Said that took him to Djibouti, Zanzibar, Madagascar and finally to Lourenço Marques (modern Maputo, Mozambique). From Portuguese East Africa, Maximov was able to make his way to the Transvaal. Upon arriving, Maximov immediately joined the Transvaal forces, and only filed one newspaper dispatch for the Novoie Vremia about the Boer War, which was published in 1902, two years after he left South Africa.

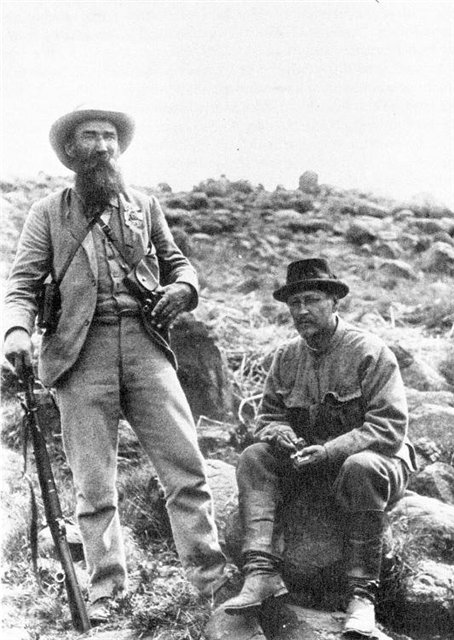
Lt. Col. Maximov (right) in South Africa with General Willem Johannes Kolbe

A conservative nationalist and monarchist, Maximov disliked those Russian volunteers on the left such as Prince Mikhail Yengalychev (later exiled to Siberia for his role in the Revolution of 1905) and Alexander Essen (who later became deputy chairman of the Soviet State Planning Commission in the 1920s). A Belgian woman who served as a nurse with the Transvaal volunteers, Alice Bron, described Maximov: "The colonel, in fact, is a man of action, and his manners savour somewhat of the camp. He is a believer in the poetry of war, and says he likes nothing better than to hear the whistling of bullets and the thunder of cannon; and, in fact, when he indulges in recollections of his service with Skobelev, the handsome 'white cuirassier', his face lights up, and he becomes a poet inspired by the noise of war." Bron also described him: "He is as bold as a lion, though he's as obstinate as a mule."

In March 1900, Maximov become the deputy commander of the European Legion which was commanded by the Frenchman George Henri Anne-Marie Victor de Villebois-Mareuil. On 4 March 1900, Maximov met with President Martinus Theunis Steyn of the Orange Free State and on 13 March 1900 met with President Paul Kruger of the Transvaal Republic. The Russian journalist Yevgeny Augustus who was covering the war wrote about Maximov:

"By ways known only to him he earned the confidence of the Transvaal authorities, began to visit President Kruger without ceremony, became quite at home with old Reitz, entered into relations with Steyn...To us ordinary mortals who never even dreamed of the honour to have tea with Kruger or Reitz, his activities seemed highly mysterious."

Maximov admired President Steyn, saying he was "the noblest, finest and most disinterested figure" in the entire war and the "incarnation of bravery, self-sacrifice, and stainless honesty...he is a savant, his heart is in the right place, and he is as brave as a lion"

An excellent marksman and horseman, Maximov's skills with guns and horses always impressed the Boers who saw good horsemanship and marksmanship as admirable talents in a man. The Boers generally disliked the foreign volunteers who came to fight with them against the British, and only accepted as equals those who showed exceptional skills and bravery together with an willingness to embrace aspects of Afrikaner culture. Maximov ability to shoot springboks from a moving train at the distance of 800 meters without ever missing as he did several times on a train ride from Pretoria to Bloemfontein was considered to be phenomenal. As several other burghers (Afrikaans for citizens) had also tried during the same train ride to shoot springboks out on the veld and missed, Maximov's marksmanship won him the respect of the Boers. Maximov was one of the few foreign volunteers who were ever truly embraced by the Boers. Maximov's ability to tame and ride horses considered untamable also won him admiration from the Boers, most of whom lived out on the veld and whose culture was deeply centered around horses. Maximov wore a Boer style uniform with a slough hat and a bandolier with the rest of his uniform left to himself to design as was normal with the Boers. Deeply fascinated with South Africa, Maximov took numerous photographs of the South African countryside, cities, and towns together with photographs of Boer commanders and the Zulu people, whom he was interested in, and which were later found to be in the possession of his son Alexander, a retired mining engineer living in Leningrad in the 1970s.

After Villebois-Mareuil was killed, Maximov was considered to be the commander of the European Legion, but his reputation as a harsh disciplinarian ensured that he was instead made the commander of the Hollander Corps. A major problem for the Boers with the foreign volunteers was that the Transvaal had only a tiny professional army consisting entirely of "gunners" (artillerymen), which was a specialised skill that the average Boer farmer lacked while the Orange Free State had no professional army at all. The professional military of the Transvaal consisted of the Staatsartillerie who in 1899 numbered 314 men. In both Boer republics, the military was the kommando militia system under which all able-bodied Boer men were called up from their farms in times of emergency to serve in kommandos with officers elected by themselves. As such, neither Boer republic had the ability to properly train the foreign volunteers lacking to a lack of instructors and as such, Maximov's services as a former Imperial Russian officer in training the volunteers were greatly appreciated by the Boer leaders. Kruger had hopes that the Volunteer Corps would serve as a nucleus for a professional army to be created after the war as the prolonged war with Britain exposed problems with the kommando system. Boer culture was very democratic and almost all burghers were unwilling to give up their right to elect their officers, making the Volunteer Corps ideal as a prototype for a professional army for the South African Republic. The foreign volunteers numbered about 2,700 men with the largest contingent being the Dutch (about 650), followed by the Germans (about 550), the French (about 400), the Americans (about 300), the Russians (about 250), the Italians (about 200), the Irish (also about 200) with the rest coming from various parts of the world.

Maximov had a low opinion of most of the volunteers who had come to fight for the Transvaal, charging that the complete lack of military experience of the majority of the volunteers together with an unwillingness to train and submit to military discipline made them useless as soldiers. Maximov also noted that many of the volunteers had also than altruistic reasons for coming to the Transvaal as they had hopes that they might share in all the wealth created by the gold of the Witwatersrand as opposed to their professed idealistic reasons. Augustus wrote that the Transvaal had become "a paradise for adventurers and rogues of all kinds". Maximov's diary is full of scathing comments about these men whom he viewed as scum, calling them lazy, insubordinate, useless, greedy and cowardly. The strict discipline that Maximov imposed in training the volunteers of the European Legion made him unpopular and the fact he had served in the Corps of the Gendarmes made especially unpopular with the Russian volunteers. One French volunteer wrote "...the Russians who could not pardon his position as a police officer and even professed a certain contempt for him". The Hollander Corps consisting of Dutch volunteers, most of whom had come for idealistic reasons, were considered to be the most effective of the European volunteers, and the best fit for Maximov who wanted men under his command who were willing to fight and die instead of the disreputable types who had come to the Transvaal hoping to get rich quick. The men of the European Legion were issued with Martini-Henry rifles, which was regarded as a good rifle, but were not provided with the superior Mauser rifles, which the Boers kept for themselves.

On 30 April 1900, Maximov led the Hollander Corps in the Battle of Thaba Nchu, where he was seriously wounded. During the battle, Maximov fought with the British Army Captain Beachcroft Towse and fired the shot that blinded Towse in both eyes while at the same time Towse fired a shot into Maximov. As Towse was awarded a Victoria Cross, the battle of Tabu Nchu brought international attention to Maximov, through the British press wrongly reported that Maximov had been killed. At Taba Nchu, Maximov suffered a splintered shoulder, a badly damaged shoulder blade and a serious wound to his skull, which rendered him unfit for further military service, leading to him being honourably discharged from the Transvaal service. One of the Transvaal leaders, State Secretary Francis William Reitz told the Russian nurse Sophia Izedinova:

"You know, sister...that I am not greatly impressed by all these foreigners who come offering us their services, but concerning your countryman, I am happy to say that we were both mistaken in our caution. All our commandos who have come into contact with Colonel Maximov praise his bravery, his ability to discipline men and the value of his advice. General Louis Botha said that although he is no coward himself and has seen many brave men, he not only never saw, but never imagined anything like the bravery of this Russian colonel. And one of the Dutch who served under him, said that one couldn't but follow him, he is a real leader."

The Russian historians' Apollon Davidson and Irina Filatova cautioned that judging from the gushy tone that Izedinova always used when discussing Maximov in her book Neskolko Mesiatsev u Burov that she was clearly infatuated with him, and her picture of him may have been somewhat idealised, but at the same time noted that other people who knew Maximov in South Africa also spoke about him in a very admiring way. In May 1900, Maximov was elected a veggeneraal (fighting general) by the Transvaal burgers, but the extent of his injuries prevented him from assuming command. Together with de Villebois-Mareuil, Maximov was the only non-Boer to serve as a veggeneraal, and he was the only one elected to that position as de Villebois-Mareuil was appointed by President Kruger. Izedinova's partiality towards Maximov was due to the fact she was in love with him, but Bron who was rather more critical wrote about how at the last session of Transvaal Volksraad (People's Council), two special chairs of honour were brought in for:

"...the Irish publicist and patriot Michael Davitt with his long beard and still young face and the wounded and profusely bandaged General Maximov. Before the entry of President Kruger there occurred a small incident which it gladdens me to be able to record. The chairman, General Lukas Meyer, had already taken his seat, when General Smuts went to him and drew his attention to something in the hall. Then he got up, descended from his elevated seat and approaching General Maximov, publicly thanked him on his own behalf and that of all his comrades, for his services to their country and for the blood he had shed in its defence. Still weak from his wounds, Maximov was confused and, partially rising, murmured something about the insignificance of his services."

After the fall of Johannesburg and Pretoria at the end of May 1900, Maximov left the Transvaal as his wounds made him unfit for guerrilla warfare.

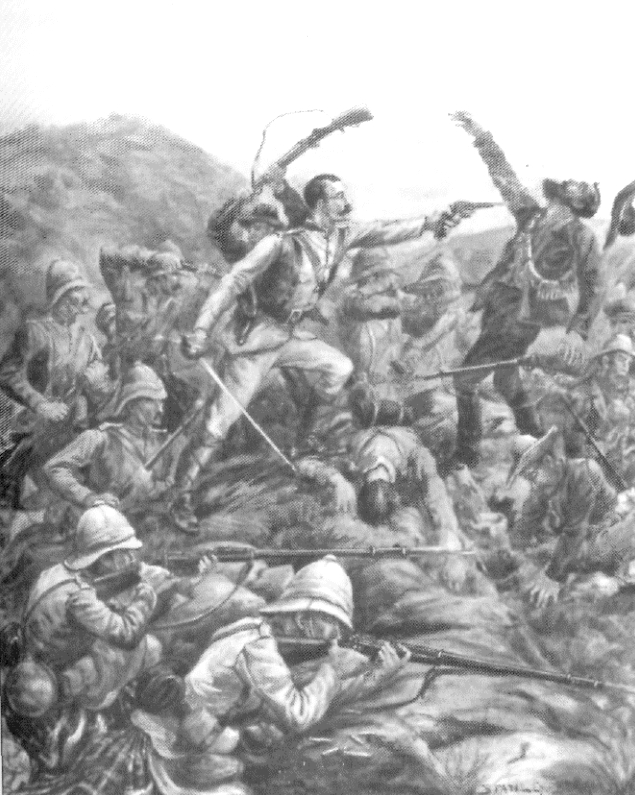
Captain Towse shoots at Lt Col Maximov at point-blank range

On 13 February 1902, President Kruger from his exile in the Netherlands sent Maximov a telegram reading:

"Your services to my Fatherland were extraordinarily important and deserve great respect. Motivated by the absolutely selfless impulse of your soul, you have fulfilled your duty as an able and fearless representative of the Volunteer Commando under your leadership,-and I am convinced that if it were not for the inevitable circumstances that made you leave, you would have still continued to fight for the sacred cause of liberty and justice, which you so nobly considered to be your duty. Let everything that you have done during your lifetime be the source of great moral satisfaction for you, and let happiness and prosperity be your destiny. This is my sincere wish".

== Murder case ==
Upon his return to Russia, Maximov happened to be riding in the same railroad car as the mistress of the German nobleman Prince Alexander von Sayn-Wittgenstein-Berleburg, who was serving as one of the bodyguards of the Emperor Nicholas II. The prince was travelling with four women to St. Petersburg, all of whom had been drinking heavily that night and Maximov did little to hide his disapproval of the dissolute lifestyle of the prince, feeling that he was using his great wealth to exploit Russian women. Prince Sayn-Wittgenstein-Berleburg was married, and Maximov disapproved of him openly keeping a mistress. As she sensed his disapproval of her, she began to insult him in French, calling him a coward who tried to take his own life after discovering his fiancée was sleeping with another man. After she insulted him, he insulted her back, leading to Prince Sayn-Wittgenstein-Berleburg to challenge him to a duel. Maximov tried to refuse the duel, but as he was unwilling to apologize to Sayn-Wittgenstein-Berleburg's mistress as she insulted him first, being only willing to express regret for calling her a "whore" who had sold herself to a foreigner, he felt he no choice but to go through with the duel as he did not wish to be seen as a coward.

Maximov knew that as an expert marksman, he could easily kill the prince, and decided to let his opponent fire the first shot and he would then shoot Sayn-Wittgenstein-Berleburg in the leg. Unknown to both men, the seconds in the duel had deliberately overloaded their guns to make them shoot too high, so that nobody would be killed; as a result Sayn-Wittgenstein-Berleburg wildly overshot and missed Maximov, but Maximov's attempt to shoot him in the leg instead led to the bullet going into his chest, killing him. The death of Prince von Sayn-Wittgenstein-Berleburg in the duel in St. Petersburg on 16 August 1901 attracted massive media attention all over Europe. The House of Sayn-Wittgenstein-Berleburg was a cadet branch of the House of Sayn-Wittgenstein, one of the oldest aristocratic families in Germany, ensuring a media circus after Maximov was charged with the murder of Prince Sayn-Wittgenstein-Berleburg.

Maximov was convicted of murder in a sensational trial in 1902, but he was pardoned by the Emperor Nicholas II.

== Final years and death ==
After Maximov's release from prison, friends of Sayn-Wittgenstein-Berleburg tried to poison him at a party and failing that, threw him from a third story window, causing Maximov to suffer several broken ribs. Maximov then married a much younger woman, Maria Nikolaievna, who bore him a son, Alexander. In February 1904, Maximov tried to volunteer to fight in the Russian-Japanese war, saying he was outraged by the Japanese Navy attacking the Russian Pacific Fleet while anchored at night at the Russian naval base in Port Arthur (modern Lüshun, China) without a declaration of war, and was refused. Maximov wrote: "My heart sank when I read in Constantinople where I was the permanent correspondent of the Novoie Vremia of the treacherous attack of the Japanese on the Port Arthur fleet. When their challenge was answered and His Majesty declared war, I could not stand aside."

After writing to the Dowager Empress, Dagmar of Denmark, Maximov was permitted to rejoin the Imperial Russian Army in September 1904. Maria Maximova stated she was convinced that her husband had gone to Manchuria with the purpose of being killed in action. From Mukden (modern Shenyang, China), Maximov sent off his last telegram to his wife, wishing her and their son well. On 1 October 1904 (Julian)/14 October (Gregorian) Maximov was killed in action fighting against the Japanese on the plains of Manchuria in the Battle of Shaho. In his death, Maximov was able to regain the honour that he lost in life, and Russian newspapers described him as a hero.

== Sources ==
- Davidson, Apollon; Filatova, Irina (1998). The Russians and the Anglo-Boer War, 1899-1902. Cape Town: Human & Rousseau. ISBN 0-7981-3804-1.
- Kandyba-Foxcroft, Elisaveta (1981). Russia and the Anglo-Boer War, 1899-1902. Cape Town: Cum Books. ISBN 978-0869842126.
- Jones, Anthony David (2000). The Boer Army, 1899-1902: A Military Handbook. Luton: Military Press. ISBN 0854202358.
- Judd, Denis; Surridge, Keith (2013). The Boer War: A History. London: I.B.Tauris. ISBN 9781780765914.
- Pretorius, Fransjohan (2010). ""Welcome, But Not That Welcome: The Relations Between Foreign Volunteers and the Boers in the Anglo-Boer War of 1899-1902"". In Christine Krüger & Sonja Levsen (ed.). War Volunteering in Modern Times: From the French Revolution to the Second World War. London: Macmillan. pp. 122–149. ISBN 9780230290525.
- Waag, Ian van der (January 2005). "Boer Generalship and the Politics of Command". War in History. 12 (1): 15–43. doi:10.1191/0968344505wh306oa. S2CID 220749361.
