= Battle of Chieveley =

Armored train ambush during the Second Boer War

Coordinates: 28°52′24.8″S 29°46′08.2″E

- Part of the Second Boer War
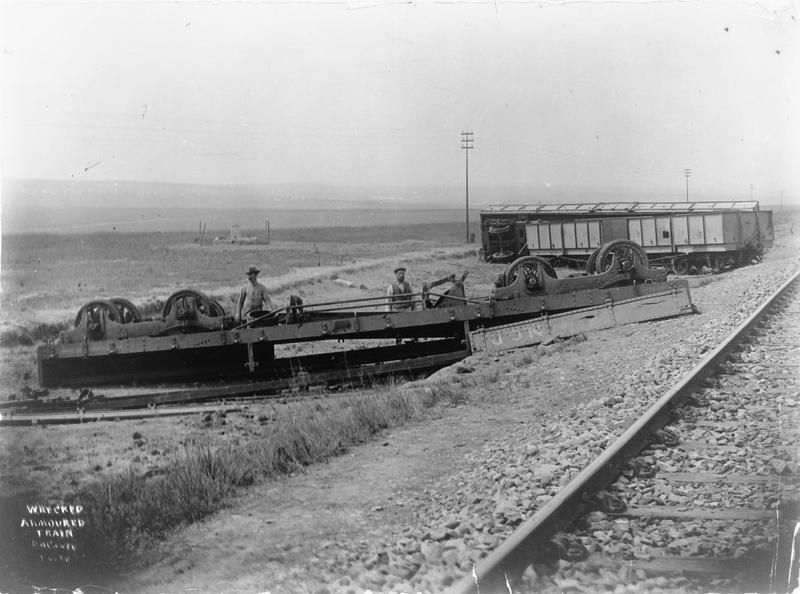
- The armored train wreck at Chieveley, c. 1900
Date	15 November 1899
Location	Chieveley, South Africa
Result	Boer victory

Belligerents
(United Kingdom of Great Britain and Ireland) British Empire	South African Republic: Italian Volunteer Legion

Commanders and leaders
(United Kingdom of Great Britain and Ireland) Charles Long (United Kingdom of Great Britain and Ireland) Aylmer Haldane	(South African Republic) Louis Botha (South African Republic) Sarel Oosthuizen (South African Republic) Camillo Ricchiardi

Strength
120 men	~200 Boers

Casualties and losses
2 killed 20 wounded 80 captured	Unknown

The Battle of Chieveley took place on 15 November 1899, and was an ambush on a British armored train travelling from Estcourt to Colenso in a reconnaissance mission. Boer forces under the command of Louis Botha, which comprised primarily the Italian Volunteer Legion, ambushed the armored train, and derailed it, taking most of the British soldiers prisoner. Commanding the British forces on the armored train was Colonel Charles James Long, who had received reports a day earlier about Boers in the area, hence the reason for sending out the armored train.

== Background ==
After the Boers surrounded and besieged the British garrison under General White at Ladysmith on 2 November, the remaining Natal Field Force headed south towards Colenso and Estcourt. On 3 November, the Boers fired on the garrison at Colenso, and they subsequently retreated from their position, and joined the rest of the Force at Estcourt. On 9 November, an armored train had made its way to Colenso, where it observed the Boer positions and the abandoned British defenses. Boer forces under Louis Botha advanced south from the Tugela River, and moved to occupy Weenen.

== Battle ==
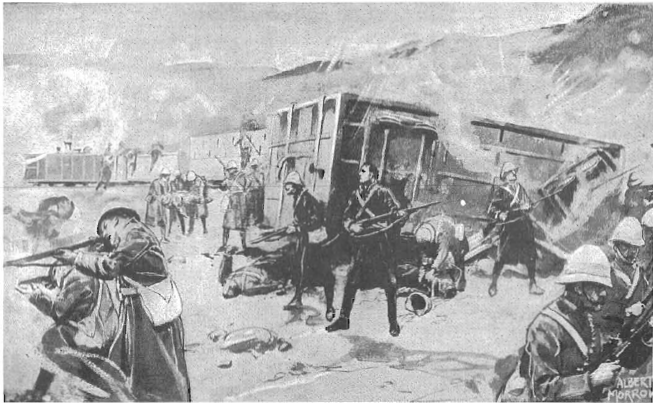
Contemporary illustration of the battle

On 15 November, Colonel Long organized a reconnaissance force to head from Estcourt to Colenso, as they had received reports of Boers heading towards Estcourt and Weenen. The train passed Frere station, and Natal Police reported that all was clear ahead. The train continued towards Colenso when they passed a Boer position 600 yards away from them. The artillery on board the train opened fire, followed in quick succession by the riflemen, and the train reversed in order to get closer to the Boer position. Just a bit further past was a ridge, in which Boer artillery and a Maxim "Pom Pom" was situated. The Boers opened fire with their artillery and derailed the three train cars. Winston Churchill, who was present as a correspondent, along with Lt. Frankland, managed to pile the wounded onto the engine, whilst Captain Haldane held off the Boer forces. The engine was still operational, and Churchill and Frankland sent the train down towards Estcourt, where it reached safety. Churchill then returned to the battlefield to assist Haldane in holding off the Boers. The rest of the forces present tried to hold off the Boers, with a few managing to head back to Estcourt. The rest of the British force was captured by the Boers.

Composition of British Forces present
4 Sailors from the HMS Tartar
4 Sections, Dublin Fusiliers
1 Company, Durban Light Infantry

== Aftermath ==
After the armored train was captured by the Boers, they continued moving south. By 21 November, they had advanced towards Estcourt, where they occupied the hills around the city. The British forces were worried that the Boers would move south and occupy Pietermaritzburg, and the city began construction of earthworks, and stationing naval guns on the nearby hills. The Boers, under General Joubert, moved further south, reaching the hills in an area called Willow Grange. Walter Kitchener dispatched forces from further down the line in order to halt the Boer advance on 23 November, resulting in the Battle of Willow Grange. Whilst the battle was a loss, it halted the Boer advance, and Joubert withdrew his troops on 24 November, retiring to Colenso. Buller and his relief force soon arrived, and began pushing towards Colenso and the besieged city of Ladysmith.
