= Desmond Sacco =

South African businessman

- Born: Johannesburg, South Africa
- Occupation: Businessman

Desmond Sacco is a South African businessman. He serves as Chairman and Managing Director of Assore Limited (JSE: ASR).

== Early life ==
Desmond Sacco was born in Johannesburg, South Africa. His father, Guido Sacco, founded the Assore Group in 1928. He received a Bachelor of Science in Geology from the University of the Witwatersrand, where he played cricket and hockey.

== Career ==
In 1968, Sacco joined the Assore Group, a public company traded on the Johannesburg Stock Exchange founded by his father four decades earlier. He was appointed to its board of directors in 1974, and has served as its Chairman and Managing Director since 1992. He also serves as Chairman of Assmang Limited.

Sacco is a fellow of the Institute of Directors and the Geological Society of South Africa.

Sacco was worth US$1.1 billion in 2018.

=== Personal life ===
Sacco resides in his hometown of Johannesburg. He is married, and has two children.
