= Leo Pokrowsky =

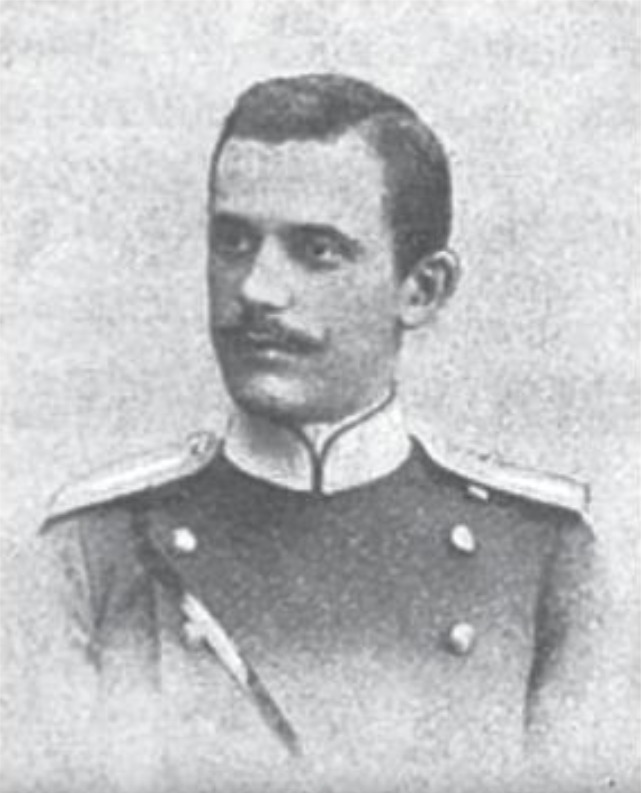
Leo Pokrowsky before heading to South Africa

Leo Pokrowsky (died 25 December 1900 in Utrecht, Kwazulu Natal, South Africa) was a Pole and Captain in the Russian Army, who fought and died on the side of the Boers during the Second Anglo-Boer War. He was killed on Christmas Day 1900 when he and his men attacked the British garrison in Utrecht.

A commemorative plaque to his memory can be seen on the Burgher monument in the town of Utrecht.
