= John Costas (Greek revolutionary) =

- Ιωάννης Παπακώστας
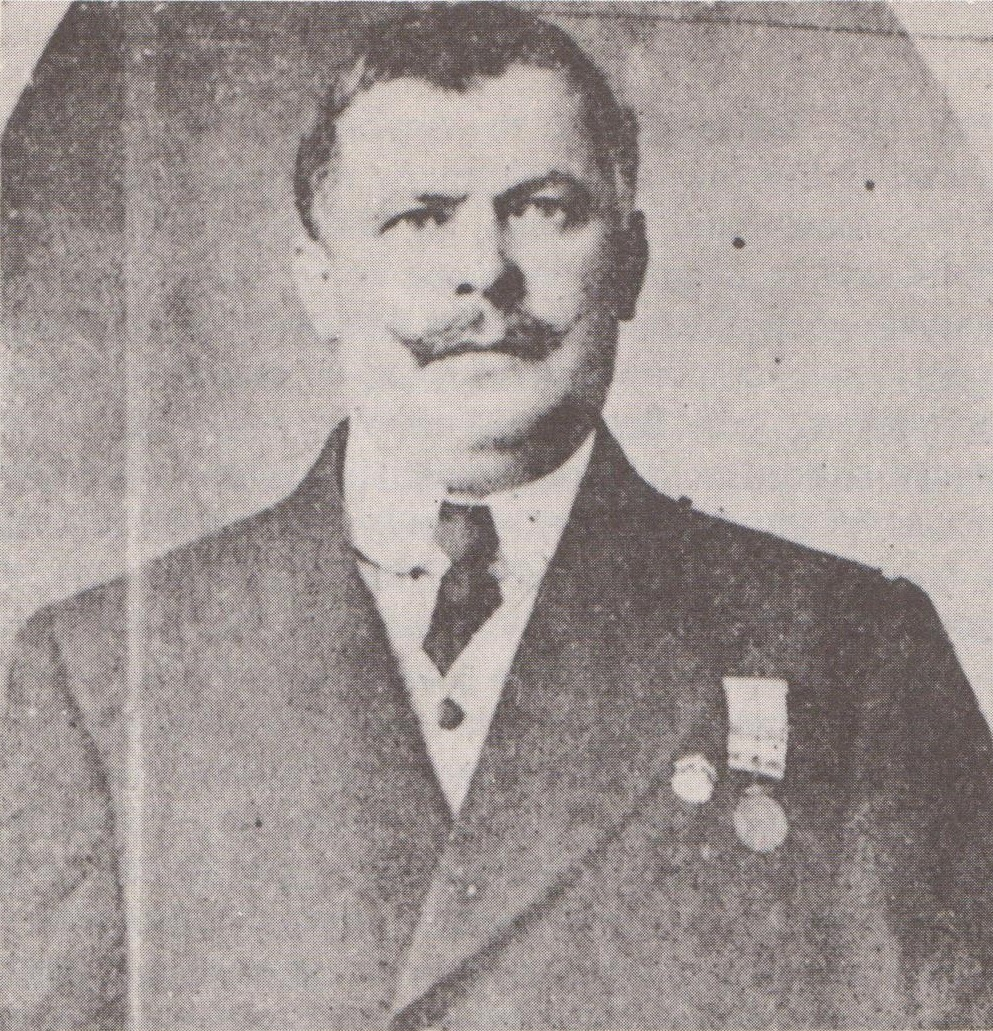
- Costas c. 1913
- Born: Ioannis Papakostas c. 1868; Filiates, Janina Vilayet, Ottoman Empire (now Greece)
- Died: c. 1932; Stellenbosch, Union of South Africa
- Military career
- Allegiance: Orange Free State; South African Republic; Kingdom of Greece; Aut. Rep. Northern Epirus
- Unit: Boer foreign volunteers
- Conflicts: Second Boer War (POW): Battle of Spion Kop; Battle of Paardeberg; Balkan Wars: First Balkan War; North Epirote Struggle

John Costas, born Ioannis Papakostas (Greek: Ιωάννης Παπακώστας; c. 1868–1932), was a Greek revolutionary and veteran of the Second Boer War.

== Biography ==
=== Early life ===
Ioannis Papakostas was born in about 1868 in Lia, a village near the town of Filiates during a period that Epirus was still under Ottoman rule. He was son of a local priest and he emigrated at a young age first to Australia and later to Egypt. In 1898 he arrived in the South African Republic and settled in Johannesburg.

=== Military action ===
During the Second Boer War he became a volunteer on the Boers' side and he fought in various battles, including Spion Kop and Paardeberg. He was taken prisoner after the Boers were defeated. During his captivity, Costas was taken to POW camps in British Ceylon. Like all the other volunteers, Costas joined the Boers out of his love for freedom. He was called "the hero of Modder River" because of his invaluable contribution to the Boer cause during that battle.

In 1903 he was released and returned to South Africa, but eight years later he returned to Greece. He settled in Athens where he was initiated into Epirotan Society, an organisation founded in 1906 and led by people of Epirotan descent like Spyros Spyromilios and Panagiotis Danglis for the purpose of liberating Epirus from Ottoman rule and its unification with Greece.

=== Later life ===
The following years he remained in Greece and but after the defeat of Eleftherios Venizelos' Liberal Party at the 1920 parliamentary elections Costas, who was a Venizelos supporter, left Greece, returned to South Africa and settled in Stellenbosch where he died in 1932.

=== Distinctions ===
For his services to the Greek state, John Costas was honoured with the rank of captain and with a military medal while in 1982 the South African government built a bust in his birthplace, Lia, as a tribute for his participation in the Second Boer War. Moreover, Costas donated an important amount of money for various needs of Lias community.

== Bibliography ==
- Βασίλη Κραψίτη, Σύγχρονοι Ηπειρώτες ευεργέτες (1913–1986), εκδόσεις του συλλόγου "Οι φίλοι του Σουλίου", Athens, 1987.
- E.A. Mantzaris, The Greeks in South Africa, in Richard Clogg (ed.), The Greek Diaspora in the Twentieth Century, Macmillan Press, 1999.
