= Niko Bagration =

Georgian noble and soldier (1868–1933)

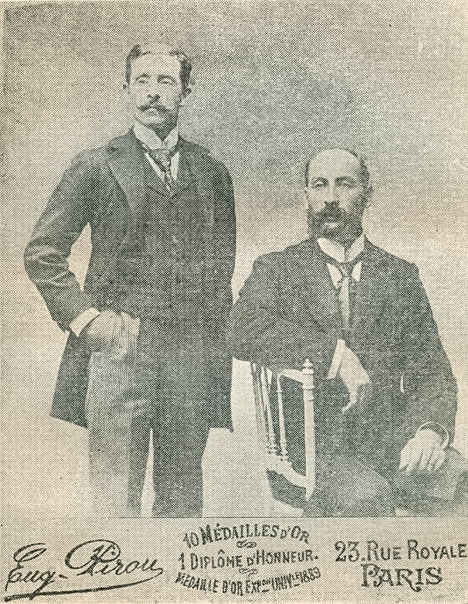
Niko Bagrationi-Mukhraneli (Buri) sitting, his French friend De Breda. Just after released from the English captivity

Niko Bagrationi (Georgian: ნიკო ბაგრატიონი; Russian: Николай Багратион, Nikolay Georgievich Bagration) (1868–1933) was a Georgian nobleman who fought as a volunteer officer in the Boer army during the Second Boer War (Anglo-Boer war). He was also known in Georgia as Niko the Boer (ნიკო ბური, Niko Buri).

Son of Prince George Nikolaevich Bagration. A member of the Mukhrani branch of the Bagrationi family (formerly a royal dynasty of Georgia), he was born at the Mukhrani castle near Tbilisi (then Tiflis, Imperial Russia). He represented Georgian nobility at the Russian Tsar Alexander III’s coronation in 1881.

In 1899, he attended the Paris international exhibition and was going to leave for big-game hunting when he heard that the Anglo-Boer war had broken out. He later wrote in his memoirs that although he had never heard of the Transvaal until then, its struggle for independence reminded him of his motherland. Thus, he was the first volunteer from Russia to arrive in Pretoria where he was welcomed by the Boer statesman Paul Kruger and his generals. Prince Bagrationi quickly won popularity among the Boers and was promoted to colonel. Later, he was taken prisoner by the British and summoned by Lord Kitchener to explain his conduct – a memorable confrontation in which he accused Kitchener of atrocities. He escaped execution because of his royal descent and was exiled to St Helena, where he remained very cheerful and organizing sports and other activities for his fellow prisoners.

He was soon released, and Bagrationi returned to France and then to Georgia, where he wrote a memoir, Burebtan ("With the Boers"; published in Tbilisi, 1951), about his experiences in South Africa. After the Sovietization of Georgia in 1921, he openly opposed Bolshevik rule and lost his property, but surprisingly survived the 1920s purges that targeted Georgian nobility. He ended his days in poverty, selling cigarettes at the Tbilisi marketplace, still dressed in princely garments.

Prince Bagrationi married, in 1902, Anna Buchkiashvili (1883-1959). They were the parents of

- Constantine (1903, died infant)
- George (1905, died infant)
- Natalia (1903, Tbilisi, - 1979, Paris), married at Paris, in 1931, Jean Eugène Marie Victor Tourangin (1885-1977)
- Rusudan (1905, Tbilisi, - 1986, Tbilisi), married Ivane Chikvaidze (1900-1979)
- Alexandre (1908-1934)
- Irina (1916, Tbilisi, - 2000, Paris), a participant in the French Resistance during World War II

== See also ==
- Boer Foreign Volunteers
