= Italian Volunteer Legion =

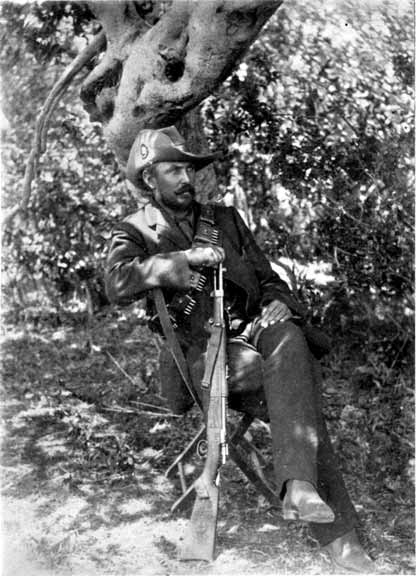
- General Louis Botha the leader of the Italian Volunteer Legion in the Second Boer War
- Active: 1899–1902
- Allegiance: Orange Free State; South African Republic (Volkstaat) Cape Boers
- Branch: Boer Army – Boer foreign volunteers: Italian volunteers also served in the Second Irish Brigade
- Type: Commandos
- Role: Guerrilla warfare, scouting, explosives handling
- Size: 200
- Nickname: Italian Scouts
- Engagements: Second Boer War

Commanders
- Notable commanders: General Louis Botha; Camillo Ricchiardi

The Italian Volunteer Legion (Afrikaans: Italiaansche Verkennings Corp), also known as the Italian Scouts were an expatriate military unit which took part in the Anglo-Boer War, raised and led by soldier and adventurer Camillo Ricchiardi on behalf of General Louis Botha.

== Prior events: Italian immigration to South Africa ==
The flow of Italian migrants to South Africa started after the discovery of the first diamonds in 1867 and became steady at the end of the 19th century although it never reached the huge numbers of immigration to Argentina or the United States, which remained the favorite destinations of Italians seeking better living conditions abroad. Nevertheless, the Italian population in South Africa totaled roughly 5,000 people scattered between various cities. A high number, considering that Johannesburg counted 80,000 inhabitants at the time. One of the first immigrant communities was hired for the production of explosives: the Modderfontein dynamite factory was searching for skilled workers just as its equivalent in Avigliana was in financial difficulties. So, more than half of the workers and their families were transferred from Piedmont to Johannesburg, where a city section was promptly named "Little Italy" and the suburb of Orange Grove also increased its Italian population. Only a few of them accepted the harsh conditions of mining or living off the land; most were employed as stonemasons, bricklayers, artisans, cabinet makers, metal workers. In some factories such as the "Thomas Begbie and Son Foundry" three-quarters of the 200 or so workforce was Italian.

When the "Transvaal and Diggers" newspaper published the words of the State Mining Engineer, who was convinced that foul play was intended, and later added that the failed Jameson Raid had also been followed by a similar dynamite explosion, it fueled the suspicion of Uitlander complicity. In addition, Begbie's notorious anti-Boer stance contributed to pushing many Italians towards the Boer side. Botha was brought to trial for the factory explosion, but was later acquitted.

== Formation ==
As a consequence of this, Ricchiardi created the "Italian Volunteer Legion", which was somewhat disproportionate to the numbers of the Italian community (only 200 members), but it took advantage from guerrilla tactics that its leader had learned in the Philippines.

The Italians mainly saw service as Scouts, renowned for their riding and shooting skills. Others, being expert in the handling of explosives, were tasked with blowing up bridges and railway lines to hamper the British retreat from Tugela to Komatiepoort on the Mozambiquean border. They received orders not to set off charges until the British – recognizable from their white pith helmets – were near. On one such occasion they were so near that the British were able to spot and extinguish the fuses underneath a bridge, thwarting the destruction attempt at the last second.

The first successful operation planned by Camillo Ricchiardi and carried out by the Italian Legion was the Battle of Chieveley, in which the legion ambushed and captured an armored train. Winston Churchill was among the passengers who were taken prisoners by the Italians.

Many members of the Legion were Italian expatriates to Argentina, who joined Ricchiardi's forces after serving as horse breeders for the British since their second homeland was supplying a great many of them for the Empire's cavalry forces.

Among Italians who became well known in the war was Dr. Umberto Cristini, who joined the Italian Scouts after leaving General de Wet's commando on the Western Front. Such was his admiration of De Wet that he asked his permission to add the General's name to his own baptised name, becoming Umberto "Dewet" Cristini. In fact at one stage it seemed he would even marry one of de Wet's daughters.

He returned to the Transvaal to rejoin the war. In a letter to his mother he even mentions the fact that though everyone may have thought he went back only to fight, his other intention was to 'help find the greatest treasure anyone could imagine'. (Maybe the Kruger Millions). To this end Ricchiardi was even reported by the British Army to having been spotted in the Pretoria Station well after his departure. Cristini fought right up to the end of the war then remained in South Africa for some years ending up by training local athletes, some world famous, such as world class South African runner Jack Donaldson and marathon runner Charles Hefferon, in Cape Town. On his return to Europe became the assistant trainer of Georges Carpentier, the French world boxing-champion in 1912. A man who thrived on wars, he was implicated in the 1908 assassination of King Carlos of Portugal with a group of anarchists in an attempt to overthrow the Braganza Dynasty, which finally occurred in 1910. Arrested, he managed to escape to Spain where he spent several months. From there he moved to France where he joined the French army and was killed in action in the battle of Argonne in 1915.

Ciccio de Giovanni, a 12-year-old boy who made an unexpected visit to the laager of the Italian Scouts to see his father Giovanni serving in the unit. He rode all the way from Johannesburg, some 400 km, on his own.

Conversely, Peppino Garibaldi, Giuseppe's nephew, joined the British side and found himself fighting against Scout Pilade Sivelli, whose father was the youngest among the "One Thousand Redshirts" who had participated in the unification of Italy.
Another Italian by the name of Dr. M. Ricono, a prominent surgeon from Cape Town, offered the British his services. Of the 3,000 or so Italians who resided on the Reef just some 1,200 were left after the war.

== See also ==
- Boer foreign volunteers
- Camillo Ricchiardi
