= George Nikolaevich Bagration =

Prince Giorgi Nikolozis dze Bagration of Mukhrani (Georgian: გიორგი ნიკოლოზის ძე ბაგრატიონ მუხრანელი) (1834–1882) was a Georgian nobleman of the House of Mukhrani. Prince George was son of Prince Nicholas Bagration of Mukhrani and Princess Tamar Jorjadze.

George married Ekaterine Aleksi-Meskhishvili (1845–1905) and they had 17 children:

- Revaz Bagration of Mukhrani
- Rostevan Bagration of Mukhrani
- Kaikhosro Bagration of Mukhrani
- Jesse Bagration of Mukhrani
- Giorgi Bagration of Mukhrani
- Teimuraz Bagration of Mukhrani
- Petre Bagration of Mukhrani
- Vakhtang Bagration of Mukhrani (born 1862)
- Levan Bagration of Mukhrani (1863-1901)
  - Simon Bagration
- Niko Bagrationi "the Boer" (1865-1933)
- Irakli Bagration of Mukhrani (born 1867)
- Ivane Bagration of Mukhrani (1868-1889)
- Mikheil Bagration of Mukhrani (1872-1942)
- Alexander Bagration of Mukhrani (1873-1892)
- David Bagration of Mukhrani (1877-1940)
- Ilia Bagration of Mukhrani (1878-1885)
- Tamar Bagration of Mukhrani (1881-1960)
