= Boshof =

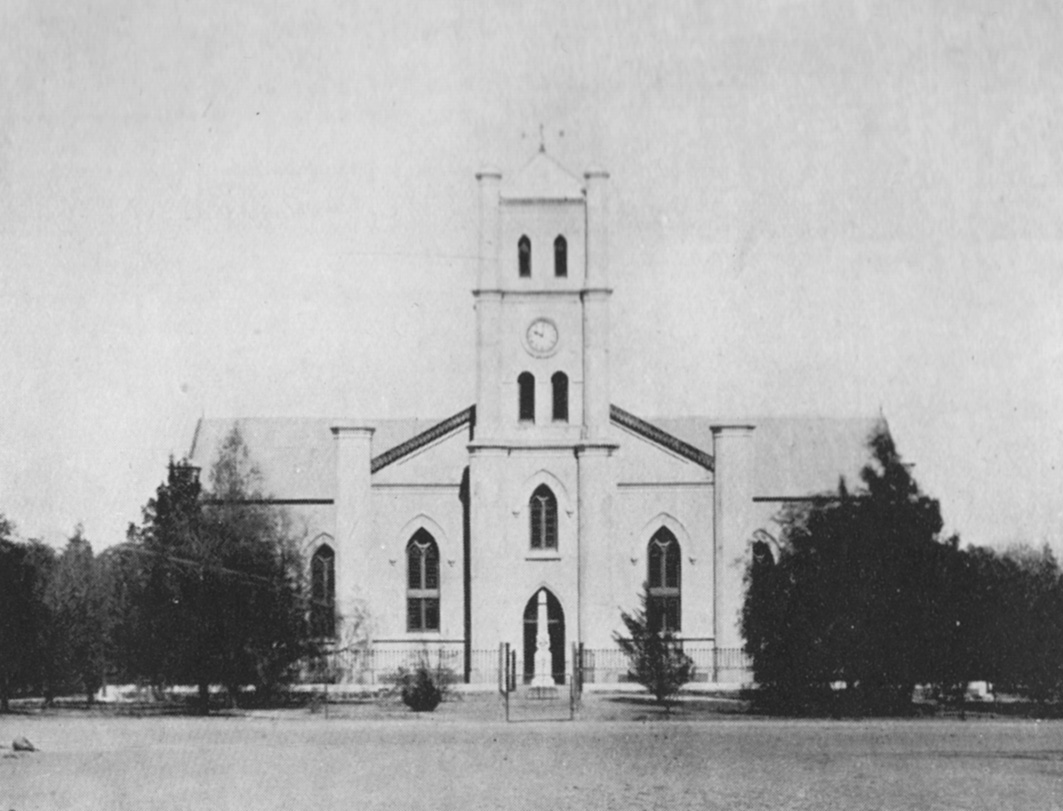
- The Dutch Reformed Church in Boshof, c. 1917

- Location within Free State (South African province) Location within South Africa
- Coordinates: 28°33′S 25°14′E
- Country: South Africa
- Province: Free State
- District: Lejweleputswa
- Municipality: Tokologo
- Established: 1856

Area
  - Total: 91.7 km^{2} (35.4 sq mi)

Population (2011)
  - Total: 8,509
  - Density: 92.8/km^{2} (240/sq mi)

Racial makeup (2011)
  - Black African: 78.5%
  - Coloured: 10.5%
  - Indian/Asian: 0.4%
  - White: 10.1%
  - Other: 0.5%

First languages (2011)
  - Tswana: 57.9%
  - Afrikaans: 28.7%
  - Sotho: 4.4%
  - Xhosa: 3.8%
  - Other: 5.1%
- Time zone: UTC+2 (SAST)
- Postal code (street): 8340
- PO box: 8340
- Area code: 053

Boshof is a small rural farming town located in the western part of the Free State province, South Africa.

The town is approximately 55 km north-east of Kimberley along the R64 road. It serves as the administrative centre of the Tokologo Local Municipality within the Lejweleputswa District and is known for mixed farming activities, including livestock and crop production.

== History ==
=== Early Settlement ===
The area that would become Boshof was originally part of territories inhabited by Griqua and other indigenous groups. Historical records from the mid-19th century indicate that Dutch farmers began crossing the Orange River into the region around 1816–1820, initially for seasonal grazing during droughts in the Cape Colony. By the 1830s, larger groups of immigrants, including Voortrekkers from the Great Trek who settled permanently. One such group purchased land from a Griqua chief named Dautzeo, establishing farms in what is now the Boshof district. This purchase formed the basis for early European presence in the area, as documented in contemporary sketches of the Orange Free State.

=== Etymology ===
Boshof was established in March 1856 on the farm Vanwyksvlei, and named after Jacobus Nicolaas Boshof (1808-1881), second President of the Orange Free State (1855–59) and founder of its civil service.

=== Early Development ===
During its early years, Boshof functioned as a district centre in the Orange Free State, with a focus on agriculture and grazing. The Modder River skirted the district, providing water resources essential for farming. By 1872, it had achieved municipal status, indicating growth in local governance and infrastructure. The town's development was supported by the Dutch Reformed Church, which played a key role in community organization, education, and religious life.

=== Second Anglo-Boer War ===
During the 2nd Anglo-Boer War the local commando was involved in the siege of Kimberley, notably to disrupt the city's water supply at Riverton. The Battle of Boshof, which resulted in the death of the Comte de Villebois-Mareuil, was fought nearby on 5 April 1900.

== 20th Century and Modern Era ==
In the post-war period, Boshof remained a quiet agricultural hub, benefiting from its proximity to Kimberley's diamond mining industry, though it never became a major mining centre itself. The town experienced demographic shifts over the 20th century, influenced by rural-urban migration. By the 2011 census, Boshof had a diverse racial population of about 8,509.
