= George de Villebois-Mareuil =

French army officer and writer (1847–1900)

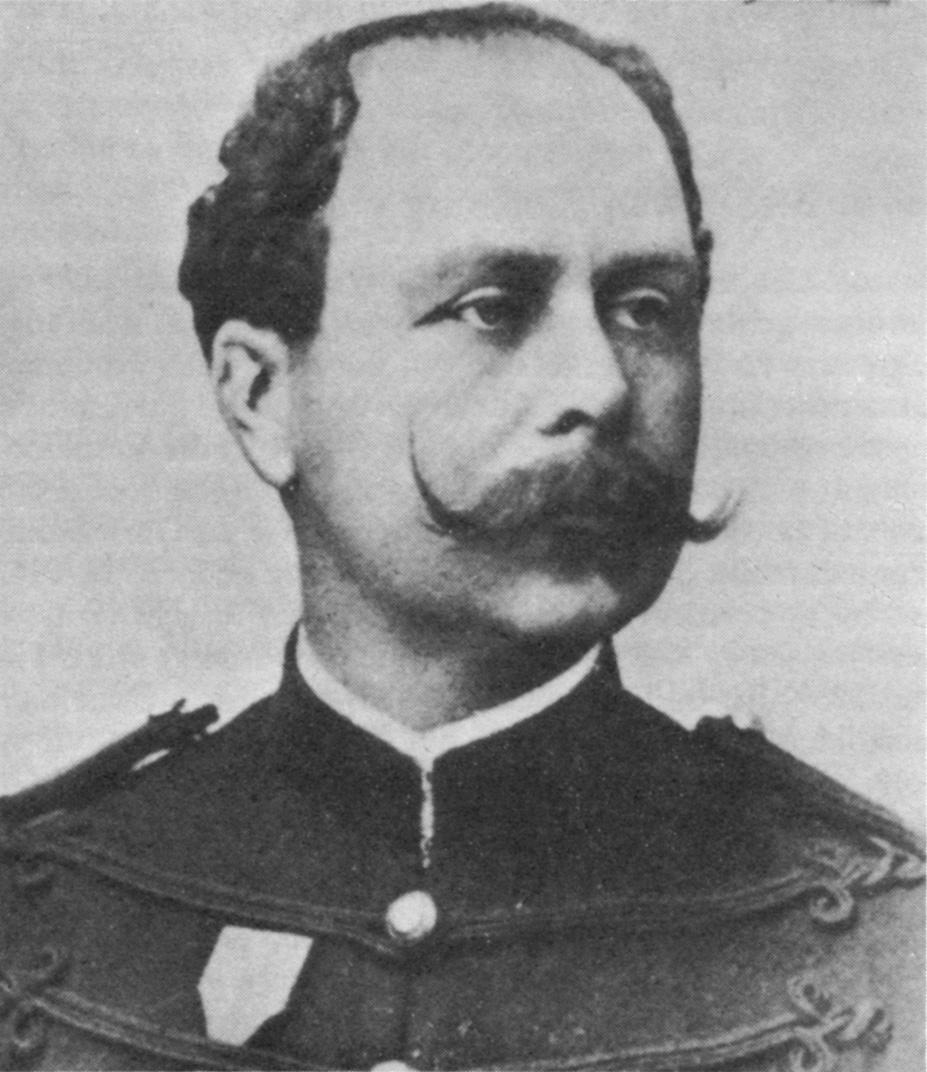
Villebois-Mareuil in 1900

George Henri Anne-Marie Victor, Count de Villebois-Mareuil (22 March 1847 – 6 April 1900) was a French army officer and writer who served in the Franco-Prussian War, French conquest of Tunisia and Second Boer War. In 1899, he went to Southern Africa as a foreign volunteer to fight for the Boer republics against the British. Villebois-Mareuil was motivated to fight in the war due to his anti-British sentiment stemming from the Fashoda Incident. He was promoted to the rank of major general in Boer service but was killed in action only months after arriving in Southern Africa.

== Early life ==
George Henri Anne-Marie Victor, Count de Villebois-Mareuil was born on 22 March 1847 in Montaigu, Brittany. He studied at the École spéciale militaire de Saint-Cyr as a cadet, graduating in 1867. Upon his graduation, Villebois-Mareuil was commissioned into the French Army at the rank of second lieutenant. He soon went to French Cochinchina and began serving in the troupes de marine under his uncle, René de Cornulier-Lucinière, who was the governor of Cochinachina. Villebois-Mareuil was promoted to Lieutenant in 1870.

== Franco-Prussian War ==
Villebois-Mareuil returned to France shortly after the outbreak of the Franco-Prussian War in 1871. He joined the 7th Battalion of chasseurs à pied, commanding of the battalion's 6th company. On 28 January, Blois was occupied by the Prussian Army. Villebois-Mareuil participated in the recapture of the city by French forces and distinguished himself under fire despite being badly injured. He refused to be evacuated until the end of the battle and spent weeks on the verge of death. Villebois-Mareuil spend nine months convalescing in a military hospital, after which he was decorated and promoted to captain.

== North Africa ==
In 1877, Villebois-Mareuil began studying at the École Militaire. He graduated in 1881 and was subsequently posted to French Algeria, serving in the Army of Africa during the French conquest of Tunisia. In 1889, Villebois-Mareuil was promoted to major, and three years later was promoted again to colonel. At the age of 45 he was the youngest colonel in the French Army. Villebois-Mareuil was successively given the colonelcy of the 130th and 67th Metropolitan Infantry Regiments. In 1893, he received the news that his wife had died in Marseille after an extended and painful illness. Regarding his wife's death, Villebois-Mareuil stated to a friend in 1896 that "Each time I go to that sad grave in Marseille, I struggle to continue upon life's path, such is my oppressive discouragement."

== Foreign Legion ==
In 1883, France launched the first Madagascar expedition against the Merina Kingdom; Villebois-Mareuil unsuccessfully attempted to join the expedition. A second Madagascar expedition was carried out in 1894, and he joined the French Foreign Legion's 1st Foreign Regiment at Sidi Bel Abbès in 1895 to strengthen his chances of being selected to go to Magascar. Commanding the regiment for six months, Villebois-Mareuil was infuriated when he was not part of the regiment's battalions chosen to join the expedition, and decided to leave the French Army in 1896. He subsequently founded the Union of Regimental Societies, writing essays on military topics and advocating for the far-right and French nationalist views espoused by Charles Maurras. He was one of the founding members of Action Française before it became a prominent monarchist organisation.

== Second Boer War and death ==
In 1899, the Second Boer War broke out between the Boer republics and Britain. Villebois-Mareuil saw the conflict as a way for him to avenge the French national humiliation at the 1898 Fashoda Incident. He once stated in regard to the war:

But she (Britain) can be sure that this tricolour flag, grabbed from Fachoda and ripped to shreds in London, was brought to Pretoria by French Volunteers, and has taken its place next to those of the Southern Boer Republics to support their independence against the oppressors. She gave us a Hundred Years' War, and for a hundred years she has robbed the farmers from the Cape. Since then she has violated every peace treaty. Her hatred being even fiercer against the Boer, for there is French blood flowing through their veins."

Villebois-Mareuil arrived in Lourenço Marques on 22 November 1899. Crossing into Boer-held territory, in December he was commissioned into the Boer armies at the rank of major by General Piet Joubert, and fought in the Second Battle of Colenso. Due to his leadership capabilities, Villebois-Mareuil was promoted to major general and became commander of all foreign volunteers on 17 March 1900. The average age of his troops was 30 with the youngest being a 17-year old private. He held the German troops under his command in high regard despite their lack of unity. Villebois-Mareuil did not have the same views towards the Dutch soldiers under him due to their apparent lack of courage and eagerness for battle; the Dutch were often referred to by Boers themselves as lowly drunkards. He summed his views on the Boers as follows: "Noble and of good race for the most, they live on their farm like in the castles of old, free and isolated... These people are standing up in the face of the whole world defying the decline of our too advanced civilizations."

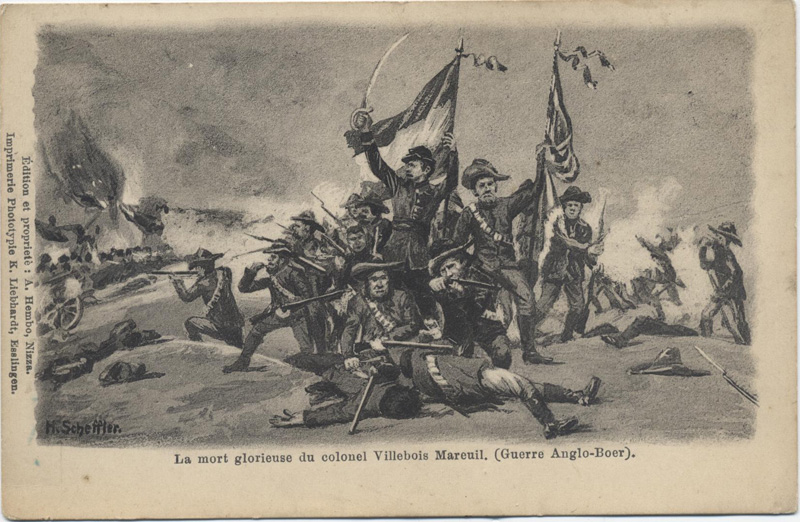
A French postcard depicting Villebois-Mareuil's death at Boshof

In early 1900, Villebois-Mareuil's Black assistant fled and informed nearby British forces of the position of his troops. On 6 April, he died leading 120 of his men against 750 British troops under Lord Chesham on a hill near Boshof. Villebois-Mareuil's Boer allies saw they were being outflanked by the British and requested permission to withdraw, but he refused, hoping for a coming thunderstorm to aid him. The Boers decided to leave without orders, leaving Villebois-Mareuil and his men alone against the advancing British force. Within a few hours of fighting, Villebois-Mareuil was killed by a British artillery shell and morale sank amongst his surviving men, who soon surrendered. His corpse was taken to Boshof and given a full military burial by the British, which was paid for by Lord Methuen out of his own pocket. His body was exhumed and reburied in Magersfontein in 1971.

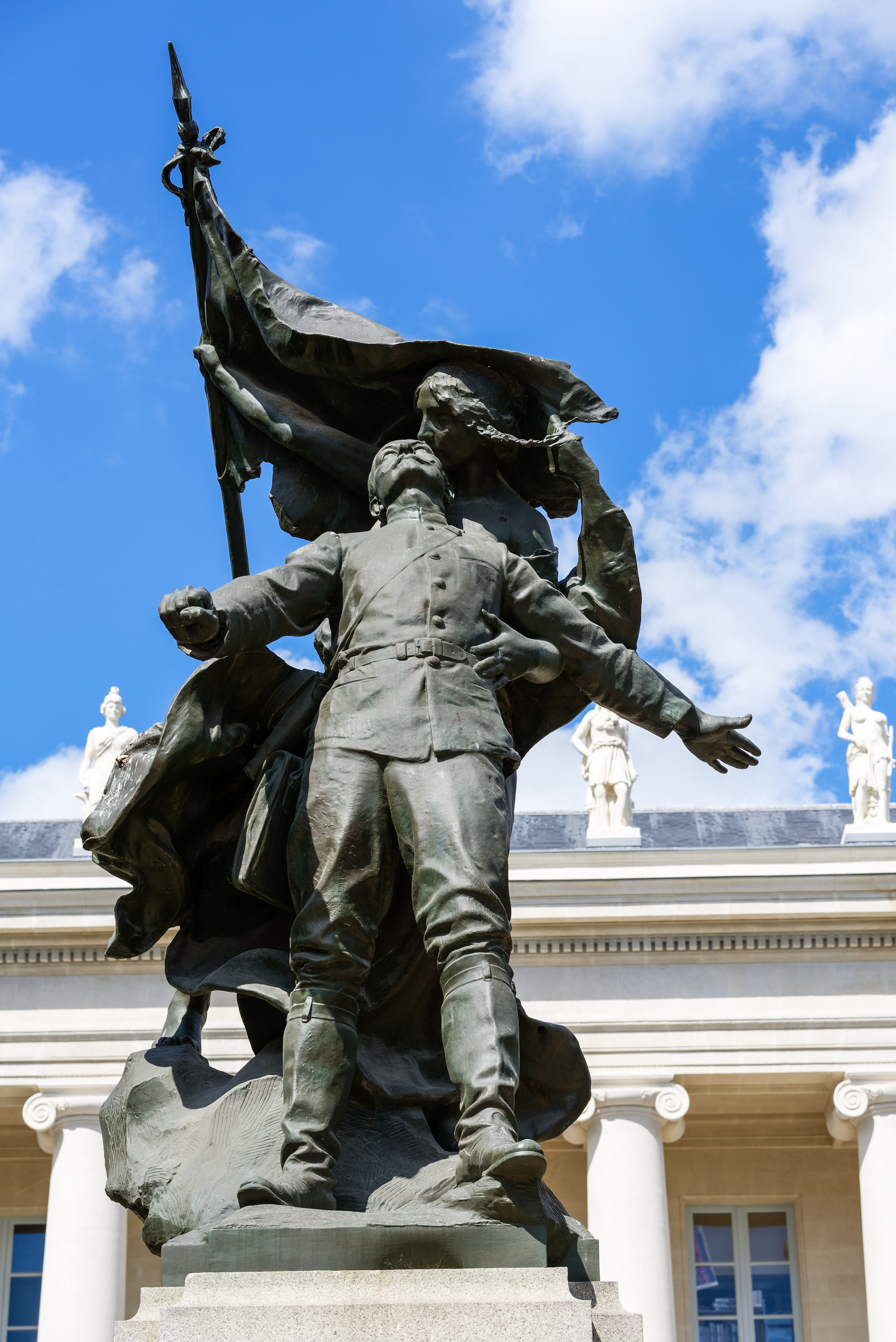
Statue of Villebois-Mareuil in Nantes by Raoul Verlet

A song was composed in his honour by Théodore Botrel which read:

A Villebois de Mareuil	To Villebois de Mareuil
Sa Mort est une apothéose Un example à suivre Demain; Il meurt pour une belle Cause, La Gloire au front, l'Épée en main. Au milieu des Boèrs Il dort pour toujours ! Nos vivats, grâce au Vent qui passe Trouveront son lointain cercueil; Saluons à travers l'Espace Le vaillant Villebois-Mareuil.	His death is a grand finale An example he'll remain He died for a just cause With Glory in his smile, a sword in his fist Amongst his Boers An eternal rest he takes To us of the living wind that blows Find his distant grave Greetings from afar Our own Valiant Villebois-Mareuil

In his memoirs, Villebois-Mareuil recognized the courage and passion of the Boers but reflected on his frustrations with their lack of tactical competence. He regretted the occasions when the Boers could have had major victories, but decided to remain in a defensive position. He advised Joubert in this respect, but the Boers decided to not continue with their push to Cape Town. One week after his death, the Boer Foreign Legion was disbanded and its members placed under General Koos de la Rey to continue with the guerrilla phase of the war. A mass arranged by the Ligue de la patrie française was held in his honour at the Notre-Dame de Paris, which 10,000 people attended. Villebois-Mareuil's horse was transported to Britain by Chesham, where it died in February 1911. Its heart and ceremonial trappings were buried on the village green in Latimer, Buckinghamshire, next to the memorial commemorating those from the locality who had served in South Africa.
