= Camillo Ricchiardi =

Italian journalist, adventurer and soldier

Giuseppe Camillo Pietro Richiardi or Ricchiardi (1865 – 1940) was an Italian journalist, adventurer and soldier. He is best remembered for sparing the life of the young journalist Winston Churchill — whom Ricchiardi saved by feigning ignorance as Churchill discarded his pistol and dum-dum ammunition, both outlawed under penalty of death — after successfully capturing an armored train near Chieveley, Natal.

== Early life ==
Born on 5 July 1865, as son of Giovanni and Rosa (née Volpino), he attended the Modena Military Academy and the Cavalry School in Pinerolo, then he was commissioned as a Second Lieutenant in the Genova Cavalleria Regiment and later promoted to First Lieutenant in the Piemonte Cavalleria Regiment. After six years of service he asked for a discharge and, thanks to his connections to Colonel Girolamo Emilio Gerini, a military advisor in Siam (now Thailand), he moved there and took up the organization of the local army and the education of one of the King's sons. He also worked as a war correspondent, sending reports from China and Ethiopia (some speculate he might have taken part in the battle of Adua). In 1895 he joined General Emilio Aguinaldo as a mercenary in his struggle for the independence of the Philippines from Spain.

== Participation in the Anglo-Boer War ==
In 1899 he moved to South Africa and became a trusted friend of Boer General Louis Botha. Subsequently, Ricchiardi took command of the "Italian Volunteer Legion", a 200-men-strong outfit almost entirely composed by Italians, including immigrants in the Veld and ex-soldiers who had served in the Regio Esercito or under Giuseppe Garibaldi (oddly enough his son Ricciotti supported the Boers, while his grandson Peppino found himself on the British side).

Under Ricchiardi's leadership this unit (also known as the "Latin Brigade" or the "Italian Legion") became distinguished for their close-knitness and skill in performing reconnaissance and other tasks required by asymmetric warfare. It was not only the bravery of the Italian Legion that made him famous, but also his charisma and chivalric attitude toward the enemy: for instance he used to send the personal belongings of British casualties to their families along with a letter of condolences. However, some of his men were full-blown rogues and at times Ricchiardi had to reinstate discipline with stern (but not bloody) measures.

The first successful operation carried out by the Italian Legion was the capture of an armoured train at the Battle of Chieveley. Among the passengers who were taken prisoners there was young journalist Winston Churchill. Upon his return to England, Churchill did not mention having been captured by Italians.

During his stay in South Africa, Ricchiardi married Hannah Guttman, Paul Kruger's granddaughter, who he had met in the Pretoria Military Hospital while recuperating from serious leg wounds he had suffered at the Battle of Tugela. Upon his return to Italy he was busy organizing pro-Boer committees and narrating his adventures in a series of books.

== Later life ==
A keen businessman, he embarked in several ventures whenever he was not at war. One of his partners was Gastone Guerrieri, a grandson of King Victor Emmanuel II. He later moved to Argentina with his friend Louis Baumann where he was appointed administrator of a colony of Boer refugees, called Colonia Escalante, in Chubut.

In 1923 he suffered a cerebral haemorrhage depriving him of the use of various bodily functions. His last years were spent with his family in Casablanca, French Morocco, where he died on 21 January 1940 and where his remains lay buried.

== See also ==
- Italian Volunteer Legion
