= 1899 in the United States =

- Decades: 1870s; 1880s; 1890s; 1900s; 1910s
- See also: History of the United States (1865–1918); Timeline of United States history (1860–1899); List of years in the United States

This article is intended to provide an overview of notable events from the year 1899 in the United States.

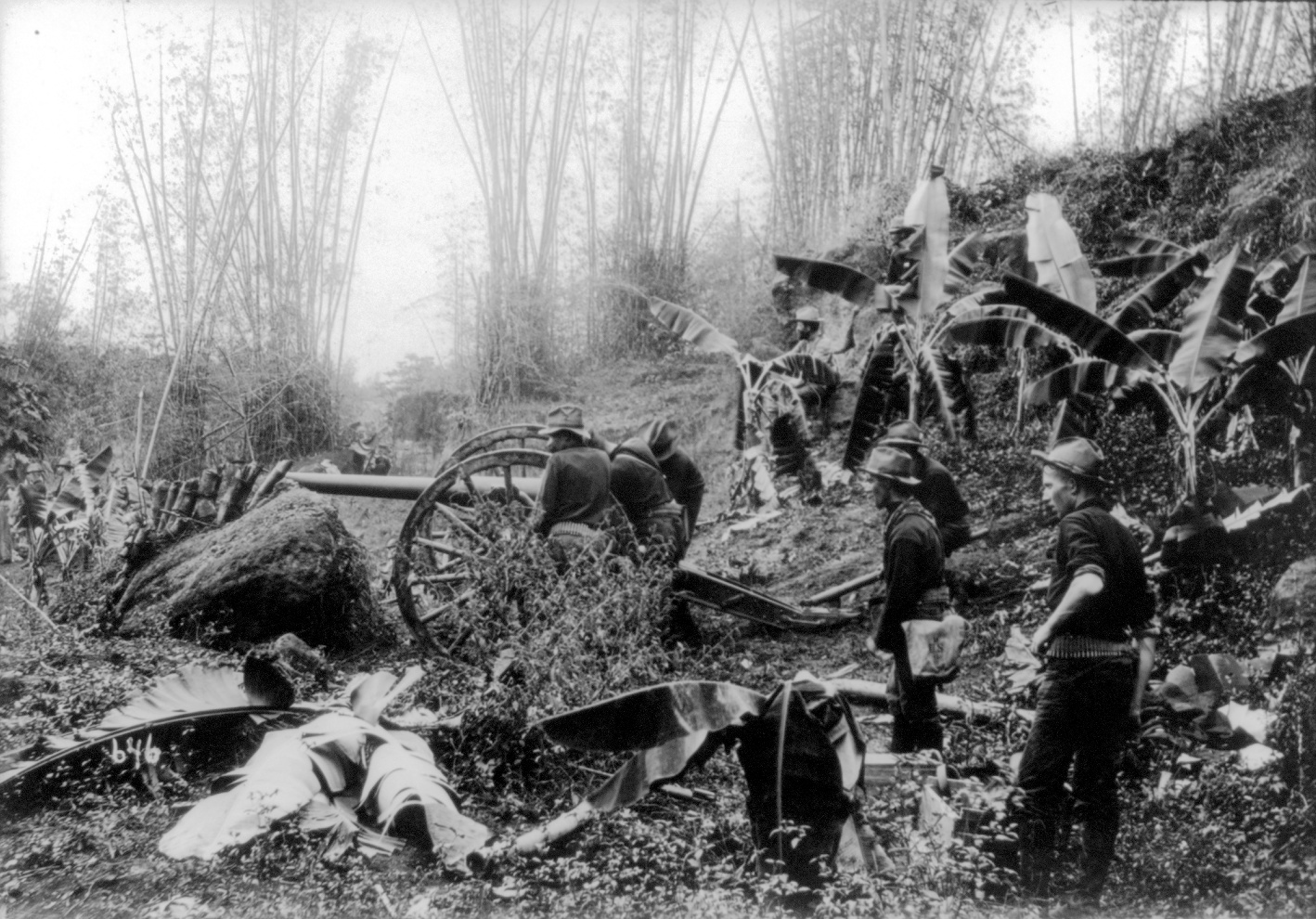
The Battle of Manila of the Filipino-American War, which was a major conflict in 1899 for the United States

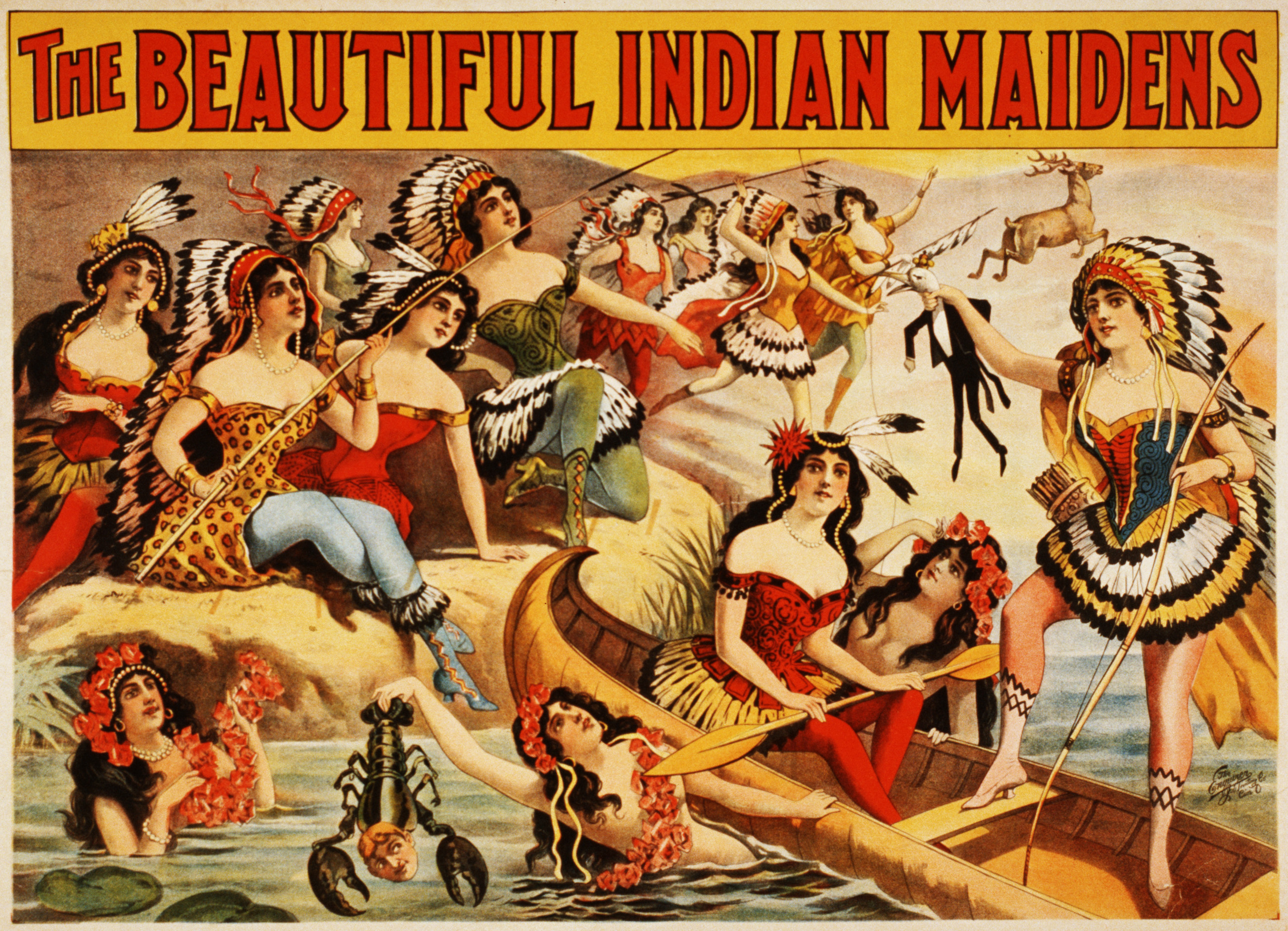
"The beautiful Indian maidens", promotional poster, c. 1899

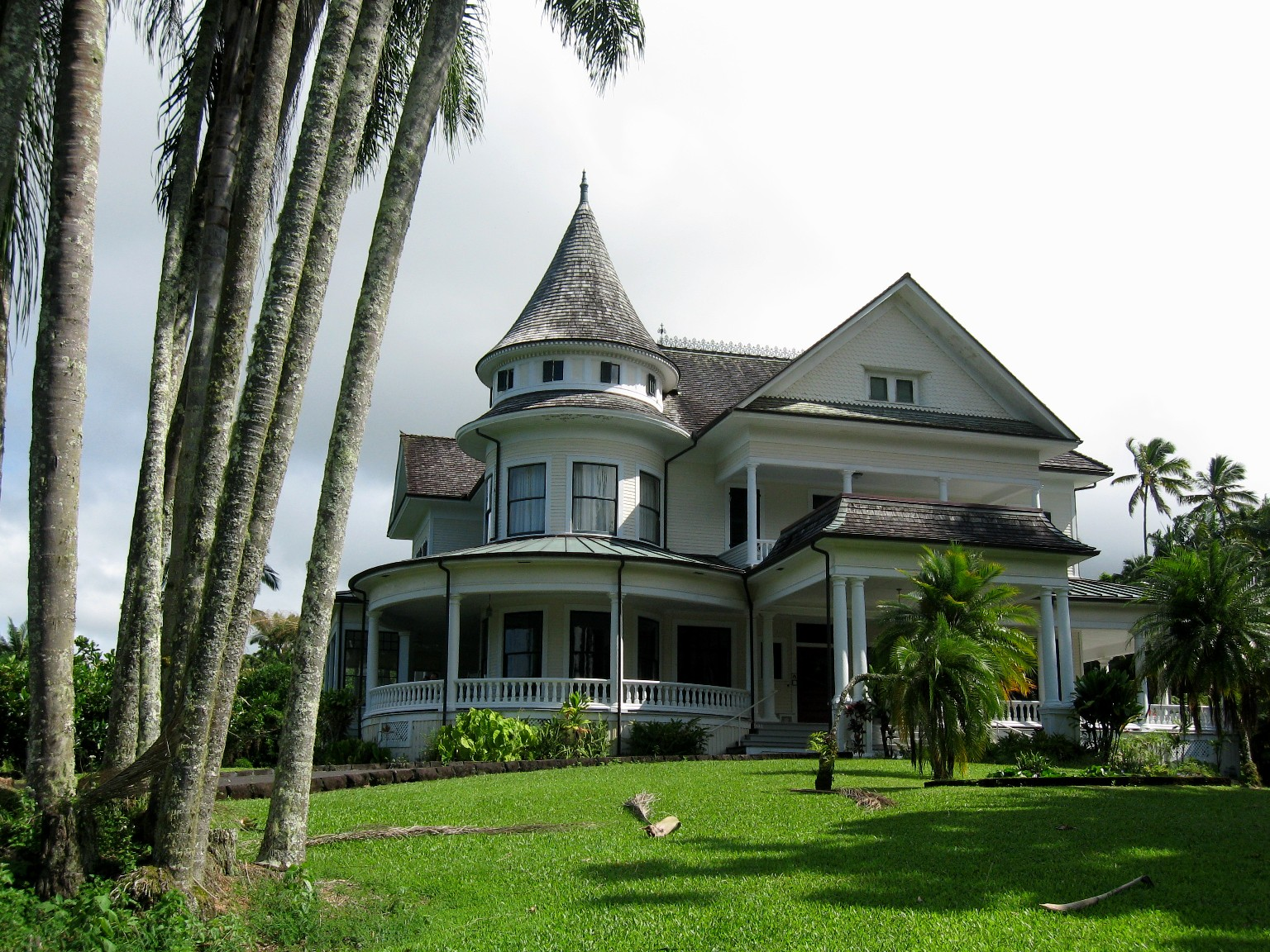
W. H. Shipman House, Hilo, Hawaii, built in 1899

== Incumbents ==
=== Federal government ===
- President: William McKinley (R-Ohio)
- Vice President:

Garret Hobart (R-New Jersey) (until November 21)
vacant (starting November 21)

- Chief Justice: Melville Fuller (Illinois)
- Speaker of the House of Representatives:

Thomas Brackett Reed (R-Maine) (until March 4)
David B. Henderson (R-Iowa) (starting December 4)

- Congress: 55th (until March 4), 56th (starting March 4)

==== State governments ====
Governors and lieutenant governors

=== Governors ===
- Governor of Alabama: Joseph F. Johnston (Democratic)
- Governor of Arkansas: Daniel Webster Jones (Democratic)
- Governor of California: James Budd (Democratic) (until January 4), Henry Gage (Republican) (starting January 4)
- Governor of Colorado: Alva Adams (Democratic) (until January 10), Charles Spalding Thomas (Democratic) (starting January 10)
- Governor of Connecticut: Lorrin A. Cooke (Republican) (until January 4), George E. Lounsbury (Republican) (starting January 4)
- Governor of Delaware: Ebe W. Tunnell (Democratic)
- Governor of Florida: William D. Bloxham (Democratic)
- Governor of Georgia: Allen D. Candler (Democratic)
- Governor of Idaho: Frank Steunenberg (Democratic)
- Governor of Illinois: John Riley Tanner (Republican)
- Governor of Indiana: James A. Mount (Republican)
- Governor of Iowa: Leslie M. Shaw (Republican)
- Governor of Kansas: John W. Leedy (Populist) (until January 9), William E. Stanley (Republican) (starting January 9)
- Governor of Kentucky: William O. Bradley (Republican) (until December 12), William S. Taylor (Republican) (starting December 12)
- Governor of Louisiana: Murphy James Foster, Sr. (Democratic)
- Governor of Maine: Llewellyn Powers (Republican)
- Governor of Maryland: Lloyd Lowndes, Jr. (Republican)
- Governor of Massachusetts: Roger Wolcott (Republican)
- Governor of Michigan: Hazen S. Pingree (Republican)
- Governor of Minnesota: David M. Clough (Republican) (until January 2), John Lind (Democratic) (starting January 2)
- Governor of Mississippi: Anselm J. McLaurin (Democratic)
- Governor of Missouri: Lon Vest Stephens (Democratic)
- Governor of Montana: Robert Burns Smith (Democratic)
- Governor of Nebraska: Silas A. Holcomb (Democratic) (until January 5), William A. Poynter (Democratic) (starting January 5)
- Governor of Nevada: Reinhold Sadler (Silver)
- Governor of New Hampshire: George A. Ramsdell (Republican) (until January 5), Frank W. Rollins (Republican) (starting January 5)
- Governor of New Jersey: David Ogden Watkins (Republican) (until January 17), Foster MacGowan Voorhees (Republican) (starting January 17)
- Governor of New York: Theodore Roosevelt (Republican) (starting January 1)
- Governor of North Carolina: Daniel Lindsay Russell (Republican)
- Governor of North Dakota: Joseph M. Devine (Republican) (until January 3), Frederick B. Fancher (Republican) (starting January 3)
- Governor of Ohio: Asa S. Bushnell (Republican)
- Governor of Oregon: William Paine Lord (Republican) (until January 9), T. T. Geer (Republican) (starting January 9)
- Governor of Pennsylvania: Daniel H. Hastings (Republican) (until January 17), William A. Stone (Republican) (starting January 17)
- Governor of Rhode Island: Elisha Dyer, Jr. (Republican)
- Governor of South Carolina: William Haselden Ellerbe (Democratic) (until June 2), Miles Benjamin McSweeney (Democratic) (starting June 2)
- Governor of South Dakota: Andrew E. Lee (Populist)
- Governor of Tennessee: Robert Love Taylor (Democratic) (until January 16), Benton McMillin (Democratic) (starting January 16)
- Governor of Texas: Charles A. Culberson (Democratic) (until January 17), Joseph D. Sayers (Democratic) (starting January 17)
- Governor of Utah: Heber Manning Wells (Republican)
- Governor of Vermont: Edward Curtis Smith (Republican)
- Governor of Virginia: James Hoge Tyler (Democratic)
- Governor of Washington: John Rankin Rogers (Populist)/(Democratic)
- Governor of West Virginia: George W. Atkinson (Republican)
- Governor of Wisconsin: Edward Scofield (Republican)
- Governor of Wyoming: William A. Richards (Republican) (until January 2), DeForest Richards (Republican) (starting January 2)

=== Lieutenant governors ===
- Lieutenant Governor of California: William T. Jeter (Democratic) (until January 3), Jacob H. Neff (Republican) (starting January 3)
- Lieutenant Governor of Colorado: Jared L. Brush (Republican) (until January 10), Francis Patrick Carney (Populist) (starting January 10)
- Lieutenant Governor of Connecticut: James D. Dewell (Republican) (until January 4), Lyman A. Mills (Republican) (starting January 4)
- Lieutenant Governor of Idaho: George F. Moore (Democratic) (until January 2), J. H. Hutchinson (Democratic) (starting January 2)
- Lieutenant Governor of Illinois: William Northcott (Republican)
- Lieutenant Governor of Indiana: William S. Haggard (Republican)
- Lieutenant Governor of Iowa: James C. Milliman (Republican)
- Lieutenant Governor of Kansas: Alexander M. Harvey (Populist) (until January 9), Harry E. Richter (Republican) (starting January 9)
- Lieutenant Governor of Kentucky: William Jackson Worthington (Republican) (until December 12), John Marshall (Republican) (starting December 12)
- Lieutenant Governor of Louisiana: Robert H. Snyder (Democratic)
- Lieutenant Governor of Massachusetts: Winthrop M. Crane (political party unknown)
- Lieutenant Governor of Michigan: Thomas B. Dunstan (Republican) (until month and day unknown), Orrin W. Robinson (Republican) (starting month and day unknown)
- Lieutenant Governor of Minnesota: John L. Gibbs (Republican) (until January 3), Lyndon A. Smith (Republican) (starting January 3)
- Lieutenant Governor of Mississippi: J. H. Jones (Democratic)
- Lieutenant Governor of Missouri: August Bolte (Democratic)
- Lieutenant Governor of Montana: Archibald E. Spriggs (political party unknown)
- Lieutenant Governor of Nebraska: James E. Harris (Democratic) (until January 5), Edward A. Gilbert (Republican) (starting January 5)
- Lieutenant Governor of Nevada: James R. Judge (political party unknown) (starting month and day unknown)
- Lieutenant Governor of New York: Timothy L. Woodruff (Republican)
- Lieutenant Governor of North Carolina: Charles A. Reynolds (Republican)
- Lieutenant Governor of North Dakota: vacant
- Lieutenant Governor of Ohio: Asa W. Jones (Republican)
- Lieutenant Governor of Pennsylvania: Walter Lyon (Republican) (until January 17), John P. S. Gobin (Republican) (starting January 17)
- Lieutenant Governor of Rhode Island: William Gregory (Republican)
- Lieutenant Governor of South Carolina: Miles Benjamin McSweeney (Democratic) (until June 2), Robert B. Scarborough (Democratic) (starting June 2)
- Lieutenant Governor of South Dakota: Daniel T. Hindman (Republican) (until month and day unknown), John T. Kean (Republican) (starting month and day unknown)
- Lieutenant Governor of Tennessee: John Thompson (Democratic) (until month and day unknown), Seid Waddell (Democratic) (starting month and day unknown)
- Lieutenant Governor of Texas: George Taylor Jester (Democratic) (until January 17), James Browning (Democratic) (starting January 17)
- Lieutenant Governor of Vermont: Henry C. Bates (Republican)
- Lieutenant Governor of Virginia: Edward Echols (Democratic)
- Lieutenant Governor of Washington: Thurston Daniels (Populist)
- Lieutenant Governor of Wisconsin: Emil Baensch (Republican) (until January 2), Jesse Stone (Republican) (starting January 2)

== Events ==
=== January ===
- January 1 – Queens and Staten Island merge with New York City.
- January 4 – The American Society of Landscape Architects, still in existence 127 years later, is founded.
- January 9 – George F. Hoar, a U.S. Senator for Massachusetts, speaks out in the Senate against American expansion into the Philippines. The text of Hoar's speech is sent by cable to Hong Kong at a cost of $4,000 and is later cited by Ambassador John Barrett on January 13, 1900, as an incitement to Filipino attacks on U.S. troops.
- January 10 – The Tau Kappa Epsilon fraternity is founded at Illinois Wesleyan University in Bloomington, Illinois.
- January 11 – The Steel Plate Transferrers' Association, the first labor union for workers skilled in siderography (the engraving and mass reproduction of steel plates for newspaper printing) is established. After changing its name to the International Association of Siderographers, it will have 80 members at its peak. It dissolves in 1991, with only eight members left.
- January 15 – The name of Puerto Rico is changed by the new U.S. military government to "Porto Rico". It will not be changed back until May 17, 1932.
- January 17 – The United States takes possession of Wake Island.
- January 18 – The General Assembly of the U.S. state of Pennsylvania begins the task of filling the U.S. Senate seat of Matthew Quay, who resigned after being indicted on criminal charges. After 79 ballots and three months, no candidate has a majority, and the General Assembly refuses to approve the governor's appointment of a successor, so the seat remains vacant for more than two years. The Pennsylvania experience later leads to the Seventeenth Amendment to the United States Constitution to provide for U.S. Senators to be directly elected by popular vote, rather than by the state legislatures.
- January 19 – Future film producer Samuel Goldwyn, born in Poland and later a resident of Germany and England, arrives in the United States at the age of sixteen as Szmuel Gelbfisz.
- January 20 – The Schurman Commission is created by President William McKinley to study the American approach to the sovereignty of the Philippines, ceded to the U.S. on December 10 by Spain. The five-man group, chaired by Cornell University President Jacob Schurman, later concludes that the Philippines will need to become financially independent before a republic can be created.
- January 25 – The city of Ponce, Puerto Rico is saved from disaster by seven firemen and one volunteer civilian who disobey orders and stop "El Polvorin", a fire near the U.S. Army's store of explosive artillery. A "Monument to the Heroes of El Polvorín" is later erected in their honor.
- January 26 – U.S. Representative George Henry White of North Carolina, the only African-American in Congress at this time, delivers his first major speech, speaking out against disenfranchisement of black voters and proposing that the number of representatives from a U.S. state should be based on the number of persons of voting age who actually cast ballots, rather than population.
- January 28 – At a time when U.S. Senators are elected by the state legislature rather than by ballot, wealthy businessman William A. Clark is elected senator by the Montana state legislature after offering bribes to most of its members. The U.S. Senate refuses to seat him after evidence of the bribery is revealed.
- January 29 – A lawyer for the estate of John W. Keely, an inventor who had persuaded investors in his Keely Motor Company that an automobile could be created that would operate from Keely's "induction resonance motion motor" which had achieved perpetual motion, reveals that the late Mr. Keely's motor has been a fraud, and that the widow knew nothing of it.
- January 31 – Cherokee Nation voters in the Indian Territory (later the U.S. state of Oklahoma) approve a proposition to allot Cherokee lands and to dissolve the Cherokee government, but the U.S. Congress never ratifies the results.

=== February ===
- February 3 – Kansas University's new college basketball team, coached by the game's inventor, Dr. James Naismith, plays its first game, and is defeated by the YMCA team of Kansas City, Kansas, 16 to 5.
- February 4 – The Philippine–American War begins as hostilities break out in Manila.
- February 6 – Spanish–American War: A peace treaty between the United States and Spain is ratified by the United States Senate.
- February 9 – The Dodge Commission exonerates the U.S. Department of War from responsibility in the United States Army beef scandal. While War Secretary Russell Alger is not accused of criminal negligence, the Commission implies that he was incompetent and he is later forced to resign.
- February 10
  - Spanish–American War: The U.S. receives the Philippines, Guam, and Puerto Rico as a result of the Treaty of Paris.
  - Future U.S. President Herbert Hoover and his fiancée Lou Henry, both 24, are married at her parents' home in Monterey, California, and depart the next day for a 14-month stay in China, where Hoover works as a mining engineer.
- February 11 – The coldest temperature recorded up to this time in the continental United States is set as Fort Logan, Montana, records a low of −61 °F (−52 °C).
- February 12–14 – Great Blizzard of 1899: Freezing temperatures and snow extend well south into North America, including southern Florida. It is the latest in a series of disasters to Florida's citrus industry.
- February 13 – In New York, the White Star ocean liner SS Germanic, already laden with ice and snow during its voyage from Liverpool, becomes even more weighed down after disembarking its passengers when the New York City blizzard strikes. With 3,600,000 pounds (1,600,000 kg) of added weight, the ship begins to list sideways and additional weight enters cargo doors that have been opened for refuelling. Germanic remains on the bottom of New York Harbor for more than a week while salvaging goes on, then requires refurbishing for three months, but becomes operational again.
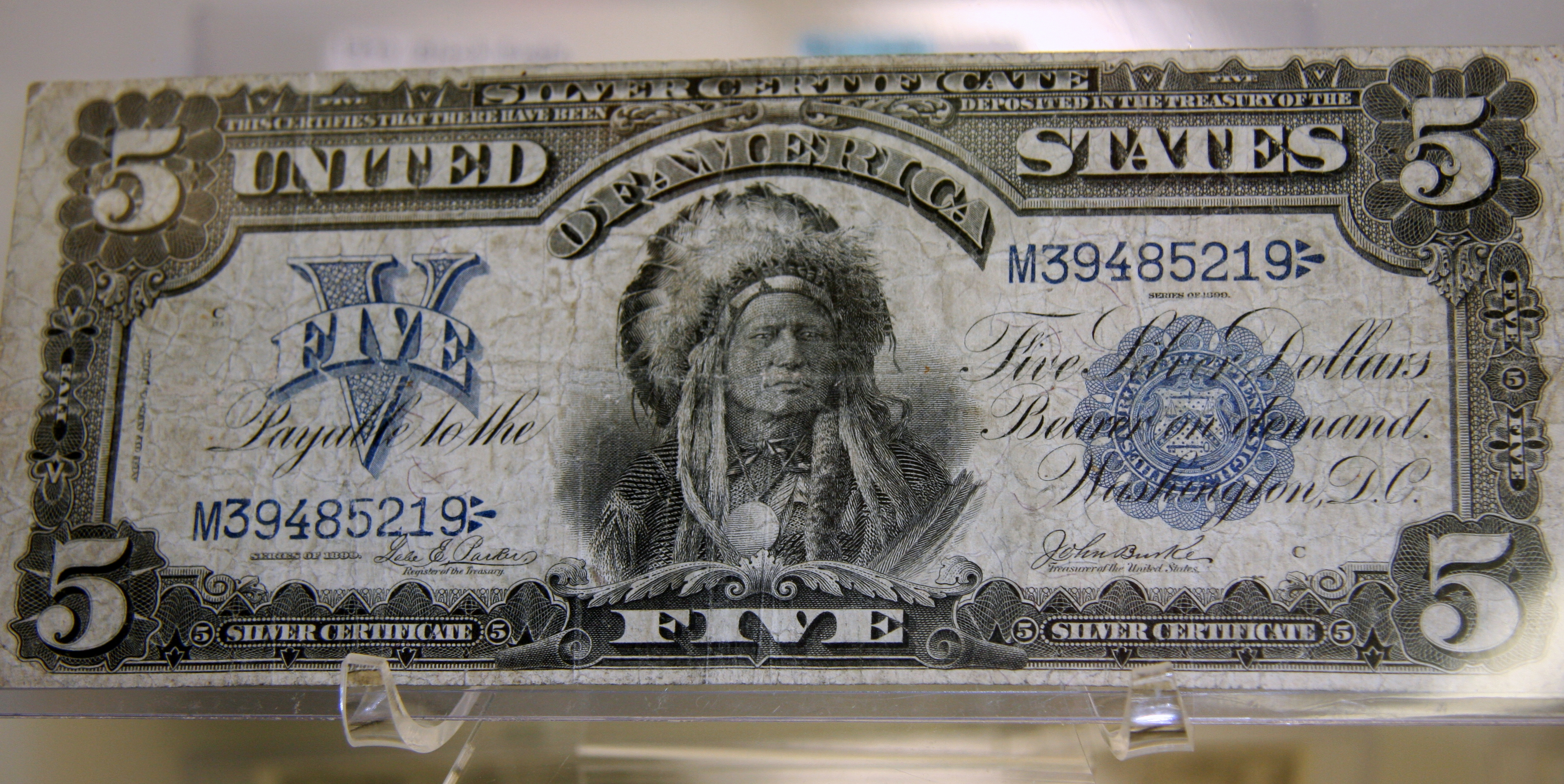
  1899 $5 silver certificate
- February 14 – Voting machines are approved by the U.S. Congress for use in federal elections.
- February 22 – Convention Hall, which later hosts two national political conventions, opens in Kansas City, Missouri, with a concert by the band of John Philip Sousa. The building burns down less than 14 months later.
- February 28 – U.S. President William McKinley approves a law increasing the pension to American Civil War veterans, both Union and Confederate, to $25.00 per month.

=== March ===
- March 2 – In Washington state, Mount Rainier National Park is established.
- March 5 – George B. Selden sells the rights to his patent for an internal combustion engine to the Electric Vehicle Company, and he and the company then claim a royalty on all automobiles using such an engine.
- March 10 – The U.S. state of Delaware enacts its general corporation act that makes it the most important jurisdiction in United States corporate law.
- March 12 – Encinal County, Texas, created on February 1, 1856, near the U.S. city of Laredo on the condition that it would create a county seat, is discontinued and annexed into neighboring Webb County. The largest town in the area, Bruni, has less than 400 people.
- March 13 – Chelan County, Washington is created from Okanogan and Kittitas counties for the area around Wenatchee.
- March 15 – Santa Cruz County is established in the southeast corner of Pima County around the city of Nogales in the U.S. territory of Arizona.
- March 24 – George Dewey is made Admiral of the Navy.

=== April ===
- April 6 – In an elaborate military ceremony, 336 American soldiers killed in the Spanish–American War are interred at the Arlington National Cemetery.
- April 8 – The Victors, the fight song for University of Michigan sports, is premiered at Ann Arbor, Michigan by John Philip Sousa and his band. A student orchestra had played the music three days earlier for a smaller student audience.
- April 13 – Tahoe National Forest is established in California.
- April 15 – Students at the University of California, Berkeley steal the Stanford Axe from Stanford University yell leaders following a baseball game, thus establishing the Axe as a symbol of the rivalry between the schools.

=== May ===
- May 1 – U.S. Navy Admiral George Dewey reports that 10 officers and crew of the ship USS Yorktown have been taken prisoner by the Philippine republic.
- May 4 – The thoroughbred horse Manuel, ridden by Fred Taral, wins the 25th running of the Kentucky Derby.
- May 15 – A clue to the fate of the British freighter Pelican, which disappeared in October 1897 along with 40 crew, is found in a message in a bottle that washes ashore at Portage Bay, Alaska.
- May 20 – Jacob German, a cab driver, becomes the first motor vehicle operator in the U.S. to be arrested for speeding when he is caught driving his electric taxi 12 miles per hour (19 km/h), more than twice the speed limit on Lexington Avenue.
- May 30 – Female outlaw Pearl Hart robs a stage coach 30 miles (48 km) southeast of Globe, Arizona.
- May 31 – The launch of the Harriman Alaska Expedition.

=== June ===
- June 7
  - Temperance movement crusader Carrie Nation enters a saloon in Kiowa, Kansas, and proceeds to destroy all the alcoholic beverages with rocks.
  - The Automobile Club of America is founded by a group of racers attending a meeting at the Waldorf-Astoria Hotel in New York City.
- June 8 – The Frederick Douglass Monument, the first statue in the U.S. to memorialize a specific African-American person, in unveiled in Douglass' hometown of Rochester, New York.
- June 12 – New Richmond Tornado: A tornado completely destroys the town of New Richmond, Wisconsin, killing 117 people and injuring more than 200.
- June 14 – Hiram M. Hiller Jr., William Henry Furness III and Alfred Craven Harrison Jr. set off on their third research expedition to gather archeological, cultural, zoological, and botanical specimens for museums, with a focus on South Asia and Australia.
- June 16 – The United States and Barbados sign a trade treaty.
- June 23 – William H. Thompkins, Dennis Bell, Fitz Lee and George H. Wanton are awarded the Medal of Honor for their heroism in the Spanish–American War. The four men become the last African-Americans to be selected for the Medal of Honor for more than half a century.
  - The Kingdom of Siam (modern-day Thailand) and the Russian Empire sign a Declaration of Jurisdiction, Trade and Navigation at Bangkok.
- June 25 – Three Denver, Colorado newspapers publish a story (later proved to be a fabrication) that the Chinese government under the Guangxu Emperor is going to demolish the Great Wall of China.
- June 29 – The mayor of Muskegon, Michigan, James Balbirnie, is assassinated by a disappointed office-seeker, J. W. Tayer, who then kills himself.
- June 30 – Mile-a-Minute Murphy earns his famous nickname this day, after he becomes the first man to ride a bicycle for one mile in under a minute on Long Island.

=== July ===
- July 10 – The Allegan meteorite, a 50 lb (23 kg) H chondrite crashes to Earth and lands in southwestern Michigan's Allegan County.
- July 17 – America's first juvenile court is established in Chicago.
- July 19
  - U.S. Secretary of War Russell A. Alger submits his resignation at the request of U.S. President McKinley, following public outrage over the United States Army beef scandal.
  - The Newsboys Strike takes place when the Newsies of New York City go on strike (strike lasts until August 2).
- July 20 – A white lynch mob in Tallulah, Louisiana kills five white Italian shopkeepers from Sicily who have opened stores in the town to sell produce and meat, after accusations that the Sicilians were driving the American stores out of business. None of the suspects in the lynching are prosecuted.
- July 22 – The torture and lynching of Frank Embree takes place in Fayette, Missouri, after Embree, a black 19-year-old man, is accused by a mob of raping a white 14-year-old girl. Shortly after Embree has received 100 lashes from a whip, a photographer takes Embree's photo, followed by another one after Embree's hanging.
- July 23 – Washington, D.C. retires its short-lived cable car system, the day after Columbia Railway Company converts exclusively to electric powered cars
- July 27 – Gold is discovered in Nome, Alaska, leading to the Nome Gold Rush.
- July 30 – The Harriman Alaska Expedition ends successfully.

=== August ===
- August 1 – A hurricane destroys all but nine homes in the town of Carrabelle, Florida
- August 2 – The first attack on an offshore oil installation in the United States takes place near Montecito, when a mob of outraged citizens demolishes an oil rig.
- August 3 – The John Marshall Law School is founded in Chicago, Illinois.
- August 10 – Major Taylor wins the world 1-mile professional cycling championship in Montreal, securing his place as the first African American world champion in any sport.
- August 11 – The "Black Heavyweight Championship" of boxing is won by Frank Childs, defeating Klondike Haynes.
- August 16
  - Hobson City, Alabama, the oldest exclusively African American municipality in the United States, is incorporated in Calhoun County.
  - Western outlaw Tom "Black Jack" Ketchum is badly wounded in an attempt to commit a train robbery. He is captured the next day, has an arm amputated, and is executed by hanging in 1901.
- August 17 – A hurricane makes landfall in North Carolina's Outer Banks, completely destroying the town of Diamond City.
- August 18 – Rasmus Midgett of the United States Life-Saving Service single-handedly saves the 10 surviving crew of the freighter SS Priscilla
- August 22 – The earliest major motorcycle race in the U.S. takes place at the Harford Avenue Colosseum in Baltimore, Maryland. The team of Henri Fournier and Charles Henshaw wins the race.
- August 23 – In Darien, Georgia, the "Delegal riot" takes place when hundreds of armed African-American residents surround the McIntosh County Jail to prevent the transfer of Henry Delegal, a black man charged with rape, to prevent the possibility of Delegal being lynched. The Georgia State militia is sent in to disband the rioters and to oversee Delegal's safe transfer. Delegal is later acquitted of the rape charge.
- August 25 – Two convicted murderers, Cyrus A. Brown and Matthew Craig, become the first white men to be legally executed in the modern-day U.S. state of Oklahoma. The two are hanged together at Muskogee.

=== September ===
- September 3 – An 8.2 magnitude earthquake shakes the area around Yakutat Bay in Alaska.
- September 4 – Thomas B. Reed, Speaker of the U.S. House of Representatives, resigns his seat in Congress and the Speaker's office in protest over U.S. President McKinley's support of war with Spain.
- September 6 – Open Door Policy is a term in foreign affairs initially used to refer to the United States policy established in the late-nineteenth century and the early-twentieth century, as enunciated in Secretary of State John Hay's Open Door Note,
- September 7 – The first parade of automobiles in the U.S. takes place at Newport, Rhode Island.
- September 10 – A week after an 8.2 magnitude quake strikes Alaska, a stronger, 8.5 magnitude earthquake shakes Yakutat Bay.
- September 14 – Henry H. Bliss becomes the first person to be killed by a motor vehicle in the United States. Upon disembarking from a streetcar in New York City, an electric-powered taxicab strikes and crushes him and he dies from his injuries the following morning.
- September 18 – Scott Joplin's Maple Leaf Rag is registered for copyright.
- September 27 – Former U.S. President Benjamin Harrison concludes his special assignment of arguing in favor of Britain before the Anglo-Venezuelan arbitration tribunal.
- September 30 – In Milwaukee, minor league baseball executive Harry Quinn announces an 8-team rival to baseball's 12-team National League, the "American Baseball Association" with an eastern division (New York, Philadelphia, Baltimore and Washington) and a western division (Chicago, St. Louis, Milwaukee and Detroit).

=== October ===
- October 7 – U.S. President William McKinley, Canada's Prime Minister Wilfrid Laurier and Mexico's Foreign Minister Ignacio Mariscal are hosted in Chicago for its Autumn Festival.

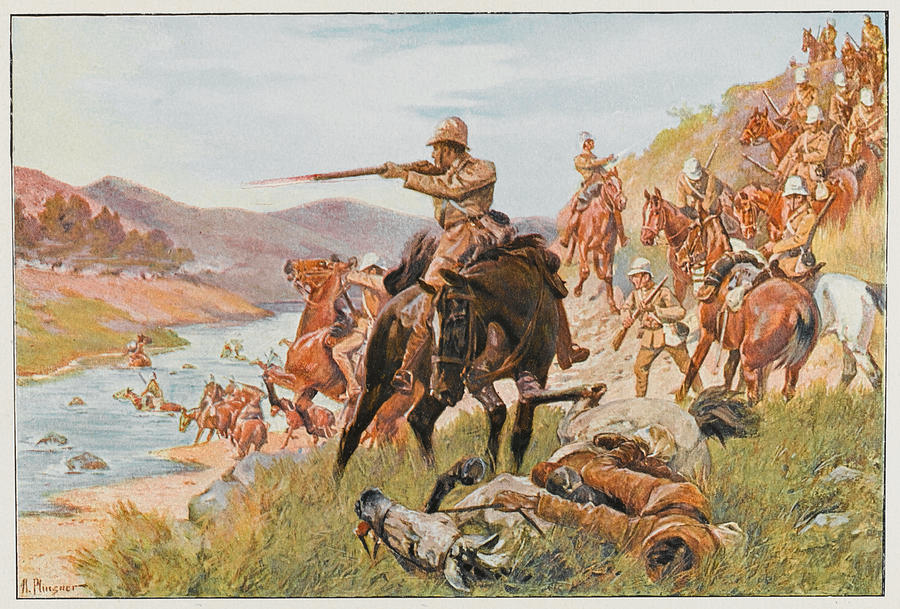
American Volunteers at the Battle of Modder River

- October 11 - A delegation of Irish politicians leave Ireland via steamship for New York City to conduct a two-month fundraising tour of the north-eastern United States to raise funds to construct a monument to Charles Stewart Parnell in Dublin. The group are received by many prominent figures during the tour, including President McKinley, and then-Governor Roosevelt. The committee later commission eminent Irish-American sculptor Augustus Saint-Gaudens to design the monument.
- October 12 - The Second Boer War starts, leading to American volunteers signing up for both sides of the conflict.
- October 30 – The Augusta High School Building is completed in Augusta, Kentucky; Augusta Methodist College shuts down.

=== November ===
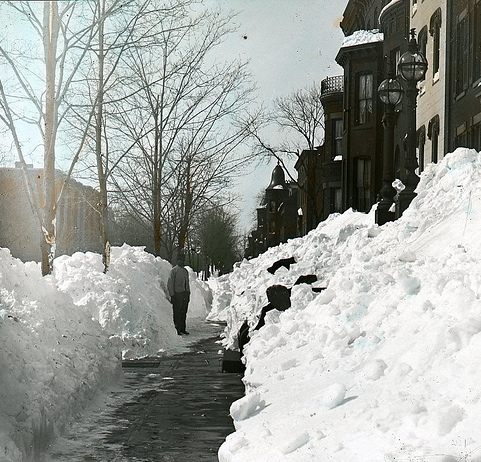
1899 snowstorm in Washington, D.C.

- November 4 – The Alpha Sigma Tau sorority is founded in Ypsilanti, Michigan.
- November 6
  - The first Packard luxury automobile is produced.
  - The first Broadway play based on Sherlock Holmes debuts at the Garrick Theater.
- November 8 – The Bronx Zoo opens in New York City.
- November 17 – "Naval Station, Honolulu" is established by the Department of the Navy in the recently annexed Territory of Hawaii. The strategic base is later named for its location on Pearl Harbor.
- November 21 – Vice President Garret Hobart dies of heart failure.
- November 22 – Serial killer Martin Stickles kills his first random victim, shooting a former neighbor, William B. Shanklin, then burning down Shanklin's house.
- November 23 – The Department of the Post Office applies the same charges for mail from Puerto Rico, the Philippines and Guam as are used in the other 46 U.S. states.
- November 24 – Eleonora de Cisneros, the first American-trained opera singer in the U.S., makes her debut for the Metropolitan Opera company, appearing as Rossweisse at the Met's production of Wagner's Die Walküre in Chicago.

=== December ===
- December 2 – Philippine–American War – Battle of Tirad Pass: ("The Filipino Thermopylae") General Gregorio del Pilar and his troops are able to guard the retreat of Philippine President Emilio Aguinaldo before being wiped out.
- December 4 – At the first session of the 56th U.S. Congress, David B. Henderson is elected Speaker of the House. The House refuses permission for Brigham H. Roberts to take the oath of office, pending investigation of allegations of bigamy.
- December 6 – A lynch mob in Maysville, Kentucky forces its way into the county jail to seize an African-American indicted for murder, tortures him and then burns him to death.
- December 15 – The Republican National Committee votes to hold its 1900 national convention in Philadelphia, to start on June 19, 1900.
- December 18
  - General Lawton is killed by a Filipino sniper near San Mateo on Luzon island.
  - Stock prices fall drastically at the New York exchanges and the Produce Exchange Trust Company fails.
- December 19 – New York City's clearinghouse banks pool together a $10,000,000 loan fund to prevent further failures of companies.
- December 20 – The U.S. government arrests nine customs officials in Havana on charges of collusion to defraud the government.
- December 21 – Leonard Wood arrives in Havana to become the new Governor-General of Cuba.
- December 25 – The 6.7 M_{w} San Jacinto earthquake shook the Inland Empire area of Southern California with a maximum Mercalli intensity of IX (Violent), causing six deaths and $50,000 in damage.
- December 26 – Pinnacle Rock, a balancing rock in Cumberland Gap on the Tennessee and Kentucky border, falls down.
- December 28 – The bodies of the officers and men killed on the 1898 explosion of the battleship USS Maine are reinterred at the Arlington National Cemetery.

=== Undated ===
- The North Carolina General Assembly incorporates the town of Manteo, which was originally laid out as the Dare county seat in 1870.
- Gold is discovered in Nome, Alaska.
- Public Archives Commission established.

=== Ongoing ===
- Gay Nineties (1890–1899)
- Progressive Era (1890s–1920s)
- Lochner era (c. 1897–c. 1937)
- Philippine–American War (1899–1902)
- Boxer Rebellion (1899–1901) Boxer Rebellion#Allied intervention.2C the Boxer War.2C and the aftermath

== Births ==
- January 9 – John A. Danaher, U.S. Senator from Connecticut 1939–1945 (died 1990).
- January 17 – Al Capone, gangster and crime boss (died 1947).
- February 2 – Herbie Faye, actor (d. 1980).
- February 4 – Virginia M. Alexander, African-American physician. (died 1949)
- February 7 – Earl Whitehill, baseball player (died 1954).
- February 22
  - Dwight Frye, actor (died 1943).
  - George O'Hara, silent film actor and screenwriter (died 1966).
- February 27 – Charles Best, medical scientist (died 1978 in Canada).
- March 4 – Harry R. Wellman, academic (died 1997).
- March 10 – Maxwell Maltz, cosmetic surgeon, author of Psycho-Cybernetics (died 1975).
- March 27 – Gloria Swanson, actress (died 1983).
- March 29 – James V. Allred, politician, 33rd Governor of Texas (died 1959).
- April 8 – Edward D. Crippa, politician, senator from Wyoming (died 1960).
- April 11 – Percy Lavon Julian, African American research chemist (died 1975).
- April 28 – Mary Loveless, née Hewitt, immunologist (died 1991).
- April 27-Walter Lantz, animator and director (died 1994).
- April 29
  - Duke Ellington, jazz musician and composer (died 1974).
  - Mary Petty, illustrator (died 1976).
- May 8 –Arthur Q. Bryan, actor, comedian and radio personality (died 1959)
- May 10 – Fred Astaire, né Austerlitz, dancer and singer (died 1987).
- May 15 – Len Jordan, U.S. Senator from Idaho 1962–1973 (died 1983).
- May 23 – Jeralean Talley, supercentenarian (died 2015)
- June 4 – Arthur Barker, son of Ma Barker and a member of the Barker-Karpis gang (died 1939).
- June 26 – Odus Mitchell, American football player and coach (died 1989).
- June 30 – Harry Shields, jazz clarinettist (died 1971).
- July 6 – Susannah Mushatt Jones, African American supercentenarian, oldest (confirmed) living person 2015–2016 (died 2016).
- July 7
  - Anna Baetjer, toxicologist (died 1984).
  - Claude P. Dettloff, photographer (died 1978 in Canada).
- July 11 – Frank R. Walker, admiral (died 1976).
- July 17 – James Cagney, film actor (died 1986).
- July 18 – Floyd Stahl, collegiate athletic coach (died 1996)
- July 20 – Paul Christoph Mangelsdorf, botanist and agronomist (died 1989)
- July 21
  - Hart Crane, poet (died 1932).
  - Ernest Hemingway, fiction writer and journalist (died 1961).
- July 23 – Carl G. Fenner, botanist (died 1991).
- July 29 – Walter Beall, baseball player (died 1959)
- August 17 – Janet Lewis, novelist and poet (died 1998)
- August 28 – Vernon Huber, rear admiral; 36th Governor of American Samoa (died 1967)
- August 30 – Ray Arcel, boxing trainer (died 1994).
- September 9
  - Neil Hamilton, actor (died 1984).
  - Waite Hoyt, baseball player (died 1984).
- September 11 – Jimmie Davis, country and gospel singer-songwriter and politician (died 2000).
- October 3 – Gertrude Berg, actress, screenwriter and producer (died 1966).
- October 24 – Burr Shafer, cartoonist (died 1965).
- November 5
  - Margaret Atwood Judson, historian and author (died 1991).
  - Forrest Lewis, actor (died 1977).
- November 21 – Jobyna Ralston, actress (died 1967)
- November 22 – Hoagy Carmichael, composer and singer (died 1981).
- November 26 – Mona Bruns, actress (died 2000).
- December 2 – Ray Morehart, baseball player (died 1989).
- December 6 – Sam Newfield, film director (died 1964).
- December 20 – John Sparkman, U.S. Senator from Alabama 1946–1979 (died 1985).
- December 25 – Humphrey Bogart, film actor (died 1957).
- Caroline F. Ware, historian and New Deal activist (died 1990).

== Deaths ==
- January 23 – Daniel O'Connell, journalist, poet and writer (born 1849)
- January 26 – Augustus Hill Garland, U.S. Senator from Arkansas 1885–1889 (born 1832).
- March 1 – Philip W. McKinney, 41st Governor of Virginia (born 1832).
- March 18 – Othniel Charles Marsh, paleontologist (born 1831).
- March 19 – Patrick Walsh, Irish-born U.S. Senator from Georgia 1894–1895 (born 1840).
- April 10 – Horace Tabor, U.S. Senator from Colorado in 1883 (born 1830).
- April 22 – Meriwether Lewis Clark Jr., founder of the Kentucky Derby (born 1846)
- April 24 – Richard J. Oglesby, U.S. Senator from Illinois 1873–1878 (born 1824).
- June 7 – Augustin Daly, dramatist and theater manager (born 1838).
- July 18 – Horatio Alger, Jr., Unitarian minister and author (born 1832).
- August 8 – Lucy Pickens, socialite, known during and after her lifetime as the "Queen of the Confederacy" (born 1832)
- August 22 – Caspar Buberl, Bohemian-born sculptor (born 1834).
- September 9 – James B. Eustis, U.S. Senator from Louisiana 1876–1879 and 1885–1891 (born 1834).
- September 12 – Cornelius Vanderbilt II, businessman (born 1843).
- October 4 – Jimmy Logue, Philadelphia based burglar (born 1837).
- October 5 – James Harlan, U.S. Senator from Iowa 1865–1866 (born 1820).
- October 14 – Anna Cabot Quincy Waterston, writer of poems, novels, hymns, and a diary (born 1812).
- October 18 – Gussie Davis, African American songwriter (born 1863).
- October 28 – Ottmar Mergenthaler, German-born inventor (born 1854).
- October 30 – William H. Webb, shipbuilder and philanthropist (born 1816).
- November 21 – Garret Hobart, 24th vice president of the United States from 1897 to 1899 (born 1844).
- November 25 – Robert Lowry, Baptist minister and hymn writer (born 1826).
- December 22 – Dwight L. Moody, preacher and publisher (born 1837).

== See also ==
- List of American films of the 1890s
- Timeline of United States history (1860–1899)
