= John Blake =

John Blake may refer to:

== Arts and entertainment ==
- John Blake Jr. (1947–2014), American jazz violinist
- John Blake (journalist) (born 1948), British journalist and publisher
- John Blake (make-up artist), 1992 Academy Award nominated makeup artist
- John Blake, fictional character in the 2012 film The Dark Knight Rises

== Politics ==
- John Blake (Leicester MP) in 1340 represented Leicester (UK Parliament constituency)
- John Blake (Winchester MP), MP for Winchester
- John Blake (MP for Calne), MP for Calne in 1415
- John Blake fitz William, mayor of Galway in 1487–88
- John Blake Jr. (politician) (1762–1826), United States Representative from New York
- John Aloysius Blake (1826–1887), British politician, Member of Parliament
- John L. Blake (1831–1899), United States Representative from New Jersey
- John Blake (Pennsylvania politician) (born 1960), Member of the Pennsylvania State Senate

== Sports ==
- J. P. Blake (John Percy Blake, 1874–1950), British Olympic fencer
- Jere Blake (John Blake, 1875–1933), Wales rugby player
- Bandsman Jack Blake (1890–1960), British boxer born John Blake
- John Blake (cricketer) (1917–1944), English cricketer
- John Blake (rugby union) (1933–1982), Bristol rugby player and teacher
- John Blake (hurler) (born 1957), Irish retired hurler
- John Blake (American football) (1961–2020), American football coach
- John Vaughn Blake (1888–1964), American football player and FBI agent
- John F. Blake (coach), American baseball player and coach

== Others ==
- John Blake (soldier) (1856–1907), Irish-American soldier and adventurer
- John Bradby Blake (1745–1773), British botanist
- John F. Blake (1922–1995), American intelligence official
- John Frederick Blake (1839–1906), British geologist and clergyman
- John Henry Blake (1808–1882), Irish land agent
- John Lauris Blake (1788–1858), American clergyman and author
- John T. Blake (c. 1901–1987), American research scientist
- John Thomas Blake (1853–1940), New Zealand surveyor, interpreter, land agent, historian, racehorse owner and trainer
- John Rennie Blake (1825–1900), faculty chairman in charge of Davidson College, 1871–1877

== See also ==
- John Blake House, 1794 built and 1984 registered historic house in New York, named after John Blake, Jr. (politician)
- Jon Blake (disambiguation)
- John Blake Dillon (1814–1866), Irish writer and politician
