= John MacBride =

Irish republican (1868-1916)

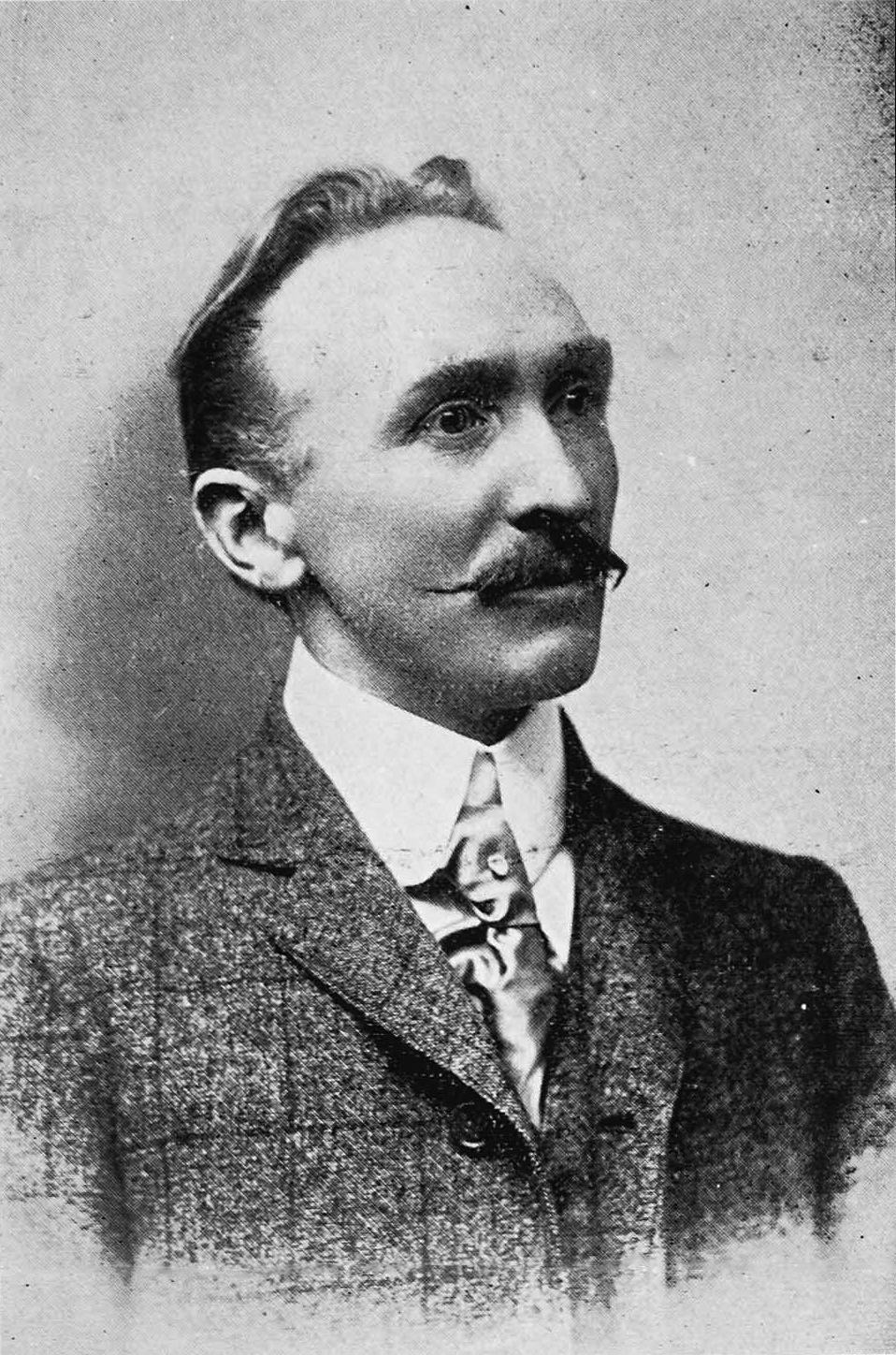
- Circa 1900-1916
- Born: 7 May 1868; Westport, County Mayo, Ireland
- Died: 5 May 1916 (aged 47); Kilmainham Gaol, Dublin, Ireland
- Cause of death: Execution by firing squad
- Spouse: Maud Gonne (m. 1903; sep. 1906)
- Children: Seán MacBride
- Relatives: Joseph MacBride (brother)
- Military career
- Allegiance: South African Republic; Irish Republic
- Branch: Irish Transvaal Brigade
- Service years: 1899–1902 (Boers)
- Rank: Major (Boers)
- Commands: 2i/c, Irish Transvaal Brigade, Boer Army
- Conflicts: Second Boer War; Easter Rising
- Memorials: Drogheda MacBride railway station

John MacBride (sometimes written John McBride; Irish: Seán Mac Giolla Bhríde; 7 May 1868 – 5 May 1916) was an Irish republican and military leader. He was executed by the British government for his participation in the 1916 Easter Rising in Dublin.

== Early life ==
John MacBride was born at The Quay, Westport, County Mayo, Ireland, to Patrick MacBride, a shopkeeper and trader, and the former Honoria Gill, who survived her son. A plaque marks the building on the Westport Quays where he was born (now the Helm Bar and Restaurant). He was educated at the Christian Brothers' School, Westport, and at St. Malachy's College, Belfast. His red hair and long nose led to him being given the nickname "Foxy Jack". He worked for a period in a drapery shop in Castlerea, County Roscommon. He had studied medicine, but gave it up and began working with a chemist's firm in Dublin.

He joined the Irish Republican Brotherhood and was associated with Michael Cusack in the early days of the Gaelic Athletic Association. He also joined the Celtic Literary Society through which he came to know Arthur Griffith who was to remain a friend and influence throughout his life. Beginning in 1893, MacBride was termed a "dangerous nationalist" by the British government. In 1896 he went to the United States on behalf of the IRB. In the same year he returned and emigrated to South Africa.

In 1896 MacBride emigrated to the Transvaal Republic, finding work at the Langlaagte goldmine near Johannesburg. MacBride emerged as leader of the pro-Kruger Irish uitlanders, a group that included Arthur Griffith (who was briefly in the region at the time). In Johannesburg, MacBride staged a major commemoration of the Irish Rebellion of 1798, rivalling a parallel Dublin event and marking the Irish community as distinct within uitlander society.

== Participation in the Second Anglo-Boer War ==
MacBride took part in the Second Boer War on the side of the Boer Republics, for whom he raised the Irish Transvaal Brigade. What became known as MacBride's Brigade was first commanded by an Irish-American, Colonel John Blake, an ex-US Cavalry Officer. MacBride recommended Blake as Commander, since MacBride himself had no military experience. The Brigade was given official recognition by the Republic of Transvaal, and the commissions of the Brigade's officers were signed by State Secretary F.W. Reitz. MacBride was commissioned with the rank of Major in the Boer commandos and given Transvaal citizenship.

The 500 Irish and Irish-Americans fought the British. Often these Irish commandos were fighting opposite Irish regiments, such as the Royal Dublin Fusiliers and the Royal Inniskilling Fusiliers. From the hills around the besieged town of Ladysmith to the plains of the Orange Free State, MacBride's Brigade first looked after the Boers' "Long Tom" gun, then fought in the Battle of Colenso and later held the rearguard, harassing Lord Roberts' cavalry as the Boer Commandos retreated.

A Second Irish Brigade was organised by Arthur Lynch. The arrival in the Irish camp of an Irish-American ambulance corps bolstered MacBride's Brigade. Michael Davitt, who had resigned as an M.P, visited MacBride's Brigade. When Col. Blake was injured at Ladysmith, MacBride had to take sole command of the Brigade. Though Blake later returned for a short period, he later left the Brigade to join another commando. In Ireland pro-Boer feeling, informed by Arthur Griffith and Maud Gonne, formed the most popular and most fervent of the European pro-Boer movements. However, more than 16,000 Irish fought for the British against the Boers.

== Marriage to Maud Gonne ==
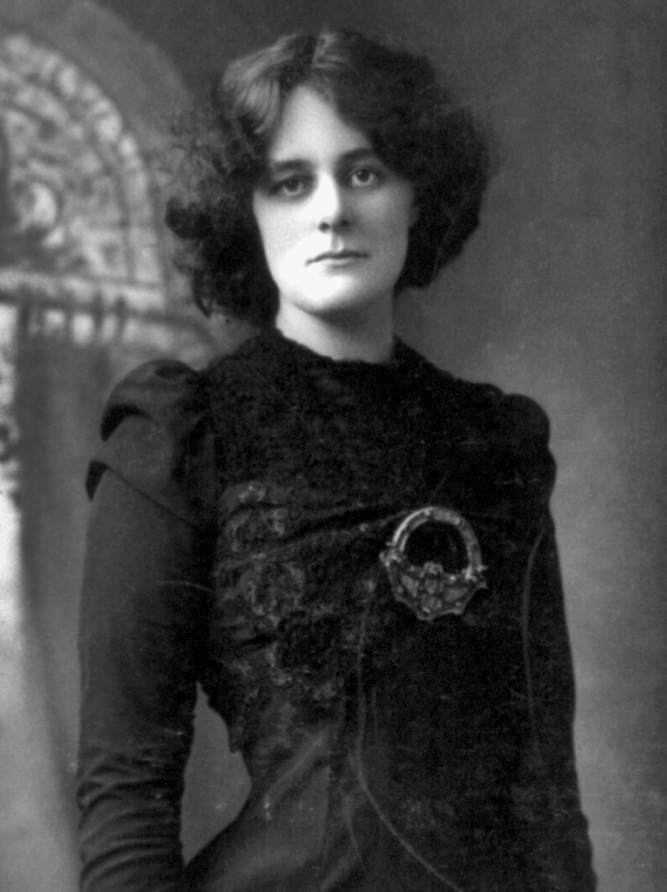
Gonne in 1901, shortly before her marriage to MacBride

When MacBride became a citizen of the Transvaal during the Second Boer War, the British Government regarded him (as a British subject) to have committed high treason by aiding the enemy. After the war, he travelled to Paris, where Maud Gonne was then living. The two first met in the winter of 1900 at the Gare de Lyon, when MacBride arrived from the Transvaal to begin his exile. Both were active in Irish nationalist circles in the French capital, and their shared political commitments brought them together. They toured the United States in 1901 and again in 1902, addressing nationalist gatherings and raising support for the Irish cause.

In February 1903, despite strong opposition from both families and from figures such as W. B. Yeats and Arthur Griffith, Gonne converted to Catholicism on 17 February and married MacBride in Paris four days later. Yeats, who had proposed marriage to her multiple times, pleaded with her not to go through with it. Patrick Little, editor of New Ireland, who had published work by both Yeats and Gonne, recalled an extreme case that almost prevented the marriage:

When John McBride became engaged to Maud Gonne, Stephen McKenna made the remark that he thought that it was a tragedy that such a remarkable woman should get engaged to such a rolling stone. This story was reversed, and repeated to McBride, who challenged Stephen McKenna to fight a duel. Stephen, who was always prepared to oblige anybody, accepted the challenge, and they met in a large room, in the offices of the New York Sun. The weapons were revolvers. Just before they started shooting, Stephen asked McBride what the duel was about, and McBride said that he had been told that Stephen McKenna had said that it was a shame that such an honest man as McBride should marry such a person as Maud Gonne. Stephen said, "Quite the contrary. What I said was, it was a shame that such a turbulent rascal should marry such a splendid woman" And Seán McBride said, "Shake hands, old man!"

Almost immediately, Gonne began to feel the marriage was a mistake. Later writings by MacBride indicate that her bohemian independence conflicted with his expectations of a wife, and he appears to have hoped she would renounce parts of her past. Their growing estrangement was evident in Gonne’s increasing visits to Ireland, where MacBride, still under threat of arrest for his Boer War activities, could not accompany her. The following year, their only child, Seán MacBride, was born.

Yeats wrote to Lady Gregory in January 1905, the month MacBride and Maud separated, that he had been told MacBride had molested his stepdaughter, Iseult, who was 10 at that time. The marriage had already failed but the couple could not agree on custody of Sean. Maud instituted divorce proceedings in Paris. No divorce was given but in a separation agreement, Maud won custody to the baby until age 12. The father got visiting rights and one month each summer. MacBride returned to Dublin and never saw his son again. Anthony J. Jordan argues that MacBride was a much-maligned man in the divorce proceedings. He posits that on the merit of W. B. Yeats believing Maud Gonne's accusations against her husband, successive biographers of Yeats have treated them as factual, ignoring the verdict of the Parisian Divorce Court which found MacBride innocent. Dr. Caoimhe Nic Dhaibhid writes that "The target of Jordan's argument has been a number of biographies of W. B. Yeats, particularly Roy Foster's landmark 1997". She appears to endorse Jordan's position. Donal Fallon's biography of MacBride quotes the poet Paul Durcan, son of MacBride's first cousin, as believing that MacBride "was unquestionably defamed" and lays much of the blame on the "people in the Yeats-Maud Gonne Industry".

About forty years after the marriage had ended, Maud herself attributed the breakdown of the marriage to John's loneliness and a drink problem in Paris, during her frequent trips to Ireland without him.

We had a house in Passy and John worked as Secretary to Victor Collins who earned a large salary as correspondent to the New York Sun and Laffan's Bureau, a fairly important newsagency in New York. Despite my warning John became the inseparable companion of Collins, who introduced him to a rather undesirable drinking set who usually foregathered in the American Bar. He had an unhappy life in Paris. He did not know a word of French and must often have been very lonely, as my work kept me much in Ireland.

On his return to Ireland, MacBride was respected for his Boer War service, but his reputation was clouded by his failed marriage and heavy drinking. Though he lived for a time with his friend Fred Allan, secured work as a Dublin water bailiff in 1910, contributed articles to the Freeman's Journal, and briefly held a seat on the Irish Republican Brotherhood Supreme Council, he was increasingly viewed as unreliable and by late 1911 was replaced by Seán Mac Diarmada.

== 1916 Easter Rising ==
MacBride was unaware of the planning for the Rising and came across it by accident. He was in Dublin early on Easter Monday morning to meet his brother Dr. Anthony MacBride, who was arriving from Westport to be married on the Wednesday. MacBride walked up Grafton St and saw Thomas MacDonagh in uniform and leading his troops. He offered his services and was appointed second-in-command at the Jacob's factory.

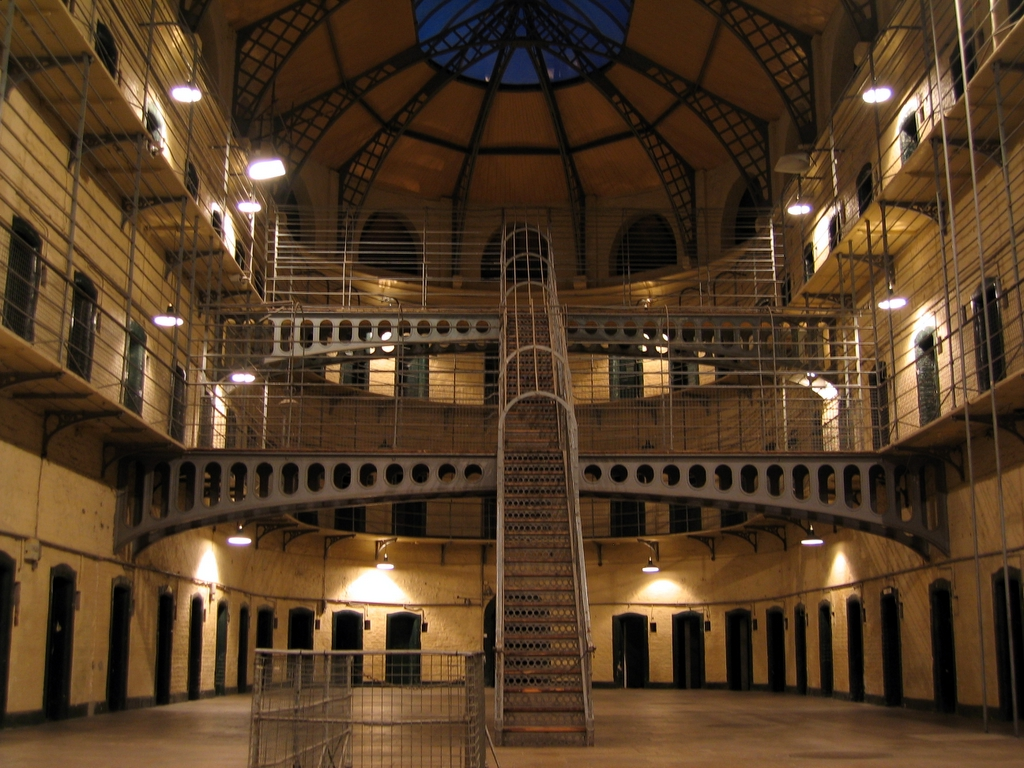
Kilmainham Gaol

After the Rising, MacBride was court-martialed under the Defence of the Realm Act and executed by firing squad in Dublin's Kilmainham Gaol on 5 May 1916. Just prior to his execution, he said he did not wish to be blindfolded, adding "I have looked down the muzzles of too many guns in the South African war to fear death and now please carry out your sentence". He is buried in Dublin's Arbour Hill Prison.

Yeats, who was jealous of MacBride for marrying Maud Gonne (and later proposed to her daughter Iseult) gave MacBride an ambivalent eulogy in his poem "Easter, 1916":

This other man I had dreamed
A drunken, vain-glorious lout.
He had done most bitter wrong
To some who are near my heart,
Yet I number him in the song;
He, too, has resigned his part
In the casual comedy;
He, too, has been changed in his turn,
Transformed utterly:
A terrible beauty is born.

Maud Gonne wrote to Yeats, "No I dont like your poem, it isn't worthy of you & above all it isn't worthy of its subject... As for my husband he has entered eternity by the great door of sacrifice… so that praying for him I can also ask for his prayers".

== Legacy ==
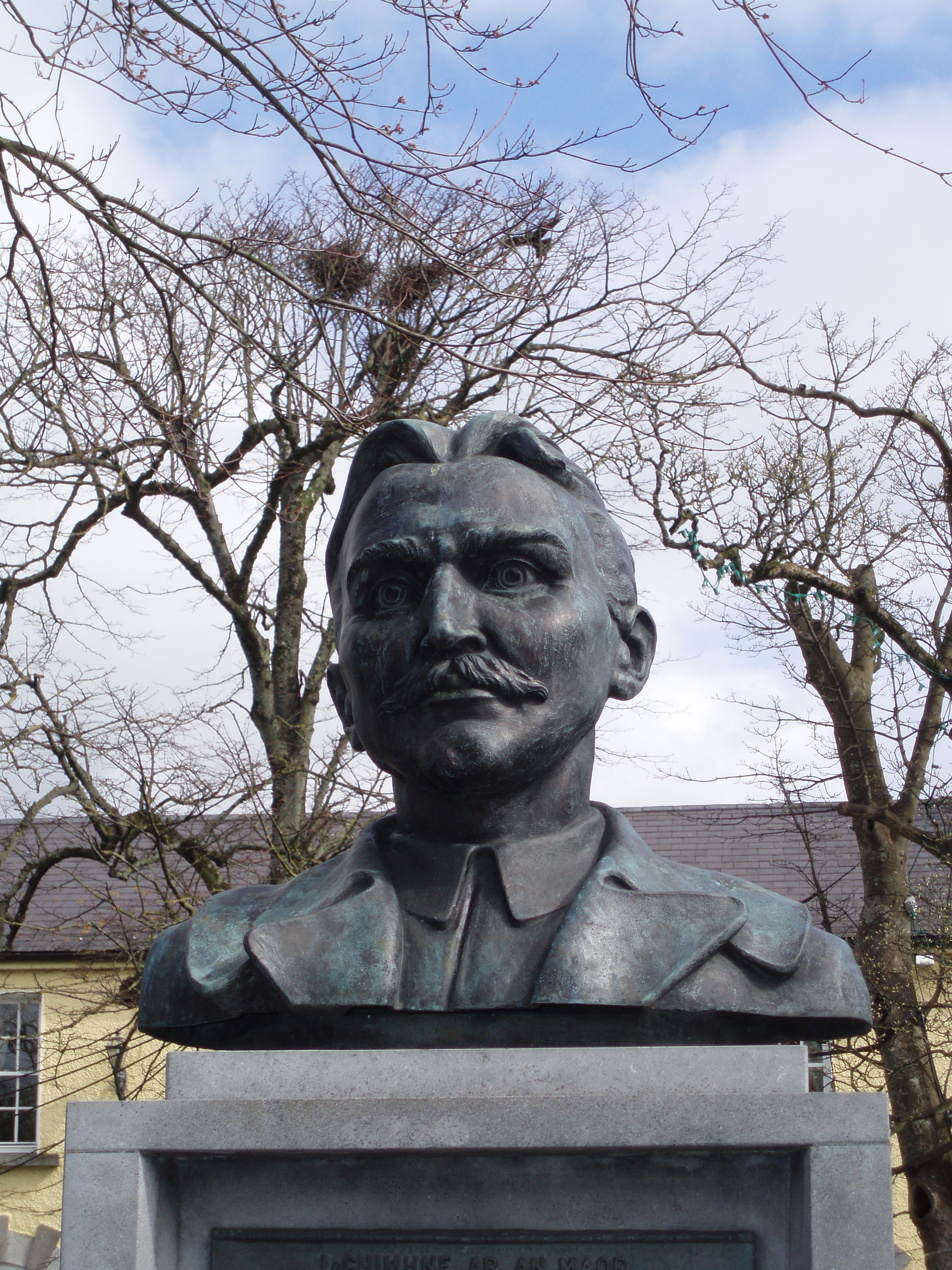
Statue of John MacBride (1868-1916) in his native Westport, County Mayo, at South Mall

In November 2016 Ciarán MacSuibhne, a member of the local St Patrick’s Drama Group wrote an amateur, three-act play detailing various stages in MacBride's life including his experiences in the Second Boer War, his marriage to and separation from Maud Gonne and the concern regarding the future of their only child, Seán, which followed. The play, which featured the poetry of Yeats, also covers the period following MacBride's execution. The opening and closing scenes of the play, in particular, were described as "very moving". The character of Maud Gonne's half-sister, Eileen Wilson was played by Wilson's great-granddaughter, Bernardine Walsh MacBride. The play, which was shown in the Westport Town Hall Theatre, was described by the Mayo News as "a fitting tribute by a local drama group to a local hero".

== Notes ==
=== Bibliography ===
- Boylan, Henry, A Dictionary of Irish Biography Dublin, Gill & Macmillan 1999
- Fallon, Donal (2015). John MacBride. Dublin: O'Brien Press.
- Jordan, Anthony J. ' Major John MacBride', Westport Historical Society 1991
- Jordan, Anthony J. ' Willie Yeats & the Gonne MacBrides', Westport Historical Society 1997.
- Jordan, Anthony J. ' The Yeats/Gonne/MacBride Triangle', Westport Books 2000.
- Jordan, Anthony J. (2006). Boer War to Easter Rising; the Writings of Major John MacBride. Westport Books. ISBN 978-0-9524447-6-3.
- McCracken, Donal P. 'MacBride's Brigade: Irish commandos in the Anglo-Boer war', Four Courts Press, Dublin 1999, 208pp, ISBN 1-85182-499-5.
- O'Malley, Ernie, On Another Man's Wound published 1937
- Purdon, Edward, The 1916 Rising Mercier Press Ltd 1999
