= Allegan =

Allegan is a city, county, and township in the U.S. state of Michigan:

- Allegan, Michigan
- Allegan County, Michigan
- Allegan Township, Michigan
- Allegan (meteorite), fell in 1899 in Michigan, United States

== See also ==
- Allergan, company
- Allergen
