= United States of America in the Second Boer War =

USA during the Boer War

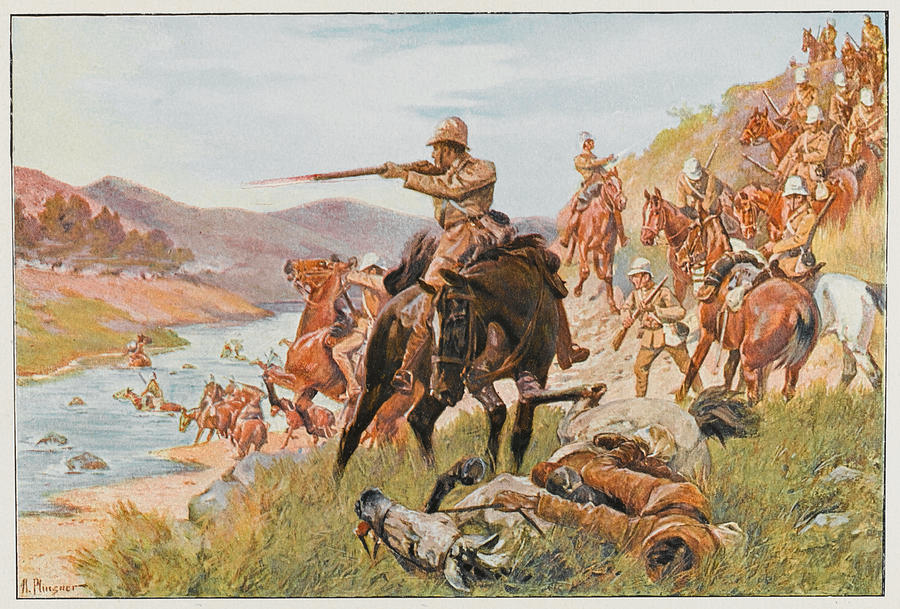
Regiment of cavalry, comrpised mostly of American Volunteers, at the Battle of Modder River

The Second Boer War was a conflict between Britain and the Boer Republics of South Africa. The United States of America was involved in the war in a number of ways, albeit they did not participate in the war itself. Diplomatic relations between Britain and the United States were influenced by the Boer War, and public opinion of the Boer War in the United States significantly affected American politics.

American volunteers were present on both sides, albeit with more fighting for the British rather than for the Boers. Some 300 Irish-Americans joined the Irish Transvaal Legion upon the outbreak of the war, with John Blake leading them. The American Scouts, a regiment of 80 strong, joined the Afrikaner side as well. Among many of the Americans who joined the British side was Frederick Russel Burnham, who aided the British during the campaign in the Orange Free State and Transvaal.

Coverage of the war tended to vary, with some publications siding with the Boers, such as the Omaha World-Herald. Others, such as the New York Times, sided with the British cause.
