= Jon Blake =

Jon Blake may refer to:

- Jon Blake (actor) (1958–2011), Australian actor
- Jon Blake (author) (born 1954), British author
- Jon Blake (broadcaster), Australian broadcaster
- Jon Blake, a character in The Wicked + The Divine

== See also ==
- John Blake (disambiguation)
