= Irish commandos =

- Flag of the Irish Transvaal Brigade, used by Irish nationalists
- Active: 1899–1902
- Country: United Kingdom
- Allegiance: Orange Free State; South African Republic; Cape Boers
- Branch: Boer Army - Boer foreign volunteers Composed of 2 Irish commando units: Irish Transvaal Brigade; Second Irish Brigade (consisting mainly of 150 Irish, Australian, Greek, German, Boer, and Italian volunteers)
- Type: Commandos
- Role: Guerrilla warfare
- Size: 150
- Engagements: Second Boer War

Commanders
- Notable commanders: General Lukas Meyer; Colonel John Y. F. Blake; John MacBride; Arthur Lynch

Two Irish Commandos, volunteer military units of guerrilla militia, fought alongside the Boers against the British forces during the Second Boer War (1899–1902).

== Background ==
Irish support for the Boers can be traced back to 1877 when several Irish parliamentarians, such as Charles Stewart Parnell, opposed laws to annex the South African Republic under British rule. Although the annexation was successful, many Irishmen continued to show support for the Boers during the First Anglo-Boer War; especially in 1881 following the British defeat at the Battle of Majuba Hill where an Irishman Alfred Aylward served as an adviser to the Boer General Piet Joubert during the battle. When rumours of a second war with the Boers began to surface, protesters led by James Connolly took to the streets in Dublin in August 1899 and public meetings were held across Ireland in support of the Boers. Several weeks later in Dublin, nearly twenty thousand marched in protest against the planned invasion of the South African Republic.

War followed from President Paul Kruger's ultimatum of 9 October 1899, which gave the British government 48 hours to comply. He declared war on Britain on 11 October.

The Irish Transvaal Brigade was established days before the outbreak of the Second Anglo-Boer War and initially consisted of Irishmen who worked in the Witwatersrand. The volunteers were given full citizenship and became Burghers of the Boer republics. The brigade was formed by Colonel John Blake, an Irish-American former officer in the US Army, who was later succeeded by John MacBride. Under the leadership of MacBride, the brigade was strengthened by volunteers travelling from Ireland who entered South Africa via Portuguese Mozambique.

== Irish American volunteers ==
Recruitment of volunteers for the Boer cause was supported by representatives of the New York United Irish Societies while Dutch Americans organised to influence US foreign policy towards the Boers. Fifty-eight men of the Irish American Ambulance Corps travelled from Chicago to New York City, where they were welcomed as heroes for the purpose of joining the war effort. In South Africa, upon their arrival in April 1900, they were welcomed by fellow Irish American John Y. F. Blake, removed their Red Cross armbands and joined the Irish Transvaal Brigade. The two Irish Americans, Michael O'Hara and Edward Egan, who died in battle were described as "New Martyrs to Liberty" by the American press.

== Irish Transvaal Brigade ==
The Irish Transvaal Brigade, also known as the Wreckers' Corps, was organised by John MacBride, who was then employed at the Rand Mines. Most of the company-strength Brigade were Irish or Irish-American miners living in the Transvaal who were willing to fight with the Boers against the British. The Brigade was bolstered during its campaign by a contingent of volunteers who came from Chicago and by a variety of Irish volunteers who travelled from America and Ireland to join the Brigade.

Irishmen who enlisted in the British Army also fought in the Boer War, which symbolised one of many moments in Irish history in which Irishmen had divided loyalties. That ultimately led to them fighting each other.

John MacBride wrote his own account of the Irish Transvaal Brigade, which can be found in Anthony J. Jordan's edited version of the writings of MacBride.

The Brigade would come to be known as MacBride's Brigade, after their commander, John MacBride. It was operational from September 1899 to September 1900, when the brigade fought in about 20 engagements, with 18 men killed and about 70 wounded from a complement of no more than about 300 men at any one time. When it disbanded, most of the men crossed into Mozambique, which was a colony of neutral Portugal. Colonel John YF Blake, a former US Army officer was the brigade's commander. When he was wounded, his second-in-command, Major John MacBride, took command.

Until the Siege of Ladysmith, the commandos were involved in guarding the artillery under Carolus Johannes Trichardt. The brigade also provided signal service at the Battle of Modderspruit.

At the Siege of Ladysmith, they serviced the famous Boer artillery piece, called Long Tom, and they fought at the Battle of Colenso. Having worked in the gold mines, they had a well-deserved reputation as demolition experts. They delayed the British advance on Pretoria by blowing up bridges. The brigade disbanded after the Battle of Bergendal.

The brigade received letters of thanks before they left South Africa from State Secretary Francis William Reitz, Commandant-General Louis Botha and General Ben Viljoen.

== Second commando ==
The Second Irish Brigade was formed in January 1900 by former members of the Irish Transvaal Brigade. Former Le Journal correspondent Arthur Lynch was appointed as the unit's commander. The brigade consisted of 150 commandos from a variety of ethnic backgrounds. Including among others Irish, Australian, Greek, German, Boer and Italian members.

The brigade remained attached to General Lukas Meyer's command in Natal, retiring to Laing's Nek after the siege of Ladysmith. The brigade fought in the rear guard, during the retreat from Ladysmith to Glencoe. The brigade was later ordered to Vereeniging but was disbanded while it was in Johannesburg. After the dissolution of the brigade, Lynch together with a small group of Irishmen joined various commandos along the Vaal River.

== See also ==
- Boer foreign volunteers
