= John Blake (rugby union) =

English rugby union player and teacher

John Blake (30 May 1933 – 9 September 1982) was a rugby player and teacher who captained Bristol Rugby through one of their most successful periods in the 1950s.

Blake, "the most influential individual in the history of the Bristol club", was a fly half, educated at St Brendan's College and Bristol University. He became captain of Bristol in 1957 and was central in the club's adoption of an adventurous and attractive style of play that became known as "rugby Bristol fashion".

Blake's approach to the game was immediately successful. During his first season in charge the club records for both points scored and wins in a season were broken. The points scored record was then broken in the two subsequent seasons.

Eschewing kicking, Blake emphasised passing and running with the ball. England selectors rejected this rugby philosophy and Blake never represented his country. He did, however play for Gloucestershire, Somerset, the Combined Services, the RAF and the Western Counties. He also played for the Barbarians.

By profession a teacher, Blake was an inspirational teacher of history at Henbury School in Bristol, as well as St Brendan's College, and was Headmaster of St Wilfrid's Catholic Comprehensive in Crawley, Sussex. He was buried in the graveyard of the Friary Church, Crawley.

== Bristol career ==
Appearances - 339 (1953–66) Tries - 92 Conversions - 3 Drop goals - 32

Total points scored 378

== Sources ==
Fox, David; Hoskins, Mark (2003). 100 Greats. Bristol Football Club (RFU). Tempus Publishing. ISBN 978-0752427355.

"1950–59". Bristol Rugby. Archived from the original on 27 September 2007.
