= Mary Loveless =

American physician

- Born: Mary Hewitt; April 28, 1899; Clovis, California
- Died: June 2, 1991 (aged 92); Westport, Connecticut
- Education: Stanford University (B.A. 1921, M.D. 1925)
- Medical career
- Profession: Physician
- Field: Immunology
- Institutions: Weill Cornell Medical College; New York Hospital; Roosevelt Hospital; San Francisco General Hospital
- Research: Hymenoptera allergy, hay fever

Mary Hewitt Loveless (April 28, 1899 – June 2, 1991) was an American physician and immunologist who specialized in allergies. She is best known for her discovery that Hymenoptera insect venom allergies could be treated with extracts of the insects' venom sacs.

== Early life ==
Mary Hewitt was born on April 28, 1899, in Clovis, California. Her parents, who were British, had migrated to the United States from England to escape an economic depression. She earned a Bachelor of Arts in biology at Stanford University in 1921, supporting herself by working as a waitress and a secretary. She then began a Doctor of Medicine at Stanford as one of only two women in her class and graduated in 1925. The same year, she married and took the surname Loveless; the marriage ended in divorce soon afterwards, but she would use the surname for the rest of her life.

== Medical career ==
Loveless completed her medical internship at San Francisco General Hospital before setting up a private practice in the city and taking on an assistant role at the Stanford University School of Medicine in the early 1930s. In 1935, she was recruited by Robert A. Cooke to work in his allergy research laboratory at Roosevelt Hospital in New York, where she studied the treatment of hay fever with pollen extracts. She left the position in 1938 for an appointment as associate professor of clinical medicine at Weill Cornell Medical College. There, she continued to research blocking antibodies and their antigens, specifically in relation to hay fever, and published a series of articles published in five installments in the Journal of Immunology between 1940 and 1943.

Loveless turned her attention to insect venom allergies in 1946 when a colleague asked if she knew how to prevent anaphylactic reactions in patients who suffered from hypersensitivity to Hymenoptera bites. At the time, the clinical standard involved creating extracts made from grinding up the entire body of an insect and administering it in order to desensitize patients. Loveless hypothesized, however, that the allergens were concentrated in the insect venom rather than the whole body, and thus that injections of venom-sac extract would be a more effective therapy. Since pure venom was unavailable, she collected and anesthetized insect samples herself before removing their venom sacs to prepare for injecting into her patients; by 1964, she had dissected some 30,000 insects, and reported that she had become so proficient at the process that she could dissect "a bug a minute". From 1953 to 1956, she injected patients at her allergy clinic with increasing doses of venom and monitored their reactions to subsequent bee and wasp stings. Receiving booster doses each year, these patients developed immunity to the insect venom and were no longer susceptible to anaphylaxis.

In 1956 Loveless published the article "Wasp Venom Allergy and Immunity" based on the research she had performed at her clinic. Although well received by the popular press, her research was largely ignored by the scientific community, and it was not until the 1970s—after the publication of further research into venom immunotherapy by Lawrence M. Lichtenstein, Martin D. Valentine and Anne Kagey-Sobotka—that the U.S. Food and Drug Administration approved the use of venom extracts to treat patients with allergies to insect venom. By the early 1990s, Loveless's contributions to the field of immunology were more widely recognized, and the American Association of Immunologists (AAI) dubbed her a "pioneer clinical immunologist". In total, she authored more than 70 research articles in her field. She was a member of the AAI and the Harvey Society, and a fellow of the American Academy of Allergy, Asthma, and Immunology.

== Death and legacy ==
Loveless retired in 1964 but continued to practice privately. She died on June 2, 1991, in Westport, Connecticut, at the age of 92. She bequeathed US$4 million from her estate to the Stanford University School of Medicine, which established the Mary Hewitt Loveless, M.D. Professorship in the School of Medicine in her honor.
