= Burr Shafer =

American cartoonist

Burr Shafer (October 24, 1899 – June 25, 1965) was an American cartoonist. His cartoon collections featured the character of J. Wesley Smith appearing in various historical settings. The underlying gag was that Smith was history's greatest wrong-guesser, constantly sneering at historical or cultural turning points that his modern audience knew would turn out to be significant. These sometimes-obscure historical satires moved U.S. President Harry S. Truman to write "I'm very proud that I'm smart enough to get the point." His cartoons appeared in The New Yorker and The Saturday Review of Literature.

The J. Wesley Smith character, while not explicitly identified with the explorer John Smith, was depicted in the explorer's situation in a cartoon panel about Pocahontas. The joke, as he had his head on her father's chopping block with the ax about to come down, was that, with the middle name of Wesley, he should not be confused with real John Smith.

Burr Shafer died in Orange County, California.
