= Harry R. Wellman =

American academic (1899–1997)

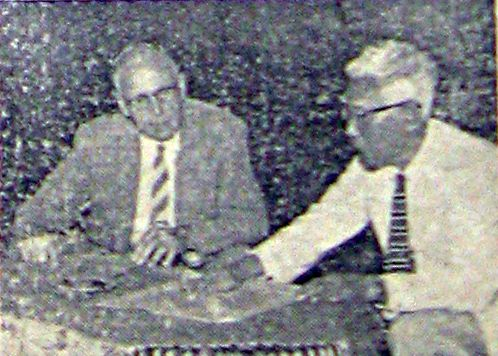
- Wellman (left) with Sardjito in Indonesia, 1961

Acting President University of California
- In office 1967–1967

Personal details
- Born: March 4, 1899 Mountain View, Alberta, Canada
- Died: August 18, 1997 (aged 98)
- Spouse: Ruth L. Gay
- Education: Oregon Agricultural College; University of California, Berkeley
- Profession: Economist, educator, administrator
- Institutions: University of California, Berkeley; University of California, Davis

Harrison Richard Wellman (March 4, 1899 – August 18, 1997) was professor of agricultural economics at the University of California, Berkeley, and became acting president of the University of California in 1967.

== Early years ==
Wellman and a twin brother were the youngest of eight children of Richard Harrison Wellman and his second wife, Jennie (Woods) Wellman. Harry's family was living just north of the Canada–United States border when he was born. His mother died less than a year after he was born. Harry and his siblings initially moved to his maternal grandparents' ranch in Montana, and then to a family wheat farm in Umapine, Oregon. Two sisters and his twin brother died during the winter of 1902/3.

Wellman served in the United States Navy through World War I after his father died in 1917.

Wellman became a naturalized citizen of the United States and graduated from Oregon Agricultural College in 1921. He married Ruth L. Gay following graduation, and was the 4-H Club agent of Malheur County, Oregon. Wellman then studied at the University of California, Berkeley, where he received a Master of Science degree in 1924 and, in 1926, the first Doctor of Philosophy degree in agricultural economics awarded by the University.

== Career ==
Wellman was an agricultural economics specialist in the College of Agriculture cooperative extension service from 1925 until 1934. In 1929, he became an associate in the Giannini Foundation of Agricultural Economics. He returned to Berkeley in 1935 after serving a year in Washington, D.C., as chief of the General Crops Section of the United States Agricultural Adjustment Administration. He was an associate professor of agricultural economics in the College of Agriculture and an associate agricultural economist in the Agriculture Experiment Station. He became a full professor in 1939 and was appointed director of the Giannini Foundation in 1942. He served as a director of the Federal Reserve Bank of San Francisco from 1943 to 1954. Wellman became the first vice president of the University of California in 1958 after serving since 1952 as vice president-agricultural sciences. He served as acting president of the University in 1967.

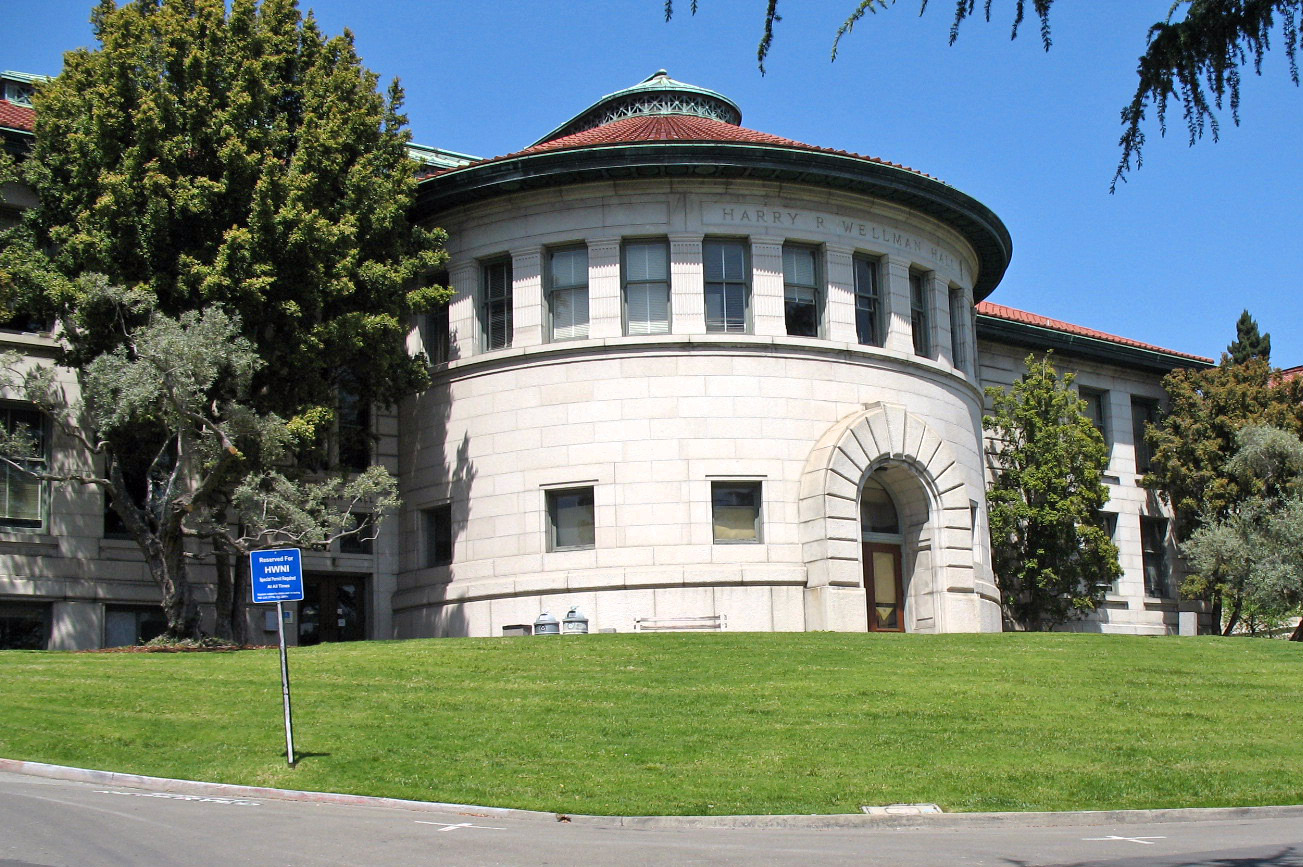
Harry R. Wellman Hall on the University of California Berkeley campus is listed on the National Register of Historic Places.

== Legacy and honors ==
Wellman Halls on both the University of California Berkeley campus and Davis campus are named for Harry Wellman.
