= Siderography =

Siderography is a mechanical process developed by Jacob Perkins in the early 1800s enabling the unlimited reproduction of engraved steel plates. The process enables the transfer of an impression from a steel plate to a steel cylinder in a rolling press. An individual who engraves steel plates was known as a siderographist in the mid 1800s, and a siderographer by the early 1900s.

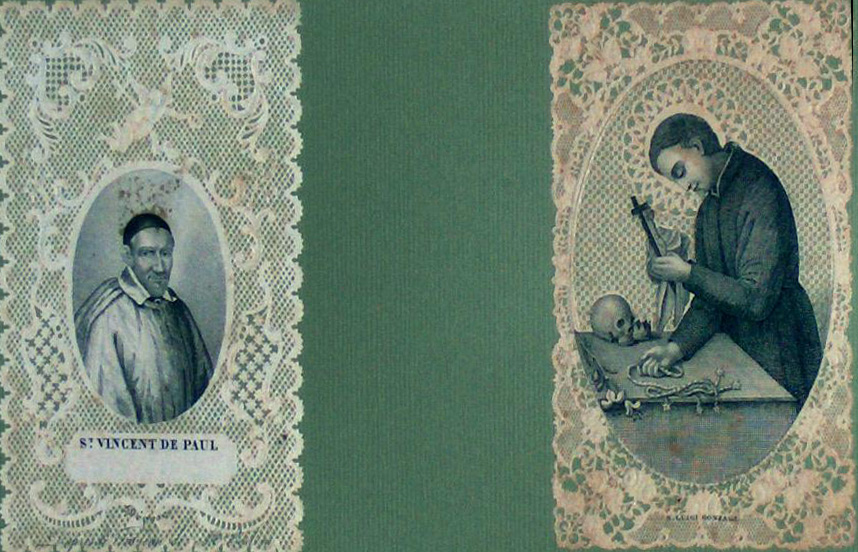
Two devotional pictures : Saint Vincent de Paul (French make, 1860) and Aloysius Gonzaga (Turin, 1860); two mechanically punched siderographies

Perkins developed the use of steel plates in banknote production in 1805, and these were more resistant to wear from printing than copper plates. Siderography enabled the steel plates to be copied with greater frequency. It was first used for printing banknotes of the United States dollar.

Counterfeiting had become an important issue in Europe in the late 1700s and early 1800s, primarily because the banknotes were produced with no standardized process or design, using readily available technology and techniques familiar to over 10,000 copper engravers. France offered a prize contest in the 1790s as a result of the counterfeiting of assignats. One of the submitted proposals for this contest had been the use of siderography, though it was not viable at the time.

The English banknotes of that era came to be known as "filthy rags", and in 1817, the Bank of England advertised a contest for the submission of a process to develop counterfeit-resistant banknotes, for which the winning entry would receive £20,000. Perkins moved to England in 1818, and made preparations for equipment, machinery, and his workmen to follow him. He submitted his proposal for the use of siderography in banknote production, but the idea was not well received by the Bank of England. Despite this, the idea gained traction, and by the end of the 1920s siderography was in use by over 200 banks in the United Kingdom.

By the 1930s, a transfer press was operated by a siderographer, who would manipulate a "system of compound levers" on the press to regulate the amount of pressure exerted on the transfer rolls.

== Trade union ==
On 11 January 1899, the Steel Plate Transferrers' Association trade union was established in Washington, D.C., which by 1921 had changed its name to the International Association of Siderographers. It was the smallest organization by membership in the AFL–CIO (American Federation of Labor and Congress of Industrial Organizations), reaching a peak of about 80 members in the 1930s, and was dissolved in 1991 after retirements and technological advances reduced its membership to eight people.

It had three local chapters: the Washington office had jurisdiction for membership in that city, and all members outside the United States excluding Canada and Great Britain; the New York office had jurisdiction for all members in the United States excluding Washington, D.C.; and the Ottawa office had jurisdiction for all members in Canada and Great Britain.
