= Carl G. Fenner =

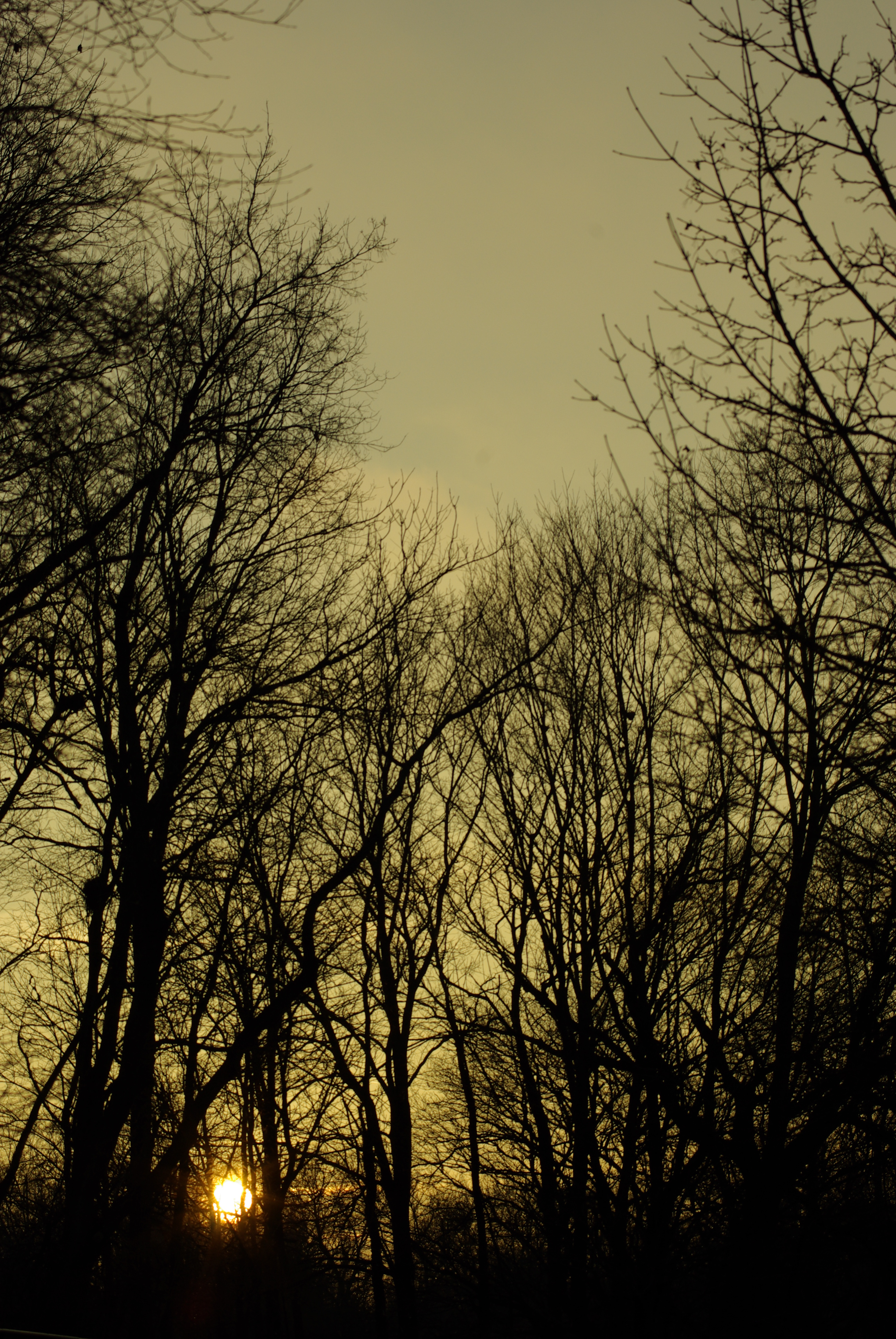
Sunset in Fenner Arboretum on December 25, 2007

Carl G. Fenner (July 23, 1899 – November 26, 1991) was the President of the National Association of Trees in the 1930s and the Director of the Michigan Department of Parks. The Carl G. Fenner Nature Center (formerly the Carl. G. Fenner Arboretum) in Lansing, Michigan bears his name.
