= History of the American League =

The history of the American League of Professional Baseball Clubs stretches back into the late-19th century. Prior to 2000, when the AL and NL were dissolved as separate entities and merged into the organization called Major League Baseball, the American League was one of the two leagues that made up major league baseball. Originally a minor league known as the Western League, the league later developed into a major league after the American Association disbanded. In its early history, the Western League struggled until 1894, when Ban Johnson became the president of the league. Johnson led the Western League into major league status and soon became the president of the newly renamed American League.

== Early history ==
The earliest predecessor to the American League was the Northwestern League, a minor league with teams based in the Midwestern United States. Along with the National League and American Association, the Northwestern League was one of the three leagues that signed the National Agreement, an agreement wherein the signers covenanted to honor contractual agreements between players and teams and set a minimum salary for players. The league soon became known as the Western League, and went through financial woes, including disbanding multiple times. Along with Ban Johnson, Charles Comiskey purchased the Western League in 1892.

Ban Johnson was the president of the Western League and was the eventual president of the American League.

Johnson hoped to clean up the sport of baseball by purchasing the league, including allowing umpires to suspend players who used profanity and disputed calls. Johnson hoped to use his league as an example of a well-run league that was organized, profitable, entertaining and appealing. In Johnson's first season at the helm of the Western League, 1894, most of the league's franchises turned a profit and by 1895 attendance began to climb for teams around the league. In 1896, Johnson brought Connie Mack in as a manager of the Milwaukee, Wisconsin team and he became a major piece in what would soon be the American League. The first signs that the Western League could become a major league appeared when the league began to attract many high caliber players and managers, and attendance ratings continued to climb.

=== Transition to a major league ===
Johnson and his associates Comiskey and Mack thought that they could make a move at becoming a major league by the turn of the 20th century, but knew that they would face the same struggles as the failed American Association. During a meeting of Western League owners at Chicago's Great Northern Hotel on October 11, 1899, the league's name was changed to the American League of Professional Baseball Clubs. At the time of the name change, the National League was struggling in attendance, while in comparison, the American League had a zero tolerance for foul language and behavior, bolstering attendance because of its image. In The Arrival of the American League, author Warren N. Wilbert described the National League as having a monopoly on Major League Baseball at the time.

The Western League disbanded after the 1899 season so that owners Johnson and Comiskey could pursue major league options. The Western League was re-created in a new form by a new owner. However, it had no association with the original league led by Johnson. Johnson and Comiskey continued their hopes of creating a major league and by 1900, the duo created a franchise in the city of Chicago by moving the St. Paul Saints to that city. The Chicago franchise, together with seven additional former Western League franchises, were established in Buffalo, Detroit, Indianapolis, Cleveland (moved from Grand Rapids), Minneapolis, Milwaukee, and Kansas City. Before the 1901 season, the American League, often misprinted in news papers as the "American Association", was classified as a "special class", a level above Class-A minor league baseball. Indianapolis, Minneapolis, and Buffalo were dropped as franchises before the 1901 season and new teams added in Baltimore, Philadelphia and Boston. The Kansas City club was moved to Washington, D.C. that same year.

== Major league beginning ==
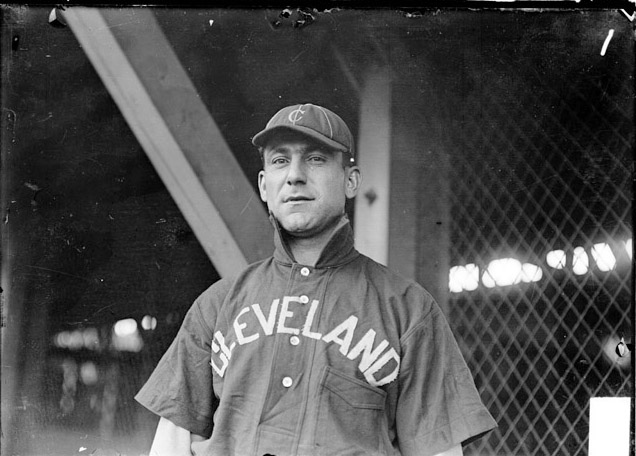
Nap Lajoie was signed by the American League from the National League. He was paid $3,600 over the NL maximum when he signed with the Philadelphia Athletics.

The 1901 season was the first season that the American League (AL) was classified as a "major league". The AL comprised clubs in Chicago (nicknamed the White Stockings by sportswriters for their uniform hosiery), Boston (soon informally dubbed "Americans" to distinguish them from the city's National League club), Detroit (an original Western League franchise which, unusually for the time, had an official team name, Tigers), Philadelphia (which took up the historic name of the Athletic Club), Baltimore (which revived the Orioles nickname used by the 1890s NL team), Washington (inevitably dubbed "Senators" by press and fans alike), Cleveland (often referred to as the "Blue" or the "Blues" for their uniforms), and Milwaukee (another original WL team which carried over its nickname of "Brewers"). The first game in American League history was played on April 24, 1901, at South Side Park, with eventual pennant-winner Chicago defeating Cleveland by a score of eight runs to two.

The AL lured many stars of the time due to the fact that they did not have a maximum salary, unlike the National League. In all, over 100 players switched leagues, including many big National League stars of the time such as John McGraw, Cy Young, Clark Griffith, Hugh Duffy, and Jimmy Collins. Notably, Nap Lajoie was signed by Connie Mack to a $6,000 contract ($3,600 over the National League's maximum salary), $184,000 in today's standards. Over the early years of the American League, they drew far more attendance to their games than the National League.

The Orioles fell into debt, with star player Joe Kelley reporting that the team owed as much as $12,000 ($446,538 in current dollar terms). Unable to afford that debt, part-owner John Mahon began to purchase shares of the team in July 1902 from Kelley, his son-in-law, and player-manager John McGraw, who had resigned from the team and signed with the New York Giants of the NL. With this, Mahon became the majority shareholder. On July 17, 1902, Mahon sold his interest in the Orioles to Andrew Freedman, principal owner of the Giants, and John T. Brush, principal owner of the Cincinnati Reds, also of the NL. That day, Freedman and Brush released McGraw, Kelley, Joe McGinnity, Roger Bresnahan, Jack Cronin, Cy Seymour, and Dan McGann from their Oriole contracts. Brush then signed Kelley and Seymour to the Reds, while Freedman signed McGinnity, Bresnahan, Cronin, and McGann, joining McGraw, his new player-manager, on the Giants. Johnson was forced to join with the Orioles' minority owners to seize control of the team using league rules and restock the team using players on loan from other AL franchises, but the Orioles had to forfeit their game that day due to not having enough players.

After the 1902 season, a "peace" agreement was reached by the two leagues. The National League had hoped for a merger. However, Johnson knew he had the upper hand, and persuaded the National League to recognize the American League as an equal partner instead. Following the regular season in 1903, the winners of the American League pennant and the National League pennant played each other in the inaugural World Series. The Boston Americans (now the Red Sox) defeated the NL representatives, the Pittsburgh Pirates. In retaliation, the National League refused to play a World Series the following year, when the American League expanded its schedule to 154 games. World Series play resumed in 1905 and has continued every year since, except the strike-shortened 1994 season.

=== Black Sox scandal and revival ===
During the 1919 World Series, members of the Chicago White Sox of the American League intentionally lost the series to make money off of the Cincinnati Reds win. The fix, which led to eight members of the team being banned from baseball for life, was put on by the White Sox first baseman Chick Gandil with the help of professional gambler Joseph "Sport" Sullivan and gangster Arnold Rothstein. It was stemmed from payment disagreements between the members of the team and its owner, Charles Comiskey.

Amidst the Black Sox scandal, Ban Johnson's control of the American League slipped. Johnson held the post until 1927, when he resigned and Ernest S. Barnard took over operations as the American League president. Following the Black Sox scandal, the American League championed New York Yankees outfielder Babe Ruth. In 1920, Ruth hit 54 home runs and drew many to the ball parks. The American League sold five million tickets, over a million and a half over the National League total. Ruth's 54 home runs was 35 above the runner-up, George Sisler.

=== Hitting success ===
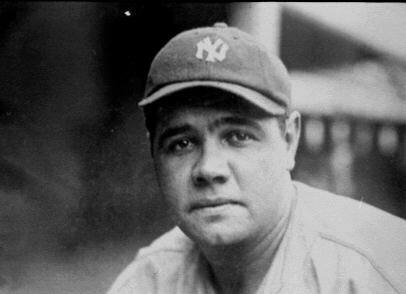
Babe Ruth played the majority of his career in the American League.

Before the 1920s, pitching dominated both leagues. In 1920, both leagues adopted new rules against defacing baseballs. Led by Babe Ruth, hitters in the American League dominated the pitching competition. Attendance was mostly even with the National League through the 1920s. From 1927 to 1930, the National League beat the American League in attendance for the first time since the American League became a major league. Through the 1930s, high scoring continued in the American League, unlike the National League where runs were becoming scarce. In every year from 1931 through 1942, the American League outscored the National League. From the same 12-year time period, the American League led in attendance six time while the National League led six times, despite the scoring dependency.

== Mid-to-late 20th century ==
=== World War II and desegregation ===
Like nearly everything else, Major League Baseball was affected by the United States involvement in World War II. Players off of every roster in the American League served in a branch of the United States Military; of 144 major-league starters on Opening Day of 1941, only 26 were still in baseball by 1945. More than a thousand current or former major-leaguers served in the military during the war. One player, Elmer Gedeon, from the American League was killed in action. Gedeon played outfield for the Washington Senators before he joined the United States Army in March 1941. Notable players who served from the American League included Ted Williams, Joe DiMaggio, Bob Feller, Hank Greenberg and Phil Rizzuto. On the playing field, scoring was noticeably lower; most players were over 35, or classified 4-F for physical disabilities. Due to material restrictions, baseballs were reused, unlike the previous years where the baseball's "sanitary" integrity was kept.

Jackie Robinson from the National League's Brooklyn Dodgers was the first African American major league player of the 20th century. In the American League, the first player to break the color barrier was Larry Doby with the Cleveland Indians in 1947. By 1955, there were still two all-Caucasian American League teams, the Detroit Tigers and the Boston Red Sox, compared to just one in the National League. Writer Steve Treder from The Hardball Times noted that the fact that the American League employed fewer African Americans led to a discrepancy in talent, giving the National League the upper hand. Over the time period of racial desegregation in baseball, the American League had better attendance than the National League for most of the seasons. Starting in 1956, the National League began a 33-year streak of attendance superiority over the American League. Treder again asserted that the American League failed to desegregate their league as fast and eagerly as the National League, however, he states that by the 1960s the American League started to catch-up.

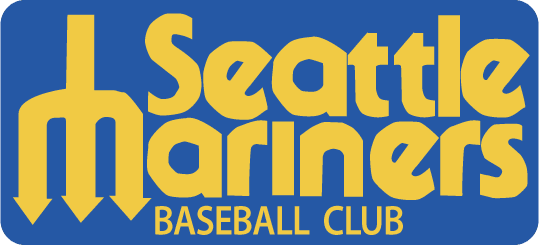
The Seattle Mariners were established in 1977 making them one of eight teams either established or moved from 1954 to 1977.

=== Expansion era and franchise shifts ===
Over the last half of the 20th century, the league expanded and teams changed locales. The St. Louis Browns relocated to Baltimore, Maryland and became the "Baltimore Orioles" in 1954 (the very first time a team actually moved east instead of south or west). After the '54 season the Philadelphia Athletics moved to Kansas City, Missouri to become the "Kansas City Athletics" (before moving again to Oakland, California in 1968). After the 1960 season, the Washington Senators moved to Minneapolis to become the "Minnesota Twins". Two expansion teams began play in the AL for the 1961 season, the Los Angeles Angels and a new version of the Washington Senators (not to be confused with the aforementioned franchise). Two more expansion teams then began league play in 1969, the Kansas City Royals and the Seattle Pilots. After the Seattle Pilots' first season, they moved to Milwaukee, Wisconsin and became the "Milwaukee Brewers". The Senators then relocated to the Dallas–Fort Worth metropolitan area and were renamed the "Texas Rangers" after the 1971 season. Beginning in 1977, the Toronto Blue Jays and the Seattle Mariners began league play. Before the 1998 season, the Milwaukee Brewers shifted to the National League while an expansion team, the Tampa Bay Devil Rays began play, eventually shortening their name to simply the "Tampa Bay Rays" before the 2008 season.

Prior to the 2013 season, the Houston Astros shifted play from the National League to the American League.

==== Designated hitter rule ====
In the years before the Designated hitter rule was implemented, the American League was heavily outscored by the National League. In 1973, a rule change adding a designated hitter on an experimental basis was added. The rule added a batter designated to hit only, and not play defense. The old rule had the pitcher in the batting lineup. The National League used the old rule until the 2022 season. Scoring in the American League jumped 23 percent and the "experimental" tag was dropped. From 1973 to 2003, the American League out scored the National League. Another jump in 1973 was the attendance numbers for the American League. Up 27 percent from the year before, the American League was still losing the attendance race to the National League after the implementation of the rule.

== See also ==
- List of American League pennant winners
- List of American League Wild Card winners
