= John Thomas Blake =

John Thomas Blake (4 April 1853–26 November 1940) was a New Zealand surveyor, interpreter, land agent, historian, racehorse owner and trainer. Of Māori descent, he identified with the Taranaki iwi. He was born in Auckland, Auckland, New Zealand on 4 April 1853.
