= Margaret Atwood Judson =

American historian and author

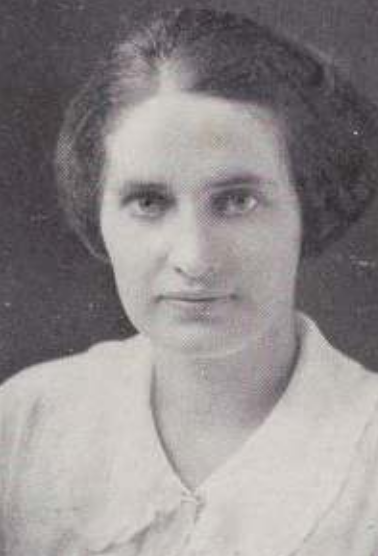
- Margaret Atwood Judson, from the 1922 Mount Holyoke College yearbook
- Born: November 5, 1899; Winsted, Connecticut, U.S.
- Died: March 23, 1991 (aged 91); Piscataway, New Jersey, U.S.
- Awards: Guggenheim Fellowship (1954)

Academic background
- Education: Mount Holyoke College; Radcliffe College

Academic work
- Discipline: British history
- Institutions: Rutgers University

Margaret Atwood Judson (November 5, 1899 – March 23, 1991) was an American historian and writer.

Judson was born in Winsted, Connecticut on November 5, 1899. She graduated from Mount Holyoke College in 1922 before attending Radcliffe College where she completed an M.A. in 1923 and her Ph.D. in 1933.

== Career ==
She began working as an instructor of history at Douglass College at Rutgers University in 1928. She became an assistant professor in 1933, associate professor in 1942 and a full professor in 1948. She was chairwoman of the history department between 1955 and 1963 before retiring from Rutgers University in 1966 however she returned to become the acting dean of the college until 1967. A chair at the university, the Margaret Atwood Judson Professor of History, is named after her.

She was a founding member of the American Historical Association and remained a member for sixty one years. In December 1990, Judson received an Award for Scholarly Distinction from the Association.

She was awarded a Guggenheim Fellowship in 1954.

Judson died on March 23, 1991, in Piscataway, New Jersey.

== Bibliography ==
- The Crisis of the English Constitution, 1949
- The Political Thought of Sir Henry Vane the Younger, 1969
- From Tradition to Political Reality, 1980
- Breaking the Barrier: A Professional Autobiography by a Woman Educator and Historian Before the Women's Movement, 1984
