= Fort Logan and Blockhouse =

- U.S. National Register of Historic Places
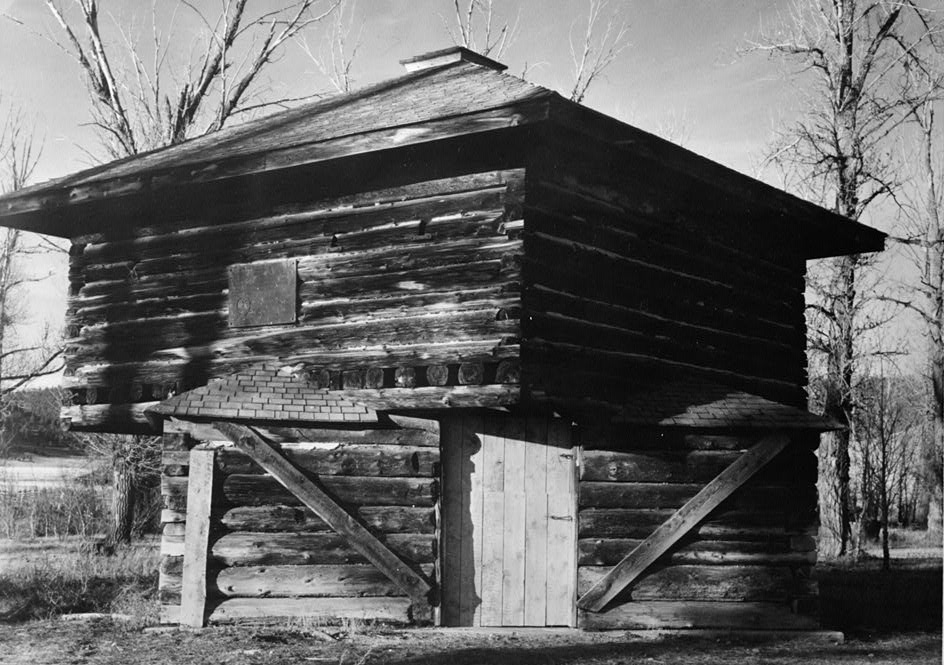
- Fort Logan Blockhouse

- Location within Montana Location within the United States
- Location: 17 miles northwest of White Sulphur Springs, Montana
- Coordinates: 46°40′48″N 111°10′03″W
- Architectural style: Military
- NRHP reference No.: 70000360
- Added to NRHP: October 6, 1970

Fort Logan and Blockhouse is a site on the National Register of Historic Places located near White Sulphur Springs, Montana. It was added to the Register on October 6, 1970. The blockhouse is all that remains of the fort structures. It was restored in 1924, then moved from its original location to the center of the parade grounds in 1962.

The fort was originally named Camp Baker for Major Eugene M. Baker, and established on 1 November 1869 on the bank of Smith River ten miles north of the current location. Its purpose was to protect the Benton freight route as well as local miners and settlers. It was moved in March 1870 to its current location. Camp Baker was renamed Fort Logan in 1877 for Captain Logan, who fell at the Battle of the Big Hole. The fort was terminated 27 October 1880 and the property auctioned 4 June 1881.

Judge William Gaddis, post trader and postmaster since 1873, purchased the fort and surrounding land in 1881 which he made into a large and prosperous cattle ranch. He continued as postmaster nearly until his death. Josephine Rader became the postmaster in 1907, moving the post office to her ranch, one mile west. In 1918 she sold the ranch to James Doggett. He and his wife Lugene Doggett served as post master until Lugene retired in 1929, and the post office was discontinued. The community maintained the Fort Logan name long after.

== Bibliography ==
- Gannett, Henry (1905). The Origin of Certain Place Names in the United States. Washington, D.C.: Government Printing Office. p. 129.
- Rockwell, Ronald V. (2009). The U.S. Army in Frontier Montana. Helena, Mont.: Sweetgrass Books. ISBN 9781591520658.
