= Allegan (meteorite) =

Meteorite found in the United States

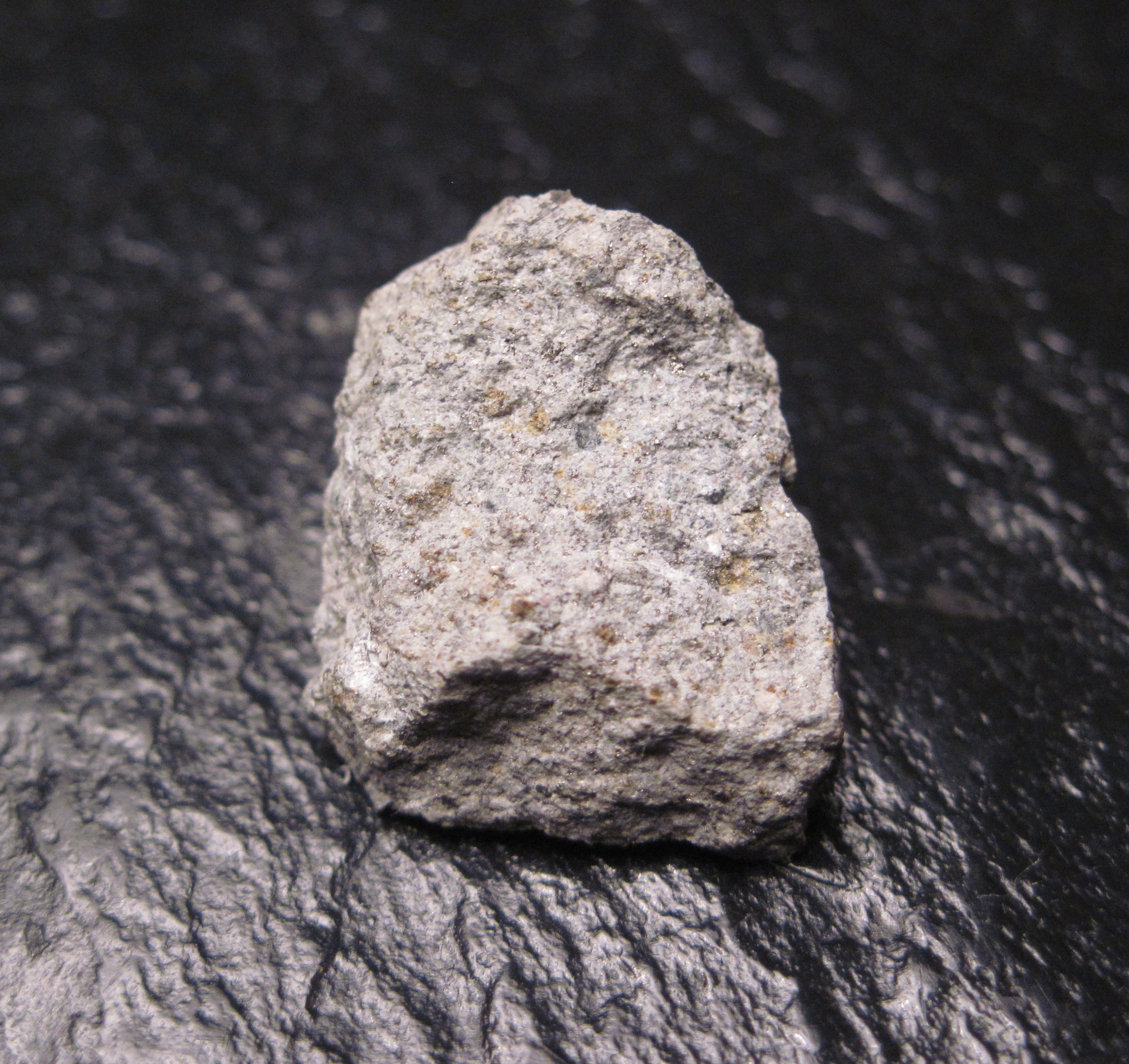
- Type: Chondrite
- Class: Ordinary chondrite
- Group: H5
- Country: United States
- Region: Michigan
- Coordinates: 42°32′N 85°53′W
- Observed fall: Yes
- Fall date: July 10, 1899
- TKW: 32 kg
- Related media on Wikimedia Commons

Allegan is a type 5 H chondrite meteorite that landed west of Allegan, Michigan on July 10, 1899. Allegan weighed around fifty pounds after its landing. As of 1964, it was one of only seven known meteorites to land in Michigan.

== Classification ==
It is classified as H5-ordinary chondrite.

== See also ==
- Glossary of meteoritics
- Meteorite falls
- Ordinary chondrite
