= Anthony J. Jordan =

Irish biographer

Anthony "Tony" J. Jordan (1942 - 3 May 2023) was an Irish biographer. He was a native of Ballyhaunis, County Mayo. Jordan was a graduate of NUI Maynooth, University College Dublin, and St. Patrick's College, Drumcondra. He initially specialized in writing 'first' biographies. His early interest centered on the interaction between the figures of Major John MacBride, W. B. Yeats, and Maud Gonne. After discovering the MacBride Papers in the National Library of Ireland, he made them available through his books in elucidation on MacBride from the criticism by W. B. Yeats and his admirers.

== Publications ==
- Tell my Mother I... A Novel of Adoption. ISBN 9780957622937 2020
- Maud Gonne's Men Westport Books ISBN 9780957622944 2018
- James Joyce Unplugged Westport Books ISBN 9780957622920 2017
- "William Thomas Cosgrave", in Dublin City Council and the 1916 Rising, (ed.) Gibney John Dublin City Council ISBN 9781907002342 2016
- A Jesus Biography 2015 Westport Books ISBN 9780957622913 2015
- Arthur Griffith with James Joyce and W.B. Yeats – Liberating Ireland. Westport Books. ISBN 9780957622906 2013
- Eamon DeValera 1882–1975 Irish: Catholic: Visionary. Westport Books. ISBN 9780952444794 2010
- The Good Samaritans, Memoir of a Biographer. Westport Books. ISBN 978-0-9524447-5-6 2008
- John A Costello 1891–1976 Compromise Taoiseach. Westport Books. ISBN 9780952444787 2007
- WT Cosgrave A Founder of Modern Ireland. Westport Books. ISBN 0952444771 2006
- "Christmas 1987 in The Quiet Quarter" Anthology of New Irish Writing Edited by Eoin Brady, New Island 2004. ISBN 1904301622.
- W.B. YEATS Vain, Glorious Lout. A Maker of Modern Ireland. Westport Books. ISBN 0952444720. 2003.
- The Yeats/Gonne/MacBride Triangle Westport Books ISBN 0952444747 2000
- Christy Brown's Women – a biography. Westport Books. ISBN 0952444712 1998
- Willie Yeats and the Gonne-MacBrides. Westport Books. ISBN 0952444712. 1997
- Churchill a founder of modern Ireland. Westport Books. ISBN 0952444704. 1995
- To Laugh or To Weep A Biography of Conor Cruise O'Brien. Blackwater Press. ISBN 0861214439 1994
- Sean - A Biography of Sean MacBride Blackwater Press. ISBN 0861214439 1992
- "Major John MacBride 1865–1916" MacDonagh & MacBride & Connolly & Pearse. Westport Historical Society. ISBN 0951414828 1991
