= John Blake (soldier) =

Irish-American soldier and writer

John Young Fillmore Blake
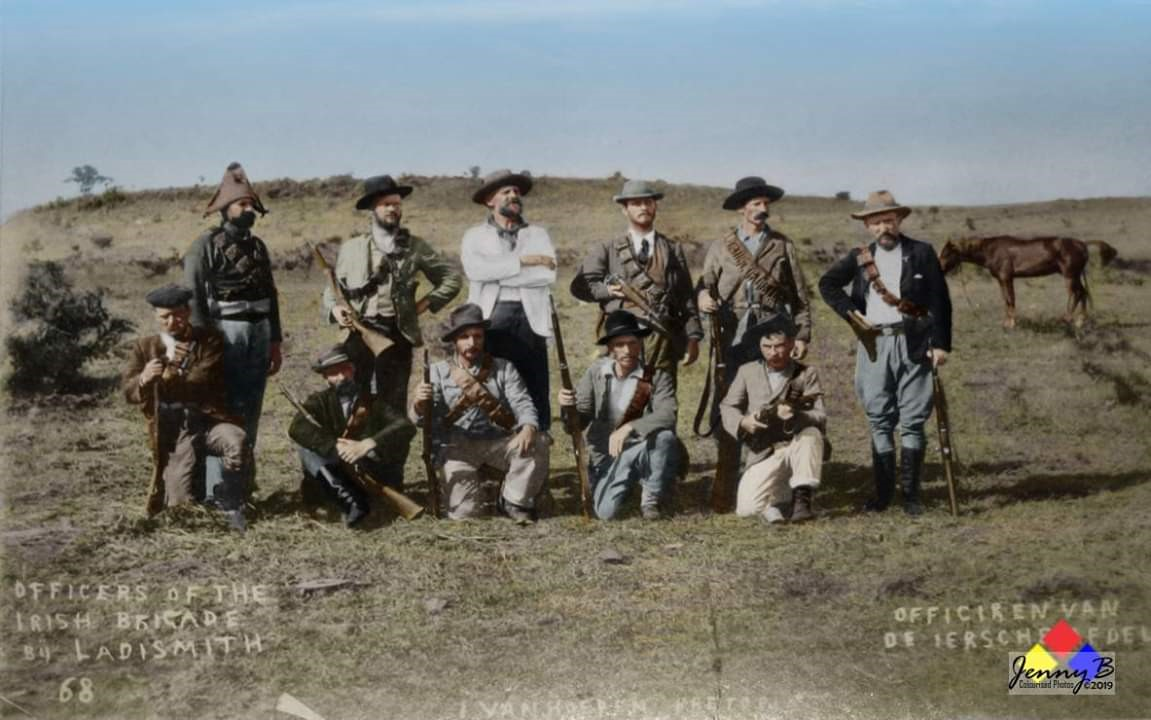
- John Blake alongside officers of the Irish Brigade. Blake stands third from left.
- Born: October 6, 1856; Bolivar, Missouri, United States
- Died: January 24, 1907 (aged 50); Manhattan, New York City, New York, United States
- Burial place: West Point Cemetery, West Point, New York, United States
- Education: United States Military Academy
- Military career
- Allegiance: United States; South African Republic
- Branch: United States Army; Boer foreign volunteers
- Colonel
- Nickname: Beau
- Units: 6th Cavalry Regiment; Navajo Scouts; Irish Transvaal Brigade
- Commands: Irish Transvaal Brigade
- Conflicts: Apache Wars; Geronimo Campaign; Second Boer War; Battle of Modderspruit (WIA); Siege of Ladysmith; Battle of Colenso
- Other work: A West Pointer with the Boers

John Young Filmore Blake (October 6, 1856 – January 24, 1907), also known as John Y.F. Blake and J.Y.F. Blake was an Irish-American soldier and writer. Blake served as a foreign volunteer for the Boers of the South African Republic during the Second Boer War.

== Early life ==
After his birth in 1856, Blake's family soon moved to Denton County, Texas. There he grew up cattle ranching and learned to ride horses. His father sent him to the University of Arkansas at Fayetteville in 1871. Soon after graduating, he received an appointment to West Point in 1876. Upon graduating from West Point in June 1880, Blake began his military career, assigned as a 2nd Lieutenant to the 6th U.S. Cavalry stationed in Arizona. He served under General Willcox, General Crook, and General Miles during the Apache Wars. Resigning from the military in 1889, Blake moved to Grand Rapids, Michigan to become a businessman, as his wife and family wanted him to settle down. After about five years he soon found out that "'the tricks of the trade', were too deep for me" and giving into his desire for adventure, headed to South Africa as a gold prospector.

== Boer War ==
While in South Africa he became involved in the Second Boer War on the side of the South African Republic, leading the Chicago Irish-American Corps, known as Blake's Irish Brigade into battle against British forces. He returned to the United States after the war to a hero's welcome and toured on the lecture circuit. He subsequently published a memoir of his experience during the war, A West Pointer With The Boers.

== Family ==
John's mother Sinclair T. Chitty married his father Thomas Kincaid Blake Jr. at the age of 15. In 1885 John married Katherine Euphrasia Aldrich in Grand Rapids while still in the service. Together they lived in the officers' quarters at Fort Leavenworth, where John's first son Aldrich Blake was born on November 6, 1885. In 1888 Katherine, being pregnant with John's second son, persuaded him to resign from the military and return to Grand Rapids. He agreed, and on September 19, 1889, Ledyard Blake was born.

== Death ==
Blake was found dead in his home in Harlem, New York City of gas asphyxiation on January 24, 1907. He had previously been tending a sick friend for three days. Some sources said the death was accidental, while others called it suicide. He is buried at West Point, New York.

== See also ==
- Boer Foreign Volunteers
- Irish commandos
