= Portwest =

Irish multinational clothing and textiles company

- Type: Private
- Industry: Textiles
- Founded: 1904 in Westport, County Mayo, Ireland
- Founder: Charles Hughes
- Headquarters: Westport, Ireland
- Products: High Visibility Clothing; Flame Resistant Clothing; Workwear; Rainwear; Personal Protective Equipment; Head Protection; Safety Footwear; Safety Gloves
- Number of employees: 5,100
- Website: portwest.com

Portwest is a global clothing manufacturing company based in Westport, Ireland that specializes in the design and production of protective clothing, including high visibility, flame resistant workwear, safety footwear, work gloves and personal protective equipment (PPE).

Portwest was founded by Charles Hughes in 1904, in Westport. The Hughes family still own and manage the company. Portwest directly employs 5,100 people worldwide and sell to 10,000 safety distributors and national retailers in more than 130 countries. Portwest expanded its Australian operations through the acquisition of two Australian companies, Prime Mover and Huski Explorer. Portwest also invested in Italian company Base Protection footwear, a premium safety footwear brand.

== History ==
The origins of Portwest began in 1904 when Charles Hughes commenced his business as a small retail shop in Westport, County Mayo. Padraig Hughes, nephew of Charles Hughes, joined the business in 1936. After the death of his uncle in 1949, Padraig took over the running of the company until his retirement in 1988. For 52 years he oversaw the development of the wholesale business, the building of Hotel Westport, and the development of Westport Clothing company (now Portwest Ltd) and Carraig Donn Industries Ltd. The Hughes family still own and manage the company. The Hughes Group trading companies include: Charles Hughes Ltd, Hotel Westport Ltd. and Portwest Group. Portwest employees 5,100 people worldwide and sells to over 10,000 safety distributors and national retailers in more than 130 countries.

Today, Portwest has warehouses and sales offices in six global locations including UK, USA, Australia, UAE, Ireland and Poland.

== Products ==
Portwest specialises in the design and manufacture of workwear, protective clothing, gloves and personal protective equipment. The company has manufacturing facilities in Asia and customer support in 130 countries. Their products are used in a variety of industries including: oil and gas, mining and cement, service and hospitality, transportation, law enforcement, and security.
