= Niall McCormack =

Irish painter )

Niall McCormack (born in Castlebar, County Mayo, Ireland) is an Irish painter.

== Early life ==
McCormack is deaf from birth. He received his special education at Mary Immaculate School for Deaf Children run by the Daughters of the Cross of Liege in Stillorgan, South Dublin. Six years later, he transferred to Christian Brothers, St. Joseph's School for Deaf Boys, Cabra in North Dublin. He was one of the two first pupils to sit the Leaving Certificate examination.

He studied Architectural Drawing at Dublin Institute of Technology. He secured a place to study Art Foundation at Dun Laoghaire School of Art. He earned a NCEA certificate in Visual Education. McCormack studied Fine Art Painting at National College of Art and Design. He earned a NCAD diploma in Painting and a BA (Honors) degree. He was the first deaf student to study Fine Art at NCAD.

== Career ==
In 1988 McCormack taught deaf children art on a part-time basis at Mary Immaculate School for two years. He worked from his studio in Lower Ormond Quay.

In 2002 he was invited to have a solo exhibition at the Custom House Studios, Westport. He was the first artist to have an exhibition at the new Arts centre.

Since 2007, he has exhibited at RHA regularly. He had four solo exhibitions, in 2008, 2010, 2012, and 2015. In 2011, he had a solo exhibition at the Linenhall Arts Centre.

He is included in the dictionary of Living Irish Artists.

He currently lives and works in Westport, Co. Mayo. He has a tuxedo cat called Domino.

== Solo exhibitions ==
- 2015 – "Ocular Mantra", Molesworth Gallery, 16 Molesworth Street, Dublin 2
- 2012 – Castlebar, "New Work", Molesworth Gallery, 16 Molesworth Street, Dublin 2
- 2012 – Castlebar, "Exhibition of Portraits", Westport Arts Festival, Westport, Co. Mayo
- 2011 – Castlebar, "The Incidence of Light", The Linenhall Arts Centre, Castlebar, Co. Mayo
- 2010 – Castlebar,"Inside Out" Molesworth Gallery, 16 Molesworth Street, Dublin 2
- 2009 – Castlebar,Courthouse Gallery, Ennistymon, Co. Clare
- 2008 – Castlebar,"Gothic Pastel" Molesworth Gallery, 16 Molesworth Street, Dublin 2
- 2005 – Castlebar, Custom House Studios Gallery, Westport, Co. Mayo, Ireland
- 2002 – Castlebar, Custom House Studios Gallery, Westport, Co. Mayo, Ireland
- 1998 – Castlebar,Solo show, Diorama Art Gallery, London.

== Collections ==
- AXA Insurance
- Westport Town Council
- Mayo County Council
- DeafHear, Dublin
- University of Limerick
- Gallaudet University, Washington DC
- See Hear, BBC, London, England
- Leinster Society of Chartered Accountants, Dublin
- Mary Hare Grammar School, Newbury, Berkshire, England
- private collections in Ireland and abroad.
