= Custom House Studios and Gallery =

- Stiúideonna Theach an Chustaim, Cathair na Mart

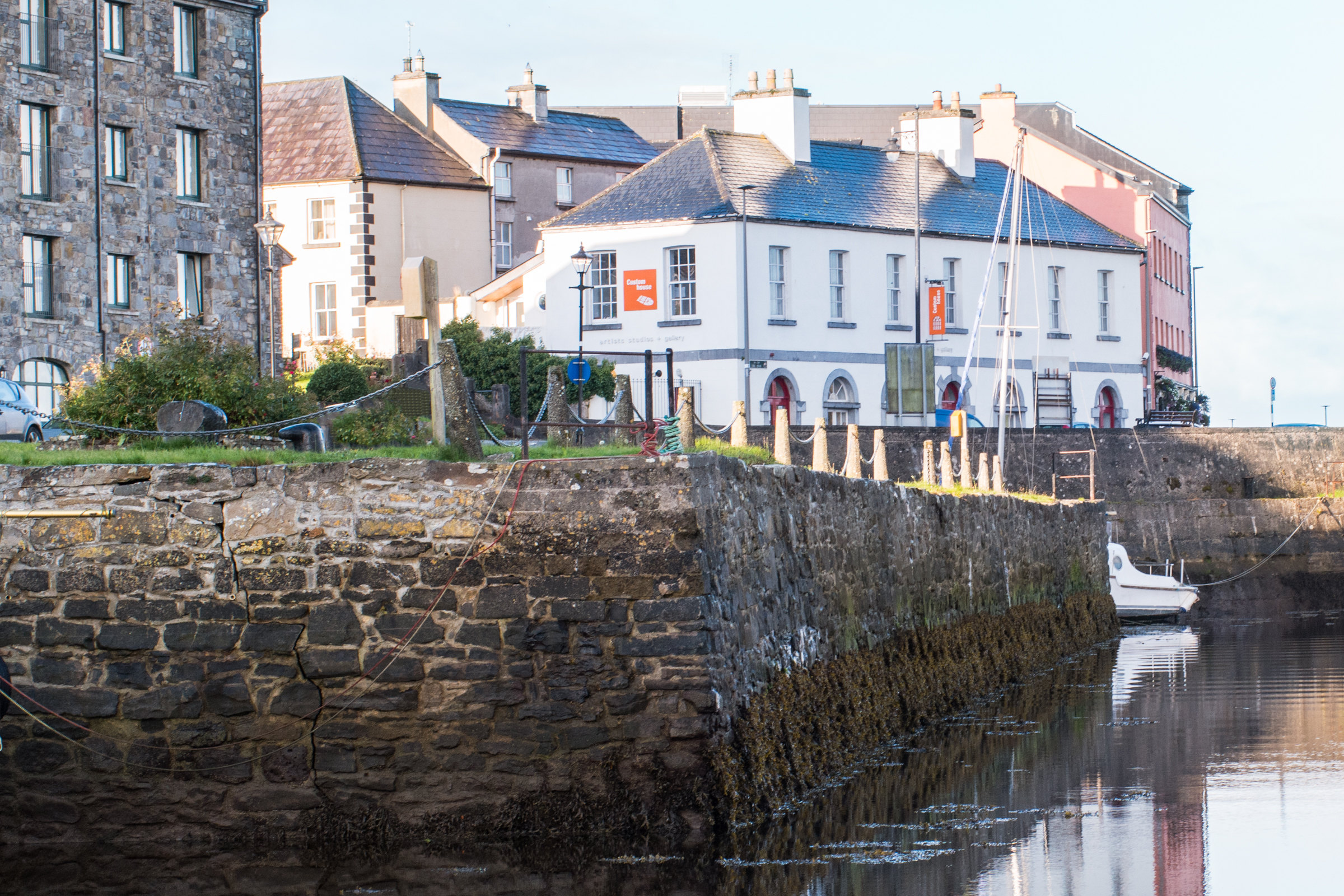
- View of the Custom House Studios and Gallery (white building) from the water

- Location within Ireland
- Established: 2002
- Location: 4 Castle Street, Westport, County Mayo, Ireland
- Coordinates: 53°48′01″N 9°32′50″W
- Type: art gallery
- Founder: Artists Group in Westport
- Architect: Dominick Madden (1820)
- Owner: Custom House Studios Ltd
- Public transit access: Westport; Mill Street bus stop (Westport)
- Website: customhousestudios.ie

The Custom House Studios and Gallery, also written Custom House Studios + Gallery, is an art gallery in Westport, County Mayo, Ireland.

It contains seven studios, a print room and a gallery, and is funded by Mayo County Council, Pobal, and the Arts Council of Ireland.

== History ==
The building was constructed as a customs house around 1820 to a design by Dublin architect Dominick Madden. It was described by Samuel Lewis in his topographical dictionary of Ireland in 1837 as being well arranged and having collected duties of £577 8 s. 4 d. in 1836.

It became obsolete and fell into ruin, being taken over and refurbished by local artists in 1999. The new Custom House Studios and Gallery opened on 26 November 2002.

Notable artists who have exhibited at the Custom House Studios and Gallery include Camille Souter, Mick O'Dea, Alison Pilkington, Niall McCormack and Alice Maher.
