= Westport, County Mayo =

Town in County Mayo, Ireland

Westport Cathair na Mart (Irish)
- Town
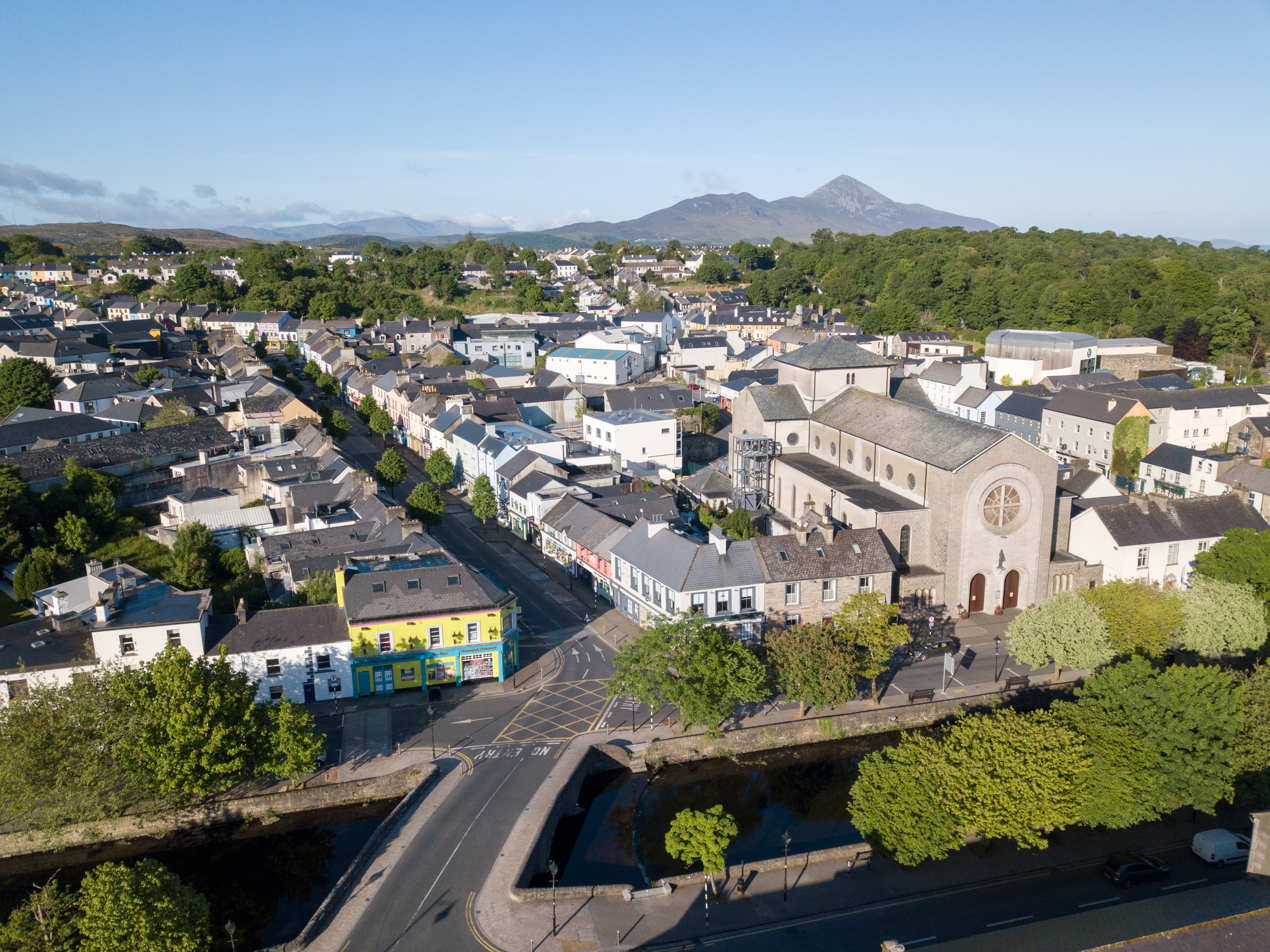
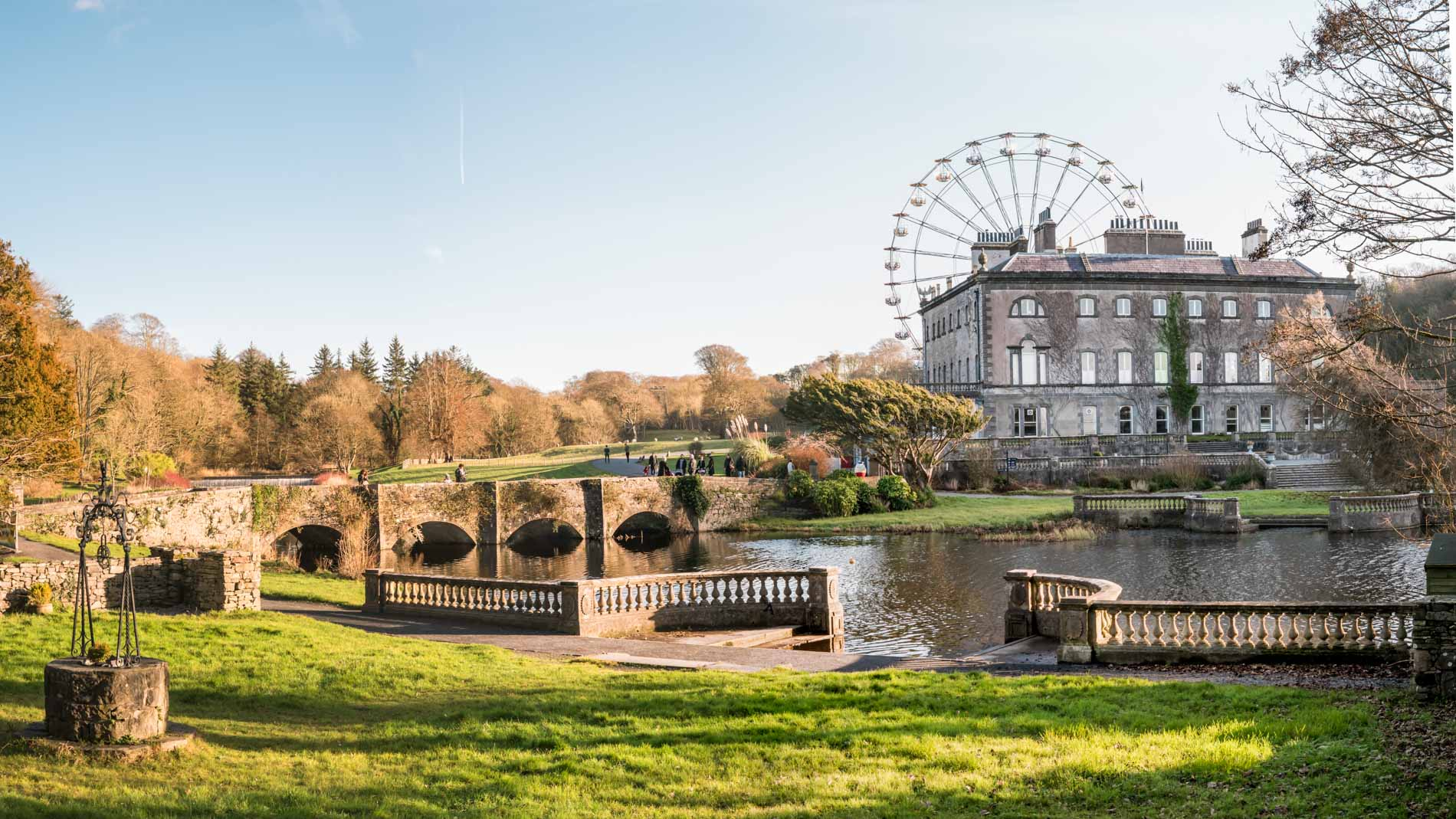
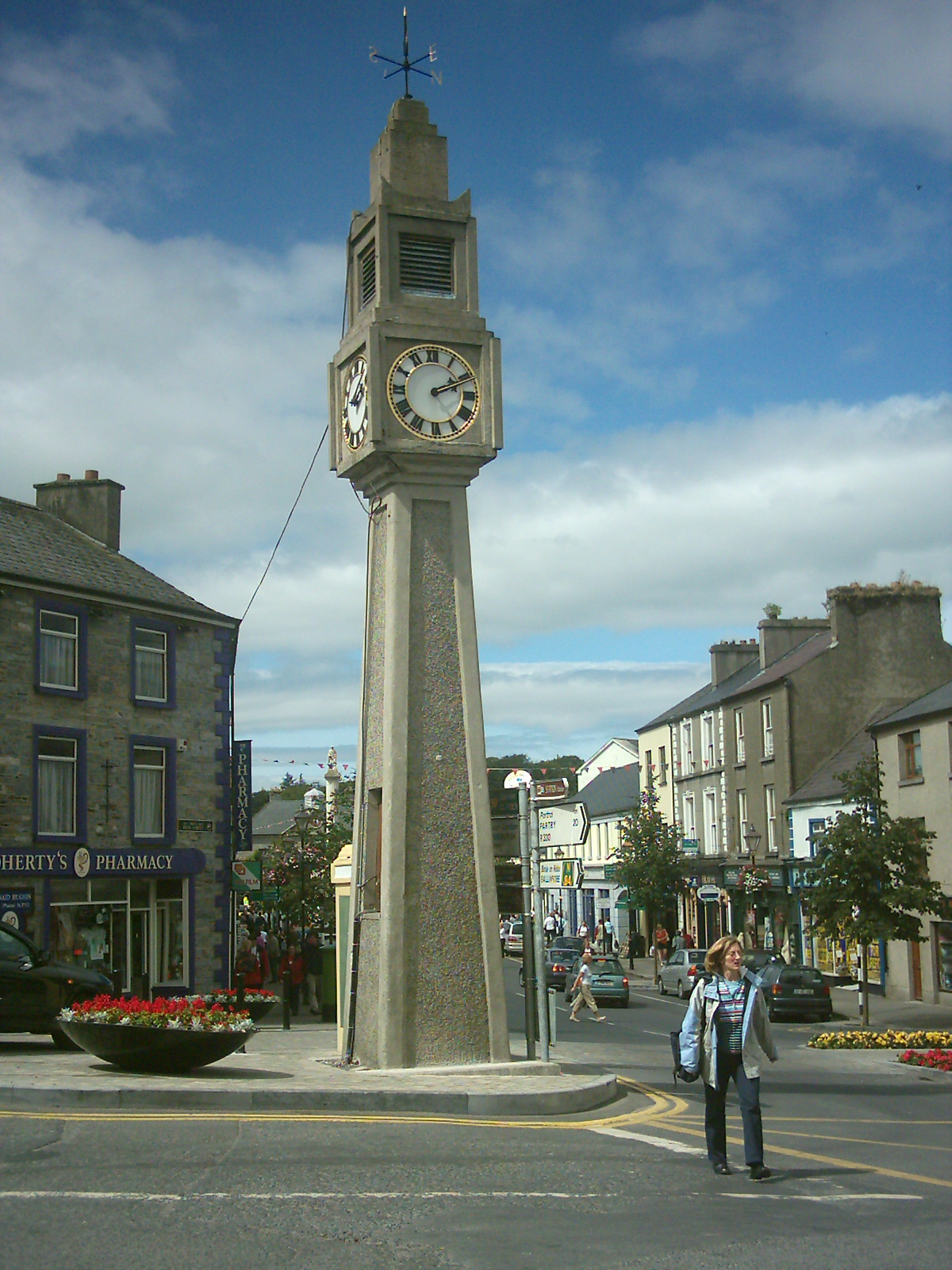
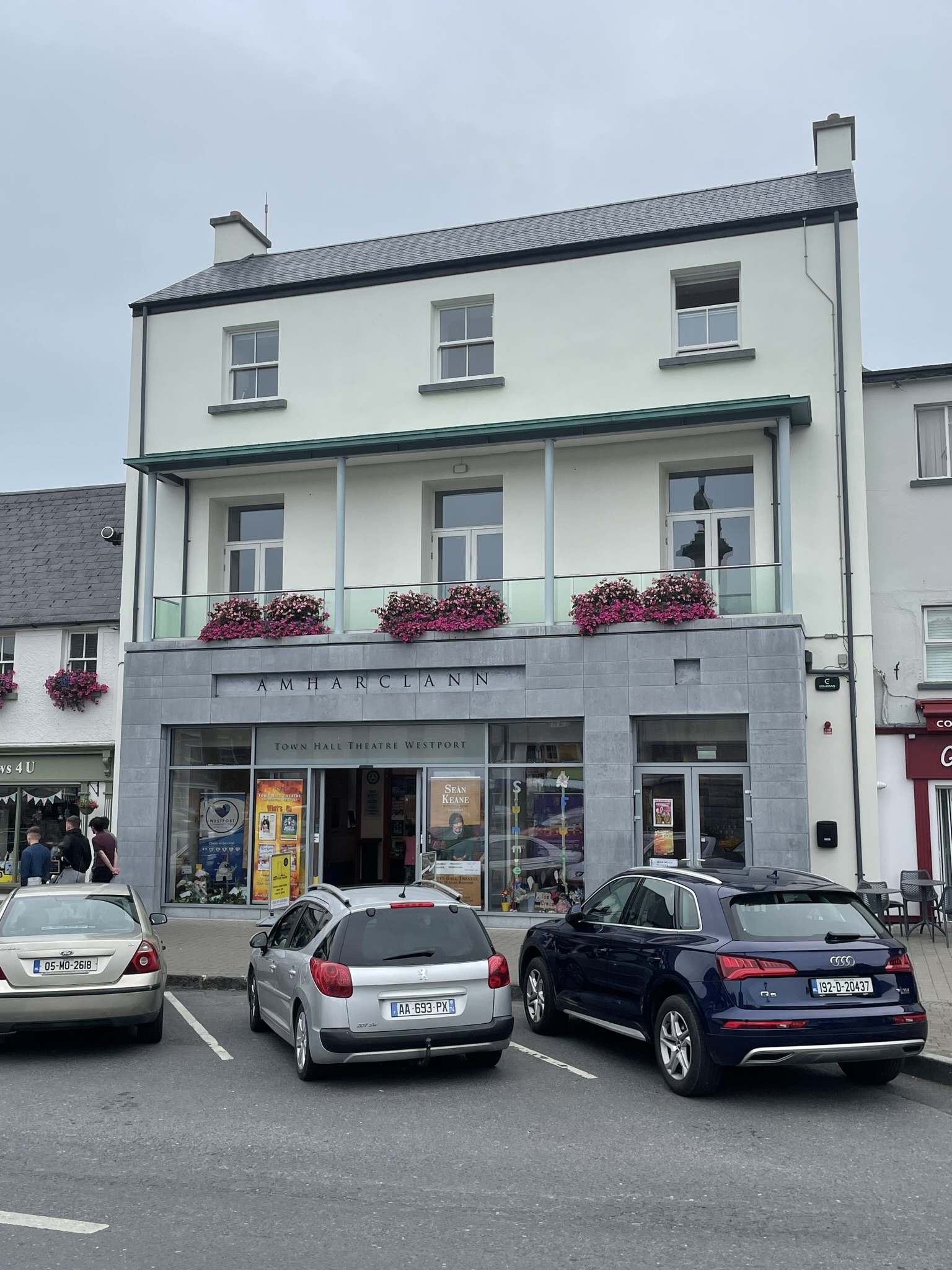
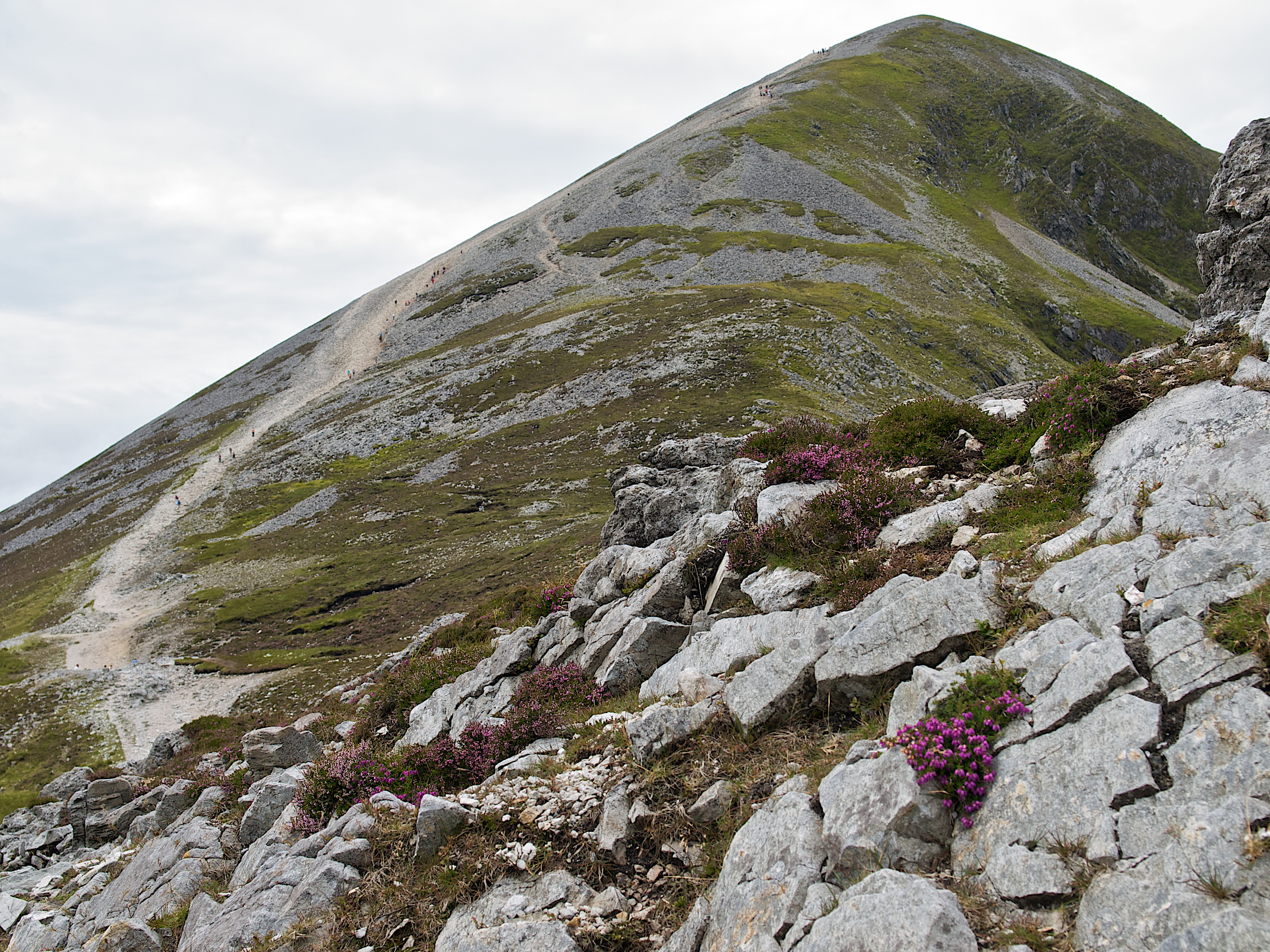
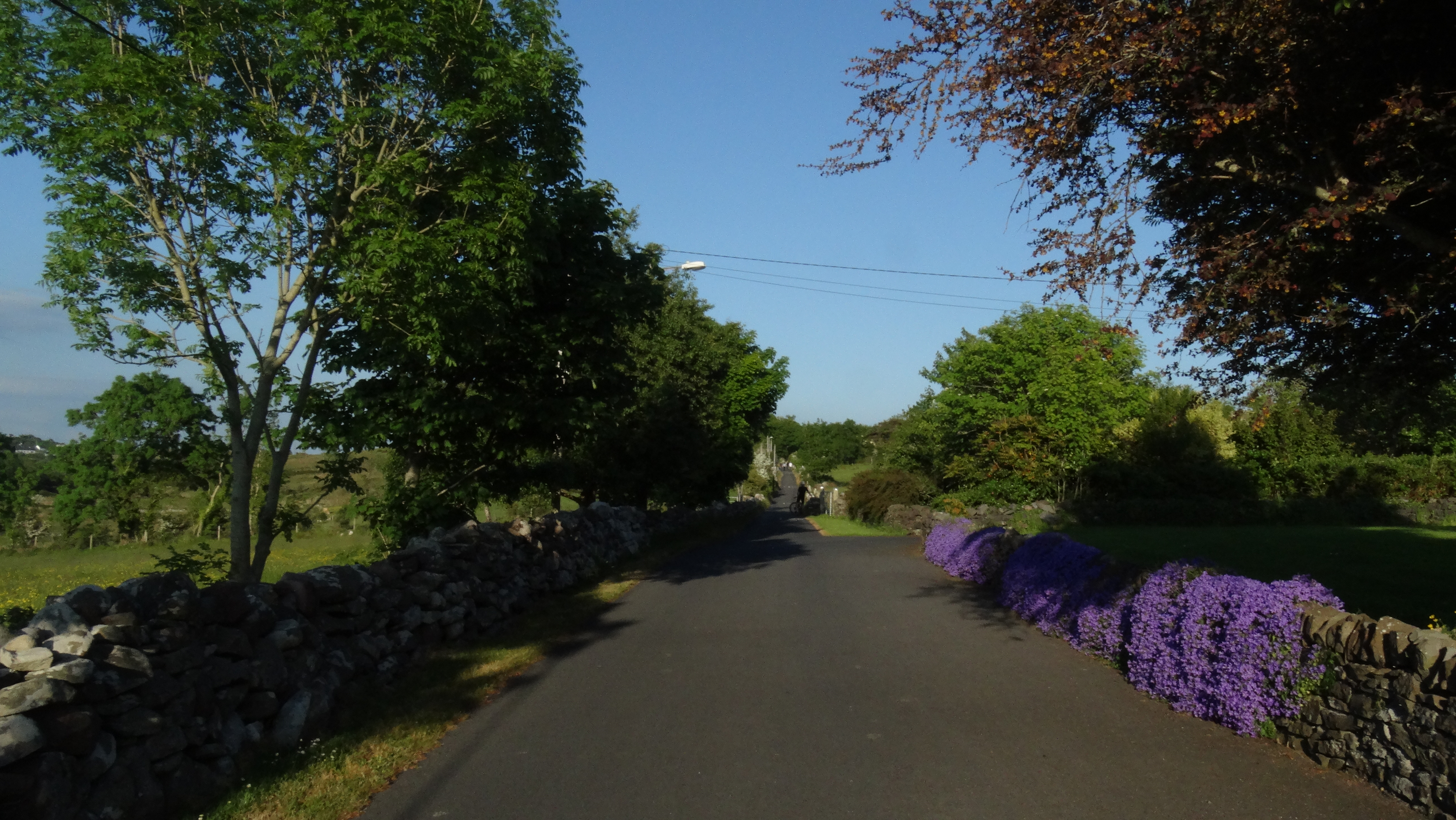
- Aerial shot of Westport Westport House Clocktower Westport Town Hall Theatre Pilgrims climbing Croagh Patrick Great Western Greenway

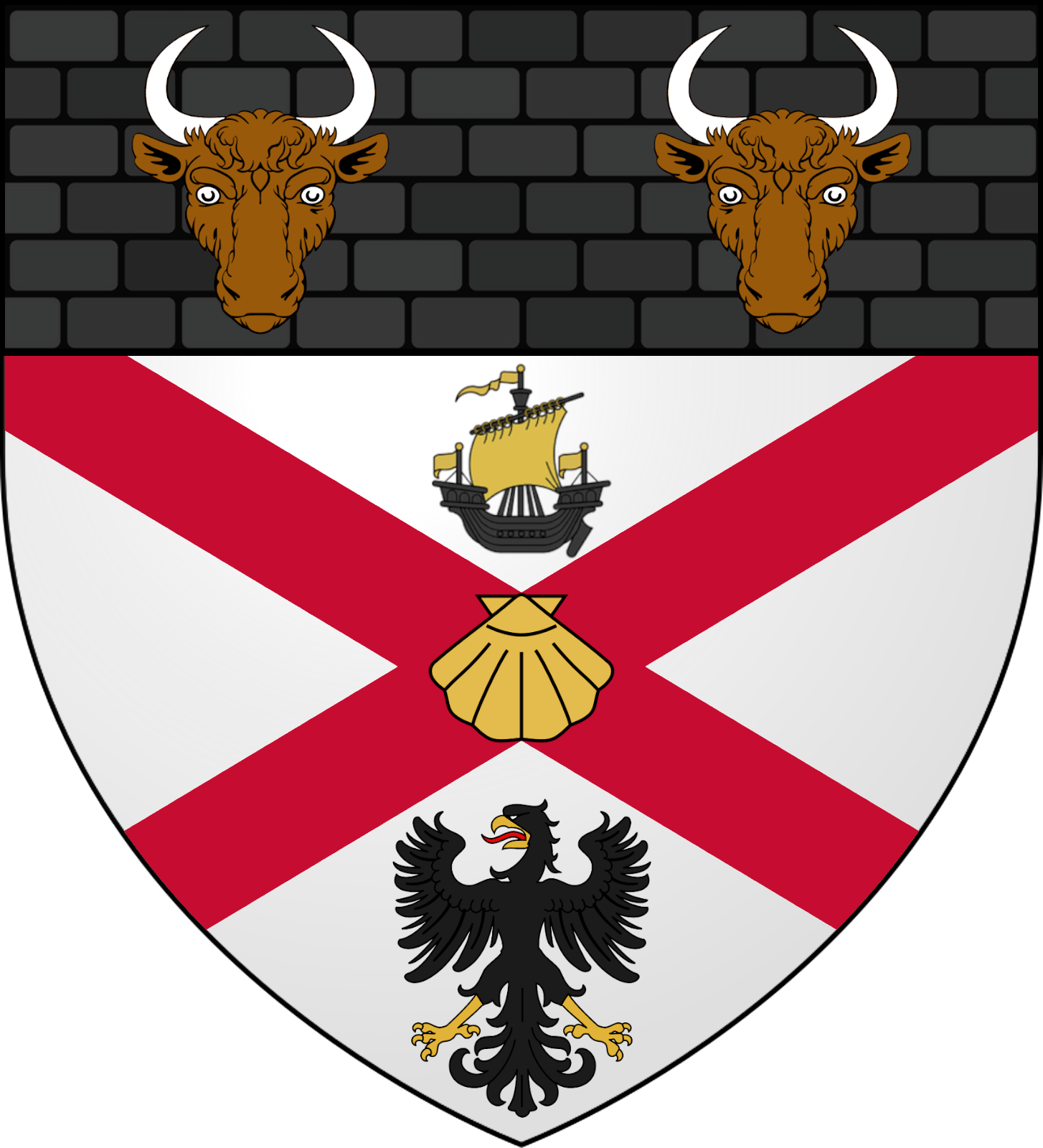
- Coat of arms

- Location in Ireland Westport (Europe)
- Coordinates: 53.8°N 9.5333°W
- Country: Ireland
- Province: Connacht
- County: County Mayo
- Elevation: 80 m (260 ft)

Population (2022)
  - Urban: 6,872
- Time zone: UTC±0 (WET)
  - Summer (DST): UTC+1 (IST)
- Eircode routing key: F28
- Telephone area code: +353(0)98
- Irish Grid Reference: M004841

Westport (Irish: Cathair na Mart, meaning 'the stone fort of the beeves', historically anglicised as Cahernamart) is a town in County Mayo in Ireland. It is at the south-east corner of Clew Bay, an inlet of the Atlantic Ocean on the west coast of Ireland. Westport is a tourist destination and scores highly for quality of life. It won the Irish Tidy Towns Competition three times in 2001, 2006 and 2008. In 2012 it won the Best Place to Live in Ireland competition run by The Irish Times.

Westport is designated as a heritage town, and is one of only a few planned towns in Ireland. The town centre was laid-out in the Georgian architectural style, and incorporates the Carrow Beg river into the design composition. This provides for tree lined promenades (known as The Mall) and several stone bridges.

The pilgrimage mountain of Croagh Patrick, known locally as "the Reek", lies some 10 km west of the town near the villages of Murrisk and Lecanvey. The mountain forms the backdrop to the town.

== History ==
=== Early origins and name ===
Westport originates and gets its name in the Irish language from a 16th-century castle, Cathair na Mart (meaning "the stone fort of the beeves"). The castle and surrounding settlement belonged to the powerful local seafaring Ó Máille clan, who controlled the Clew Bay area, then known as Umaill.

The original village of Cathair na Mart existed around what is now the front (east) lawn of Westport House. It had a high street, alleys down to the river and a population of around 700. A small port also existed at the mouth of the Carrowbeg river. Roads led from the village to the west (West Road), the south (Sandy Hill Road) and the east (Old Paddock Road).

=== Westport House and 18th-century beginnings ===
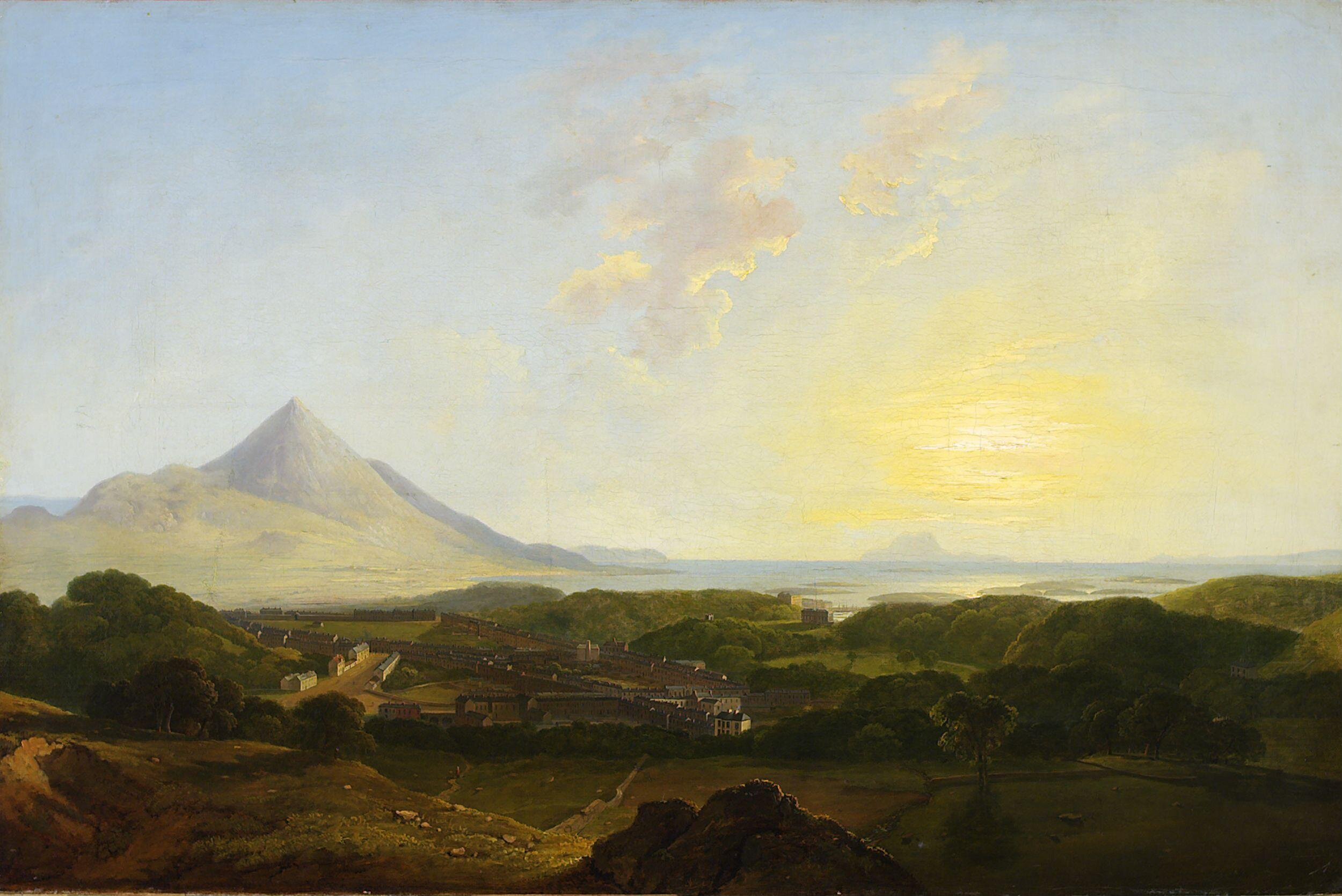
The town of Westport in the early nineteenth century, as painted by JA O'Connor. The main elements of the town are already in place.

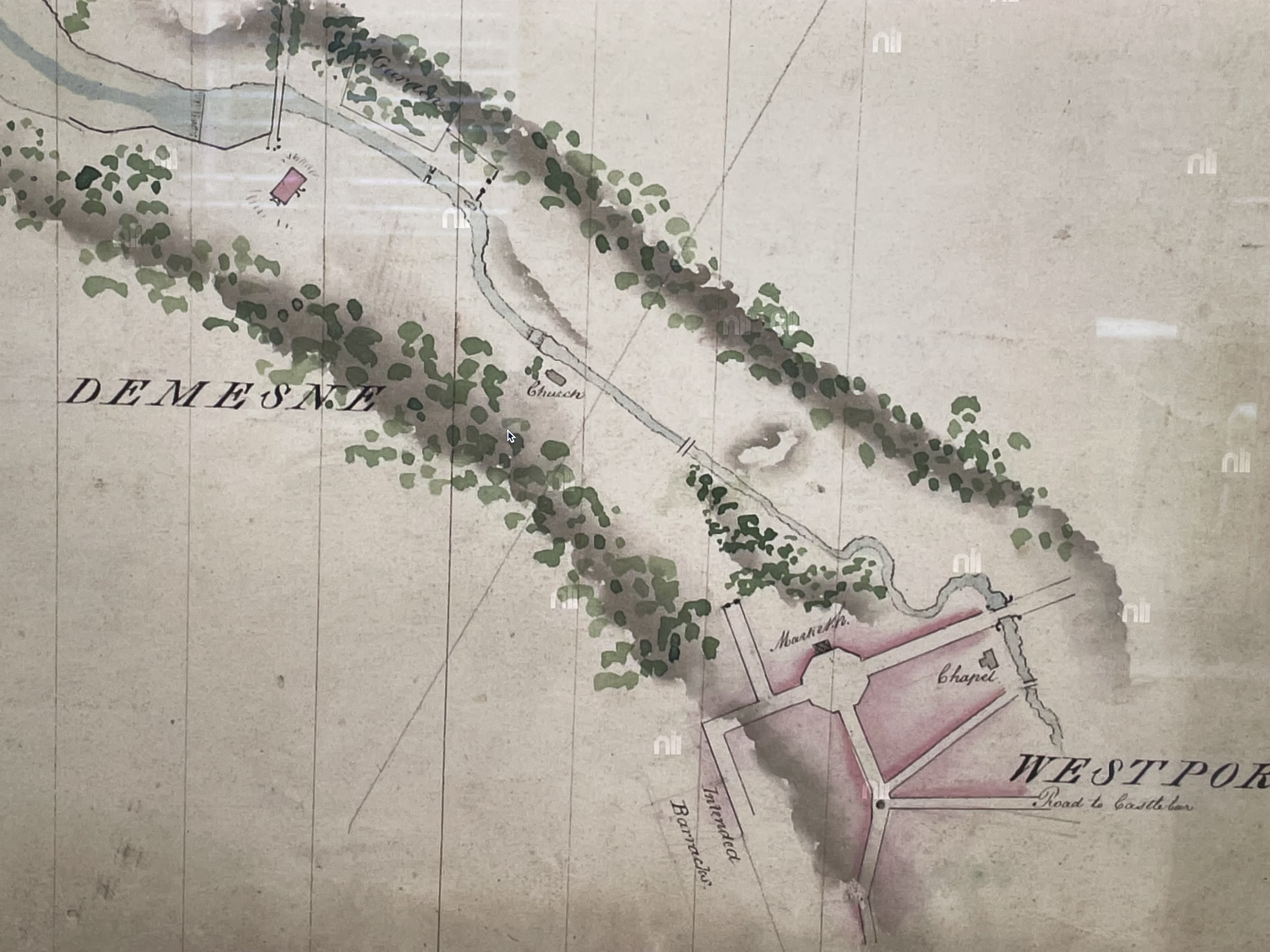
A map of the new town around 1790 showing the Octagon and earliest streets. The road to Castlebar is via Mill Street. The Market House, a Catholic Chapel in a similar location to today's St Mary's Church, and the old Church of Ireland (now in ruins) in the Demesne are shown.

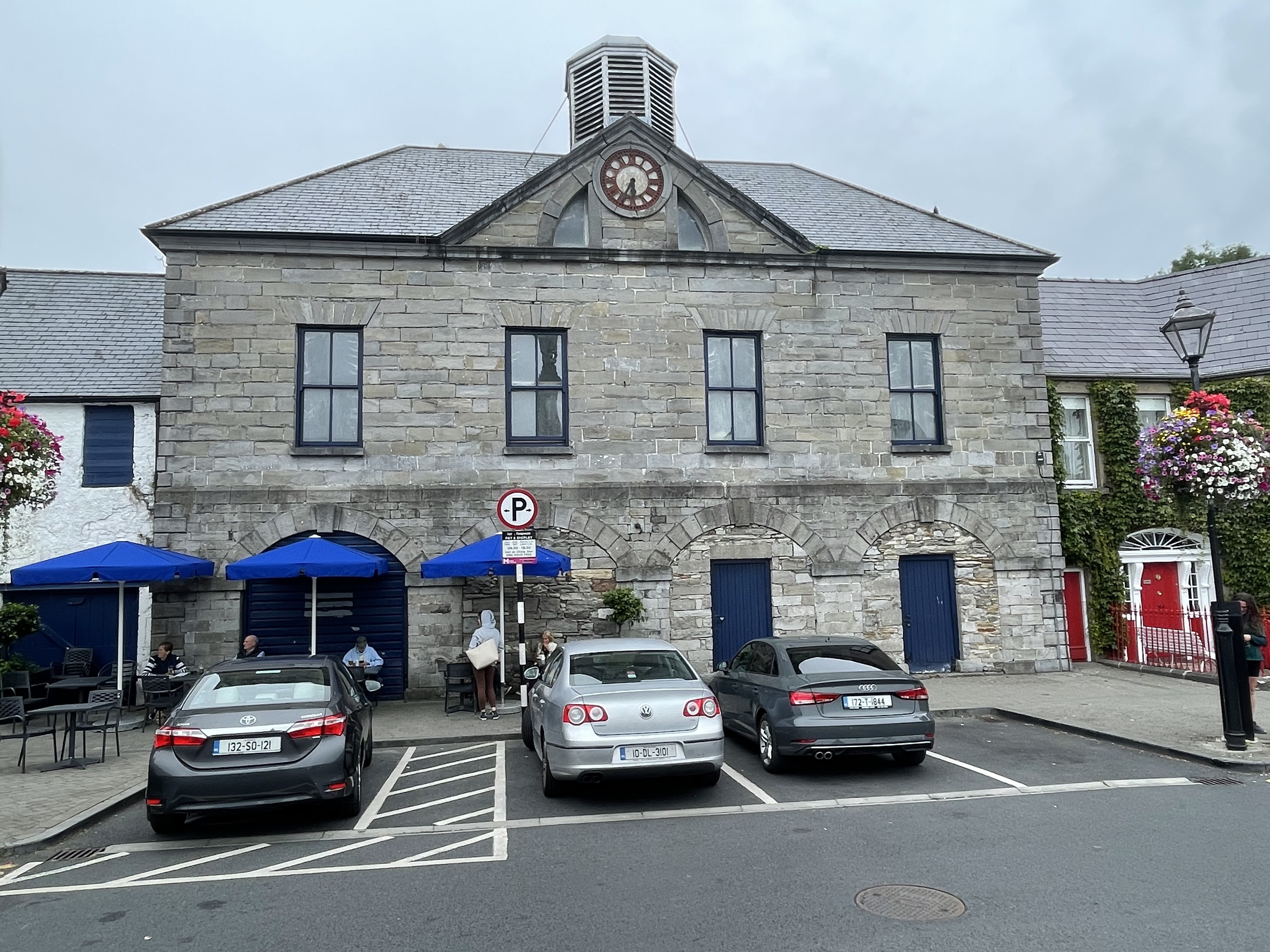
The Market House is one of the earliest buildings in Westport. Often attributed to James Wyatt, it was actually designed by William Leeson.

Westport's origins are tied to the Browne family. The Brownes were a noble family from Sussex, England, who arrived in Mayo in the 16th century and gradually acquired land around the county, particularly in the Westport area. Their position was strengthened in the later 17th century when Colonel John Browne, a Jacobite who had fought at the 1691 Siege of Limerick, married Maude Bourke, the great-great-granddaughter of regional soveign Grace O'Malley (Irish: Gráinne Ní Mháille), thereby inheriting rights to lands that had previously belonged to the Bourke and O’Malley families. Seeking to establish a grand residence that reflected their power, the Brownes constructed Westport House in the 18th century, initially built on the site of an Ó Máille castle at Cahernamart. The earliest version of the house stood without a lake or dam, with the tide rising and falling against its walls. From the 1730s onward, the estate was rebuilt and expanded, most notably under the direction of the German architect Richard Cassels, and later Thomas Ivory and James Wyatt. The finished house was set within parkland, with landscaped gardens, terraces, and a lake, symbolically asserting the Brownes’ authority in Mayo and anchoring the planned Georgian town of Westport that grew around the estate.

John Browne, 1st Earl of Altamont intended to move the existing Cahernamart settlement to facilitate landscaping of parklands around Westport House; this intention was outlined to Richard Pococke when he visited Browne in 1752.

The first clear evidence for the deliberate development of a new town is an advertisement in Faulkner's Dublin Journal on 17 March 1767, stating "a New Town is immediately to be built near the old town of Westport...according to Plans and Elevations already prepared". The focal point was to be a "large and elegant market house" situated in an octagonal market area enclosed by 12 "large well-finished slated Houses". There were to be "three avenues for streets of thirty slated Houses" and "several very large streets for great numbers of thatched Houses and cabbins, to be built separately" at a cost of 20–40 guineas each. Workmen were to contact Peter Brown-Kelly, son of the Earl, or the architect William Leeson.

In 1778 Peter Browne, 2nd Earl of Altamont engaged James Wyatt (1746–1813) to redesign parts of Westport House, including its dining room. This engagement fostered a lasting belief that Wyatt was the town's designer, but work on the town was already well advanced when Wyatt began work. If he had any design input into the town project it could only have been to later stages such as the Malls.

Peter Browne, 2nd Earl of Altamont acquired slave plantations in Jamaica by marriage. His grandson Howe Peter Browne (2nd Marquess of Sligo) was Governor of Jamaica when the slaves were freed. This connection to plantation slavery is documented in later historiography.

=== 19th-century townscape and mapping ===
The town's street plan follows medieval principles of urban design introduced by the Normans in the 13th century, with a particular emphasis on the incorporation of the river into the composition. Low stone walls contain the river for two blocks and produce, on each side, tree-lined promenades (The Mall) with several stone bridges over the river Carrow Beg. The Malls were constructed by the First Marquess of Sligo after 1800. William Bald's map of Mayo, surveyed between 1809 and 1817, and Henry Browne's map from the same period, show that the basic framework of Westport's streets, including the Malls, was present by the early 19th century.

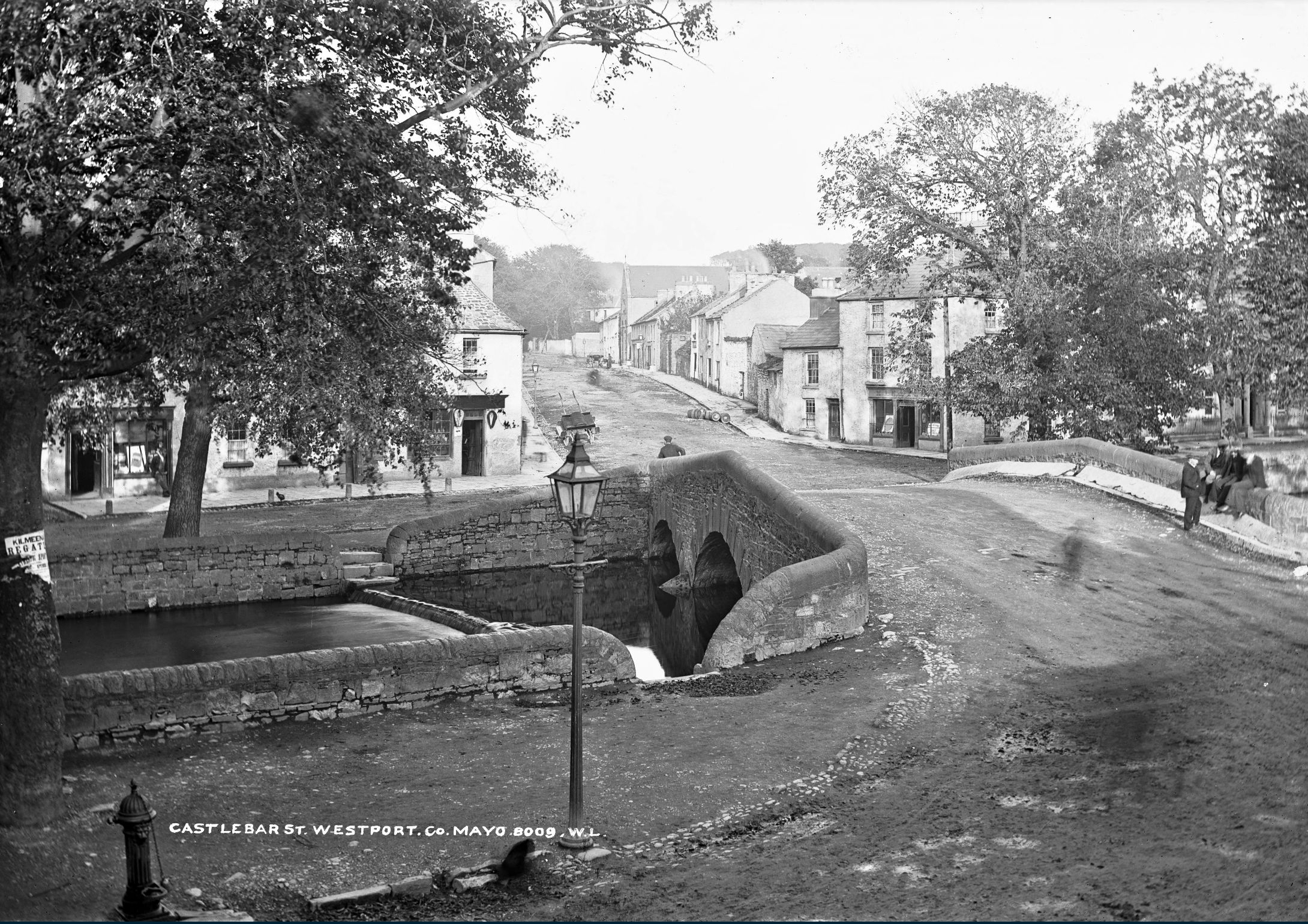
Bottom of Bridge street, looking towards Castlebar street, circa 1880s

Westport is designated as a heritage town and is unusual in Ireland in that it is one of only a few planned towns in the country. The original architectonic plans for the town, however, are not available.

=== Revolutionary period (1916 to 1922) ===
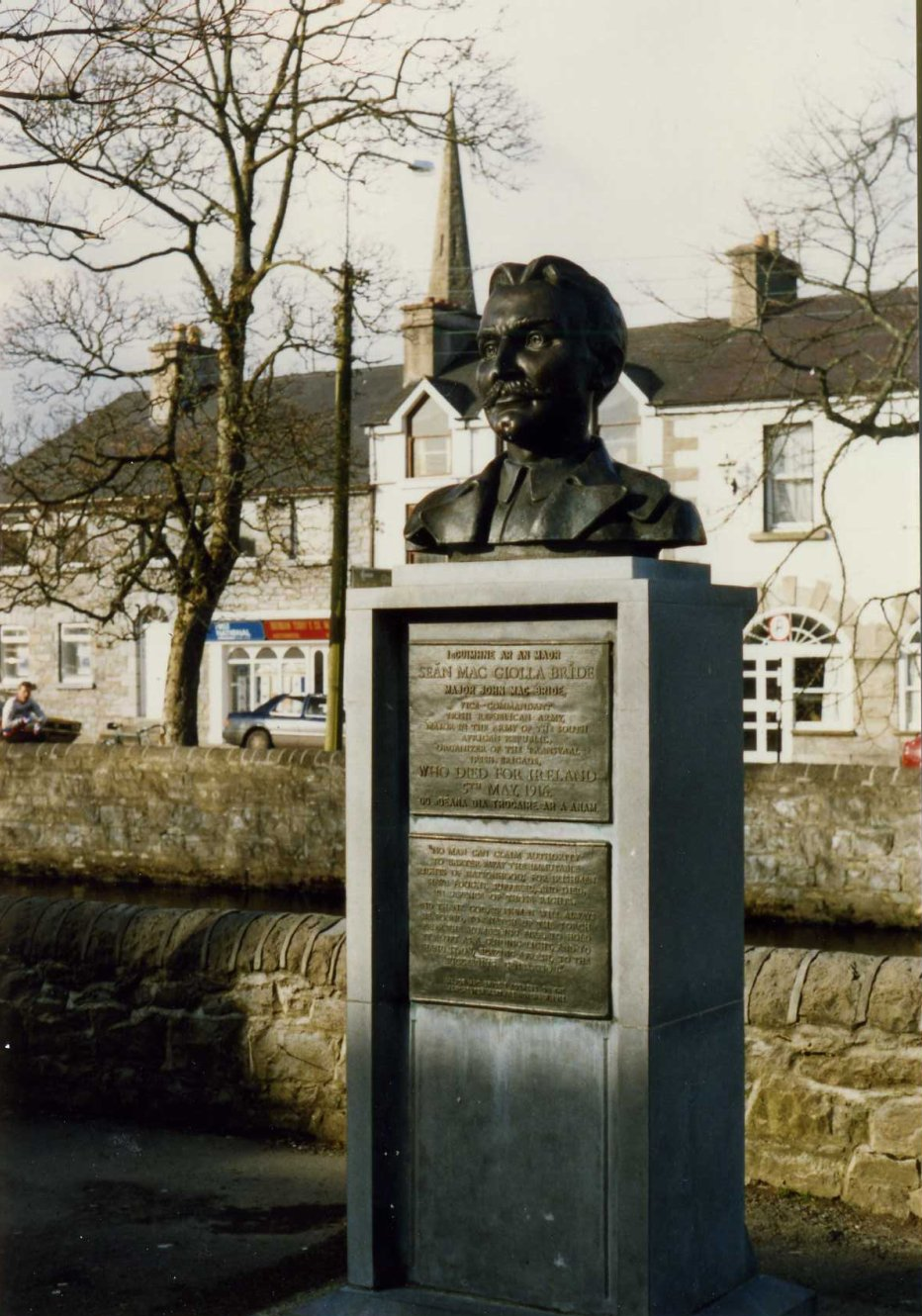
A local bust dedicated to Westport's John MacBride, who was second-in-command in the 1916 Easter Rising.

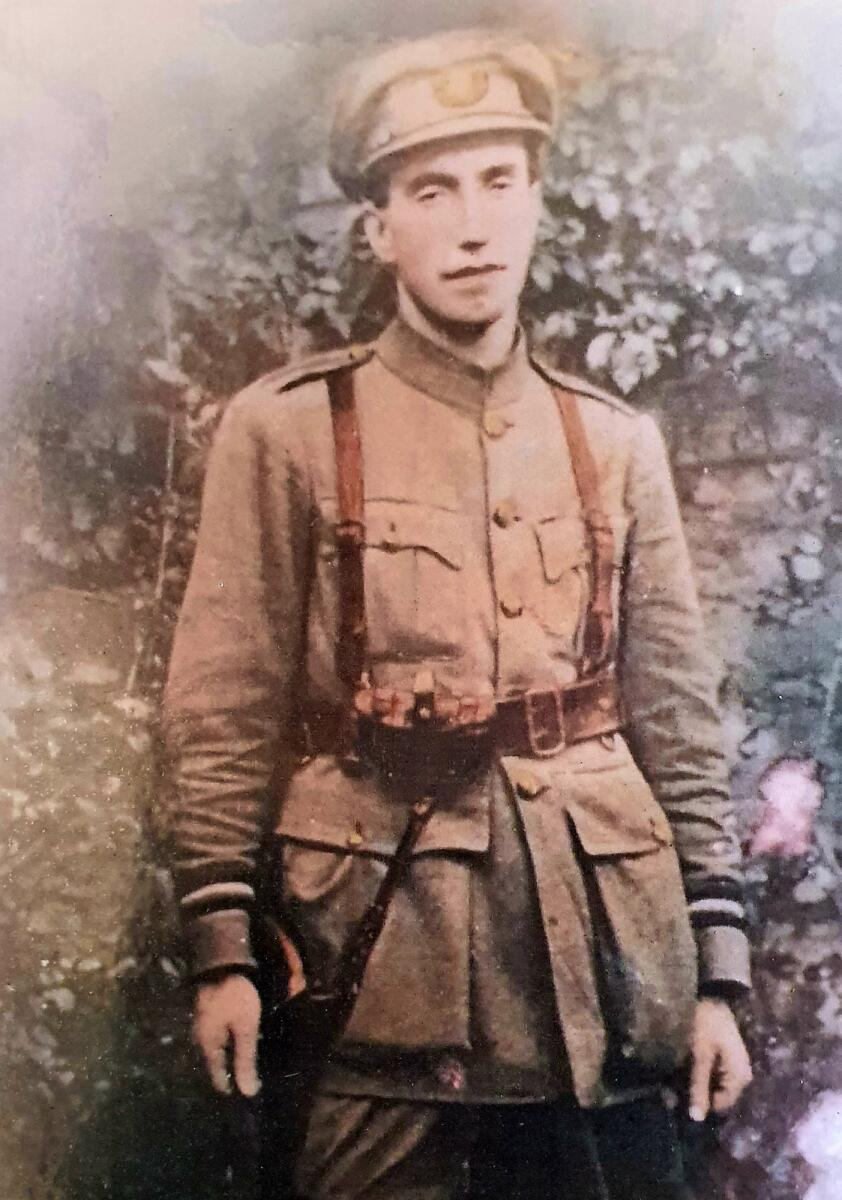
Brigadier General Joe Ring, from Drumindoo, Westport, captured Rosmoney Coastguard Station and took part in the seaborne capture of Westport by the new National Army in 1922. He was killed on 24th September 1922 in the Battle of the Ox Mountains.

In 1916, Westport's John MacBride became unexpectedly involved in the Easter Rising when, while visiting Dublin for his brother’s wedding, he encountered Thomas MacDonagh and offered his services. He was soon appointed second-in-command of the Irish Volunteers at Jacob’s Biscuit Factory, where he directed men in defending the position. After the surrender, he was court-martialled and executed by firing squad at Kilmainham Gaol on 5 May 1916, refusing a blindfold and facing death defiantly. His execution sent shockwaves back to Westport and it helped to radicalise opinion in the town, with dozens of local Volunteers later arrested and interned in Britain during the revolutionary period.

After the Easter Rising of 1916, in Westport over 30 Irish Volunteers and Sinn Féin supporters were arrested by the RIC under the Defence of the Realm Act 1914 on the orders of resident magistrate John Charles Milling and the local District Inspector, Shore. Those arrested included Joe Ring, Tom Derrig and PJ Doris, editor of the Mayo News; they were sent to Frongoch internment camp in Wales. Joe Ring and others were released at Christmas 1916.

On 29 March 1919, Milling, resident magistrate to County Mayo since 1915, was killed by the Irish Republican Brotherhood (IRB) at his home on Newport Road, Westport.

During the Irish War of Independence, on 26 March 1921, following the killing of a constable by the IRA four days earlier, the Westport RIC left their barracks to punish the town and surrounding area. Homes and businesses of IRA families were targeted. The home and business of Charles Hughes, chairman of the Urban District Council, was destroyed, as was the pub and shop of Thaddeus Walsh, chairman of the Rural District Council. Other houses in the town and houses in Carrowkennedy, Drummindoo and Carrowbawn were destroyed or burned.

A company of the Auxiliary Division of the Royal Irish Constabulary were based in Westport from June 1921.

Following the Anglo-Irish Treaty, the Royal Irish Constabulary pulled out of their barracks for the last time on Monday 12 February 1922 and formally handed the barracks over the next day.

==== Civil War ====
Early in the Irish Civil War, Mayo, including Westport, was controlled by the Anti-Treaty side. On the evening of 1 April 1922, Joe Ring was arrested in Westport by the IRA and held in Castlebar jail on charges of recruiting for the new National Army; he went on hunger strike and was released on 13 April, receiving a hero's welcome in Westport.

A cross-channel ferry, the SS Minerva, was kitted out as a troop carrier by the National Army and left North Wall, Dublin on 22 July, sailing around Ireland and arriving in Clew Bay on 24 July 1922. Col. Comdt. Christopher ('Kit') O'Malley from the Dublin Guard was in command and accompanied by Brigadier-General Joe Ring. The Minerva carried 400 troops and a Rolls-Royce 1920-pattern armoured car, nicknamed the Big Fella, with a Vickers machine gun and an 18-pounder artillery piece, as well as 600 rifles and 150 bicycles. It anchored off Inishlyre. General Ring led a landing by sea. The Coastguard station at Rosmoney was captured by 40 National Army troops, freeing 90 pro-treaty prisoners who were held there. Ring then landed his men and armoured car at Westport Quay. Republicans, who had not expected their arrival, set fire to the barracks and withdrew from the town. The pro-treaty forces were stationed at Westport Town Hall, where troops billeted there shot off the head of the Glendenning statue.

=== Mid to late 20th century ===
The 1920s and 1930s saw important transport shifts. The train line to Achill, which had connected western communities to Westport, was progressively reduced and finally closed in 1937; the loss was part of a shift to wider transfer of goods and passengers from rail to road.

In 1960, Westport House opened to the public as a heritage and visitor attraction. It marked a major shift in the Westport economy towards the tourism sector.

In 1977, the pharmaceutical company Allergan established a plant in Westport, becoming one of the company’s largest global manufacturing and research facilities. The site initially specialised in producing eye-care products, and in 1993 it began manufacturing Botox. Over the following decades, the plant expanded several times, becoming a cornerstone of Westport’s economy and one of the largest employers in the west of Ireland.

Since the late 20th century, Westport has expanded with several new housing estates. These include Springfield, the Carrowbeg Estate, Horkans Hill, Cedar Park, Fairways, Knockranny Village and Sharkey Hill.

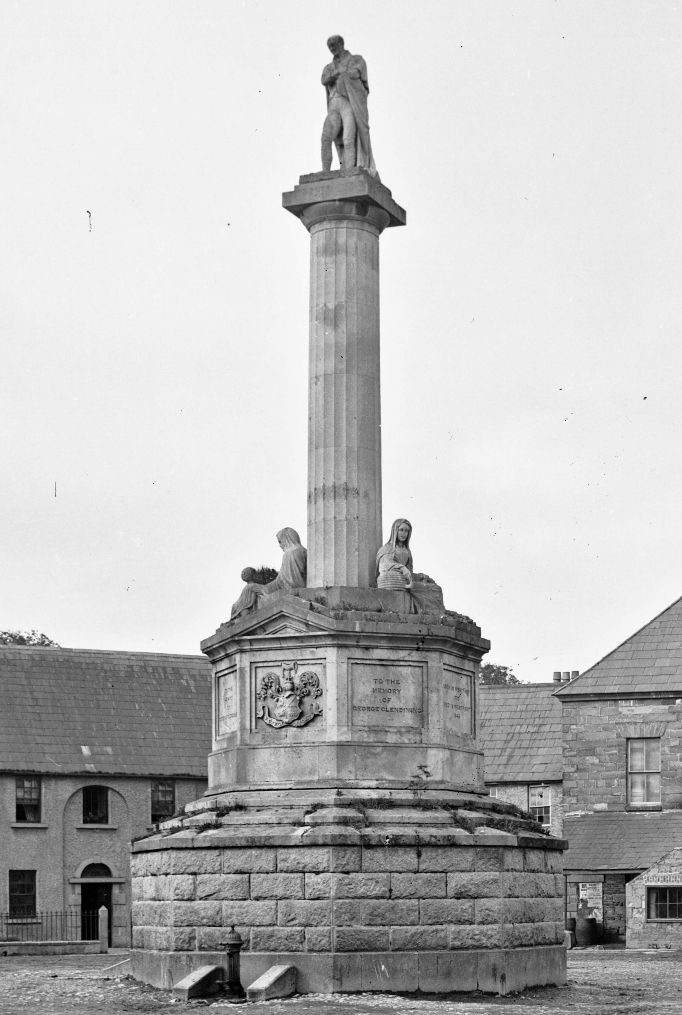
The original version of the momentum, which paid homage to banker George Glendenning.

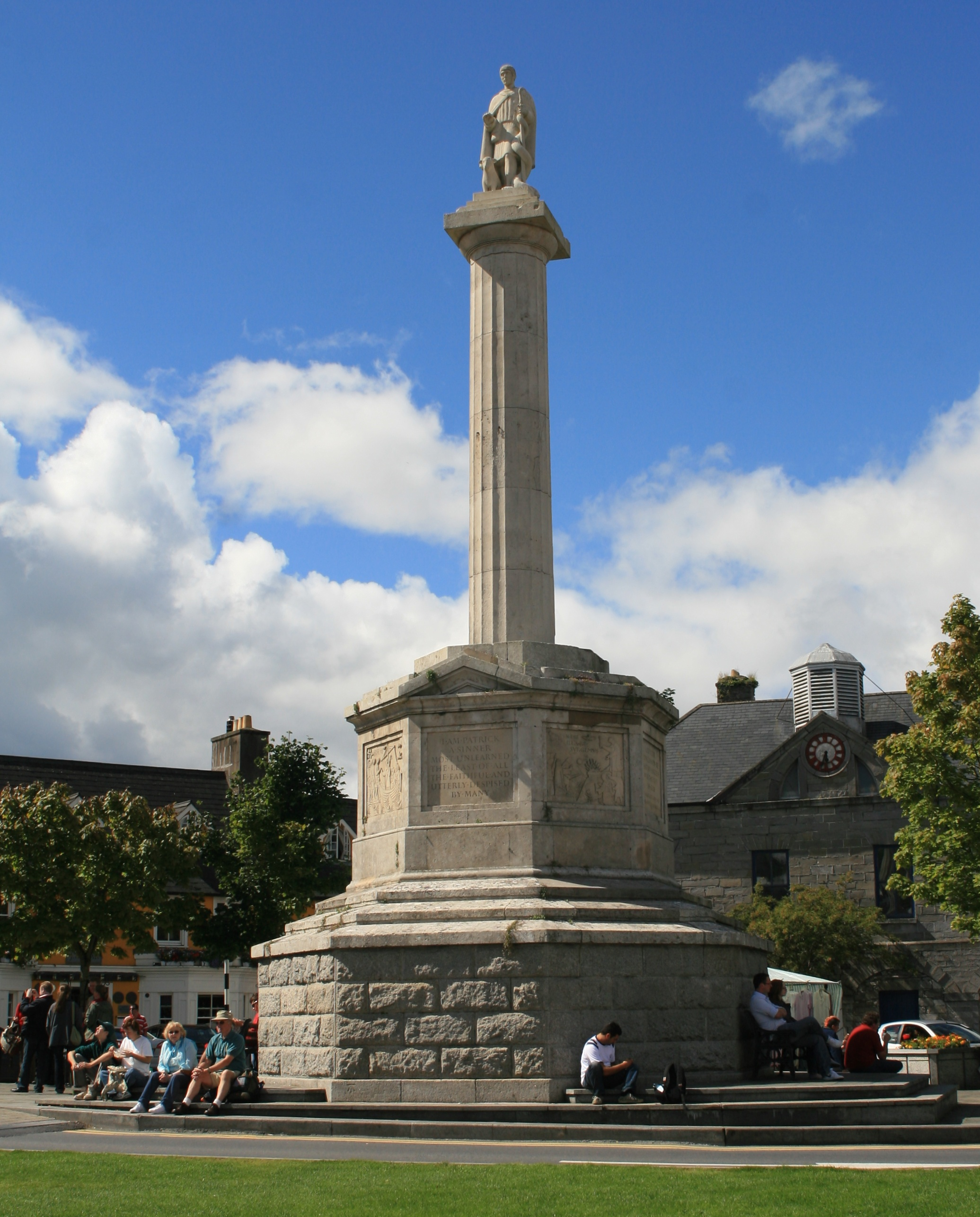
The modern monument, now in tribute to Saint Patrick. Glendenning, the desolate Irish women, and coat of arms were removed over the course of the 20th century and replaced.

In 1990, the long-empty Glendenning Monument at the Octogon was restored and topped with a new statue of Saint Patrick, returning the column to prominence. The monument had originally been erected in 1845 to commemorate George Glendenning, a wealthy banker and land agent, reportedly because he left money in his will for its construction. Known locally as "Big George," the statue was damaged during the Civil War when Free State troops used its head for target practice. The broken figure had remained in place until 1943, when the local council removed it along with the coat of arms and inscriptions.

=== 21st century ===
Approaching the year 2000, Westport, which had previously experienced high vacancy rates and limited population growth, underwent a regeneration process shaped by a long-term town plan led by Mayo County Council architect Simon Wall. Rather than focusing on short-term or symbolic projects, the council developed a 20–30 year design framework intended to provide certainty for developers and guide local authorities in managing growth. The plan introduced measures such as coordinated colour schemes, restoration of historic features, and encouragement of residential use in the town centre, which collectively contributed to reversing suburban drift and increasing town-centre activity. In 2000, facilities at Croagh Patrick were upgraded with the opening of a visitor centre and associated path works, improving access for both pilgrims and leisure walkers. By the 2010s, Westport recorded one of the lowest vacancy rates in Mayo, along with population growth during the national recession and increased inward investment, including over 1,000 jobs at Allergan. In 2011, the Great Western Greenway, a 42 km route along the former Westport-to-Achill railway, was officially opened, transforming the disused corridor into Ireland’s longest coastal greenway at the time and contributing to tourism and local economic activity around Clew Bay. Additional improvements to streetscapes, parking, and public spaces enhanced the town’s quality of life, while tourism development was supported through events and the promotion of Westport as an adventure destination. In 2012, the town was named the Best Place to Live in Ireland, and further investment, including the €50 million redevelopment of Westport House, reinforced its position as a key tourism hub.

In 2014, Westport Urban District was disbanded in June 2014 alongside all other Town councils in Ireland as part of the Local Government Reform Act 2014.

In 2017, Westport House and its 455-acre estate were sold by the Browne family to Mayo-based Hotel Westport Ltd, owned by the Hughes family, in a deal involving an investment plan of up to €50 million. The estate, valued at €10 million and burdened with €1 million in debt, attracted international interest before the Hughes brothers secured the purchase, with negotiations beginning just before Christmas 2016. The Hughes family, who also operate the Hotel Westport and the Portwest clothing firm, pledged to create 200 jobs over five years and to transform the house into a leading tourist attraction while maintaining normal operations for staff and visitors. The sale was described as emotional by the Browne family, who had struggled with debt since the 2008 recession, while political figures welcomed the move as safeguarding the estate from potential vulture fund acquisition.

In 2020, the COVID-19 pandemic abruptly reduced overseas tourism and international visitor flows, exposing Westport’s seasonal vulnerabilities and the risks of dependency on international air and coach markets; like many Irish towns, Westport responded by leaning more heavily on domestic staycations, outdoor assets and dispersed experiences. Due to Westport's access to outdoor activities, such as Westport House's outdoor areas, the Great Greenway, Croagh Patrick, and Achill Island, Westport served as one of the largest destinations for Irish staycationers in 2021 and 2022, becoming a boomtown in the summer months.

Following the 2022 Russian invasion of Ukraine, Westport welcomed hundreds of Ukrainian refugees into local hotels and community facilities under the State’s emergency accommodation programme. Hotel Westport and other properties were taken over to provide temporary shelter, and by early 2024, an estimated 1,303 people had been settled in and around the town. This influx meant that Mayo, and Westport in particular, hosted one of the highest proportions of Ukrainian refugees per capita in Ireland, a concentration that had effects on tourism capacity, housing demand and local services. While the loss of hotel beds to the leisure market created difficulties for Westport’s tourism-dependent economy, the community response was generally supportive, with volunteers, schools and civic groups mobilising to provide language classes, integration supports and day-to-day assistance.

== Economy ==
AbbVie, a global biopharmaceutical company, employs 1,400 people in Westport As of 2020, covering 1/4 of the workforce. AbbVie acquired Irish company Allergan in 2020. The clothing manufacturing company and family business Portwest is based in Westport and was founded there in 1904.

=== Tourism ===
A Midland Great Western Railway bus in front of the Railway Hotel on North Mall (N59)

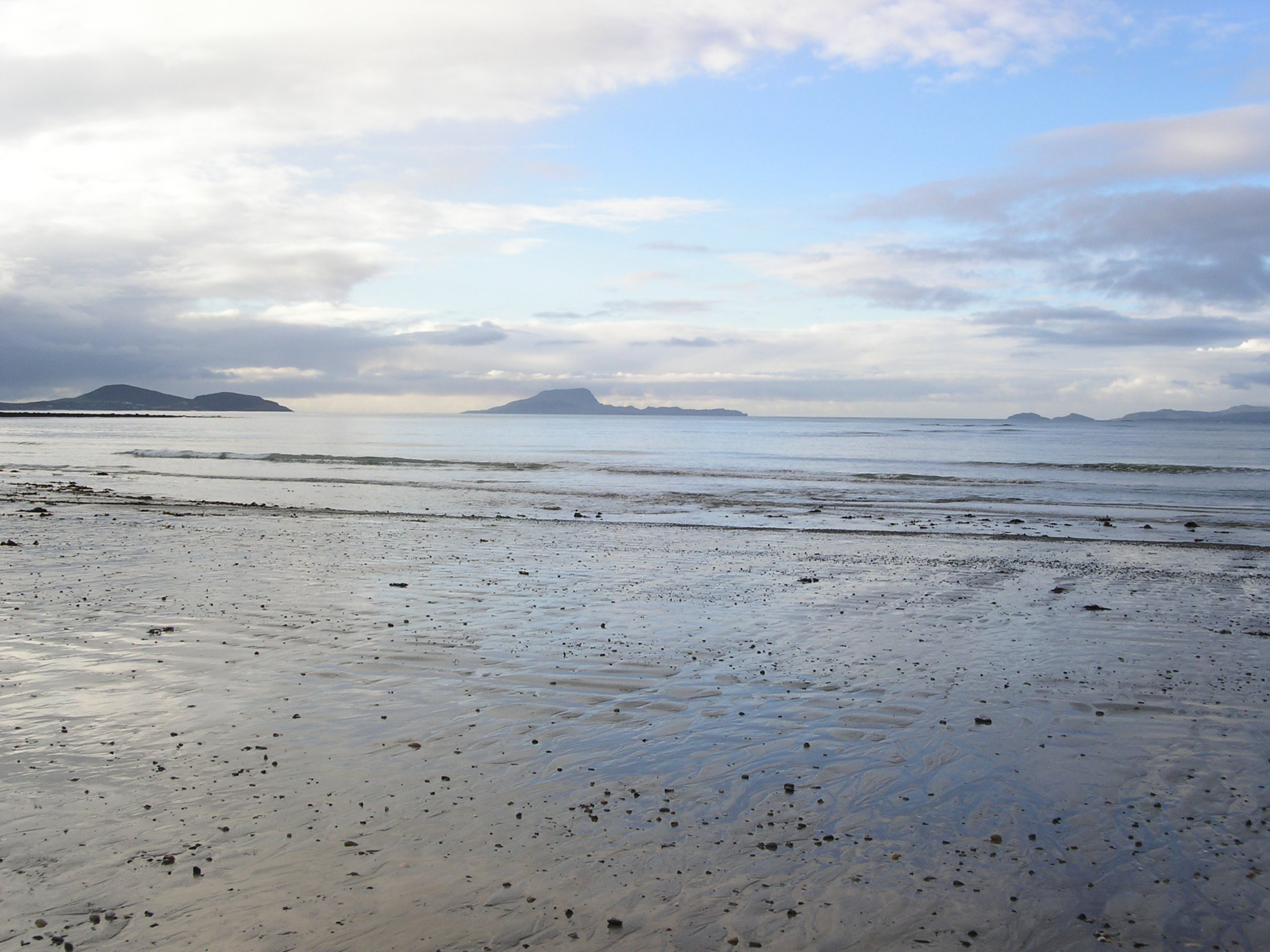
Clew Bay with Clare Island

Westport is County Mayo's premier tourist destination, visited by holidaymakers from all over the world and Ireland.

In 1842, the English novelist, William Makepeace Thackeray, visited Westport and wrote of the town:

"The most beautiful view I ever saw in the world. It forms an event in one's life to have seen that place so beautiful that is it, and so unlike other beauties that I know of. Were such beauties lying on English shores it would be a world's wonder perhaps, if it were on the Mediterranean or Baltic, English travellers would flock to it by hundreds, why not come and see it in Ireland!"

Visitors visit Westport for the scenery, the pubs and restaurants in the town, blue flag beaches, and Croagh Patrick. Its proximity to Connemara, Achill, Clew Bay and Croagh Patrick, and its hotels and guest houses, make it a base for holidaymakers to tour the region.

In January 2008, Westport became Google Earth's first fully 3D town.

In 2014, the Irish Examiner called Westport the "Stag and Hen party capital of Ireland", and noted that Galway City was eager to attempt to wrestle away that same business.

In 2020, Peter Hynes, the chief executive of Mayo County Council, estimated that approximately 1,000 jobs in Westport were in the tourism and hospitality sector. During the early 2020s, Westport's economy was significantly tested by the COVID-19 pandemic.

== Demographics ==
Historical population
Year	Pop.	±%
1821	4,326	—
1831	4,448	+2.8%
1841	4,365	−1.9%
1851	4,114	−5.8%
1861	3,819	−7.2%
1871	4,417	+15.7%
1881	4,469	+1.2%
1891	4,070	−8.9%
1901	3,892	−4.4%
1911	3,674	−5.6%
1926	3,488	−5.1%
1936	3,409	−2.3%
1946	3,240	−5.0%
1951	3,104	−4.2%
1956	2,947	−5.1%
1961	2,882	−2.2%
1966	2,927	+1.6%
1971	3,023	+3.3%
1981	3,378	+11.7%
1986	3,456	+2.3%
1991	3,688	+6.7%
1996	4,520	+22.6%
2002	5,634	+24.6%
2006	5,475	−2.8%
2011	5,543	+1.2%
2016	6,198	+11.8%
2022	6,872	+10.9%

Between 1821 and 1841, Westport’s population remained relatively stable, hovering between 4,300 and 4,400. This was the pre-Famine period, when the town was a modest but steady regional centre.

In the wake of the Great Famine, the population declined to 4,114 by 1851 and fell further to 3,819 by 1861. However, unlike many rural parts of Mayo, Westport experienced recovery in the latter 19th century, climbing back above 4,400 in both 1871 and 1881, before dropping again to just over 4,000 in 1891. This reflected its role as a market and service town, somewhat cushioned from the worst of rural depopulation. The first half of the 20th century saw a steady decline, with numbers falling from 3,892 in 1901 to just 2,882 by 1961. Emigration, economic stagnation, and the collapse of traditional industries all contributed to the shrinking population. Westport during this period mirrored the wider depopulation trends of the west of Ireland.

From the mid-1960s, Westport began to stabilise and recover. The population grew modestly, from 2,927 in 1966 to 3,688 in 1991. This was a period when state-driven regional development and the beginnings of Westport’s modern tourism industry helped anchor the town’s economy. The turning point came in the Celtic Tiger era; By 1996, the population jumped to 4,520, and then to 5,634 in 2002. Even with a slight dip in 2006 (to 5,475), the trend was upward again by 2011 (5,543). The greatest growth came in the 2010s and 2020s, with the town reaching 6,198 in 2016 and 6,872 in 2022.

== Culture ==
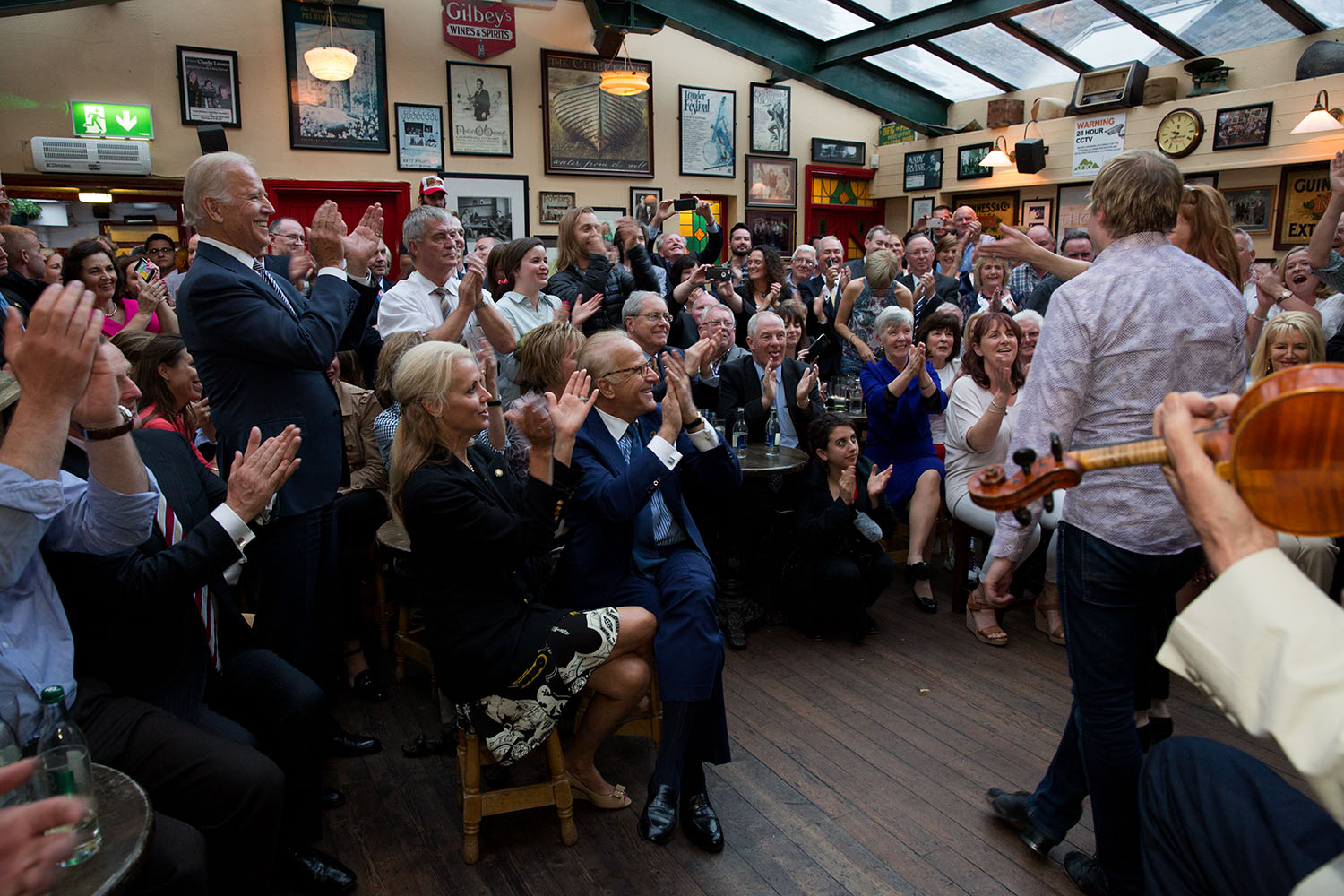
American Vice President Joe Biden applauds for Irish dancers and the band the Chieftains at Matt Molloy's pub in Westport in 2018

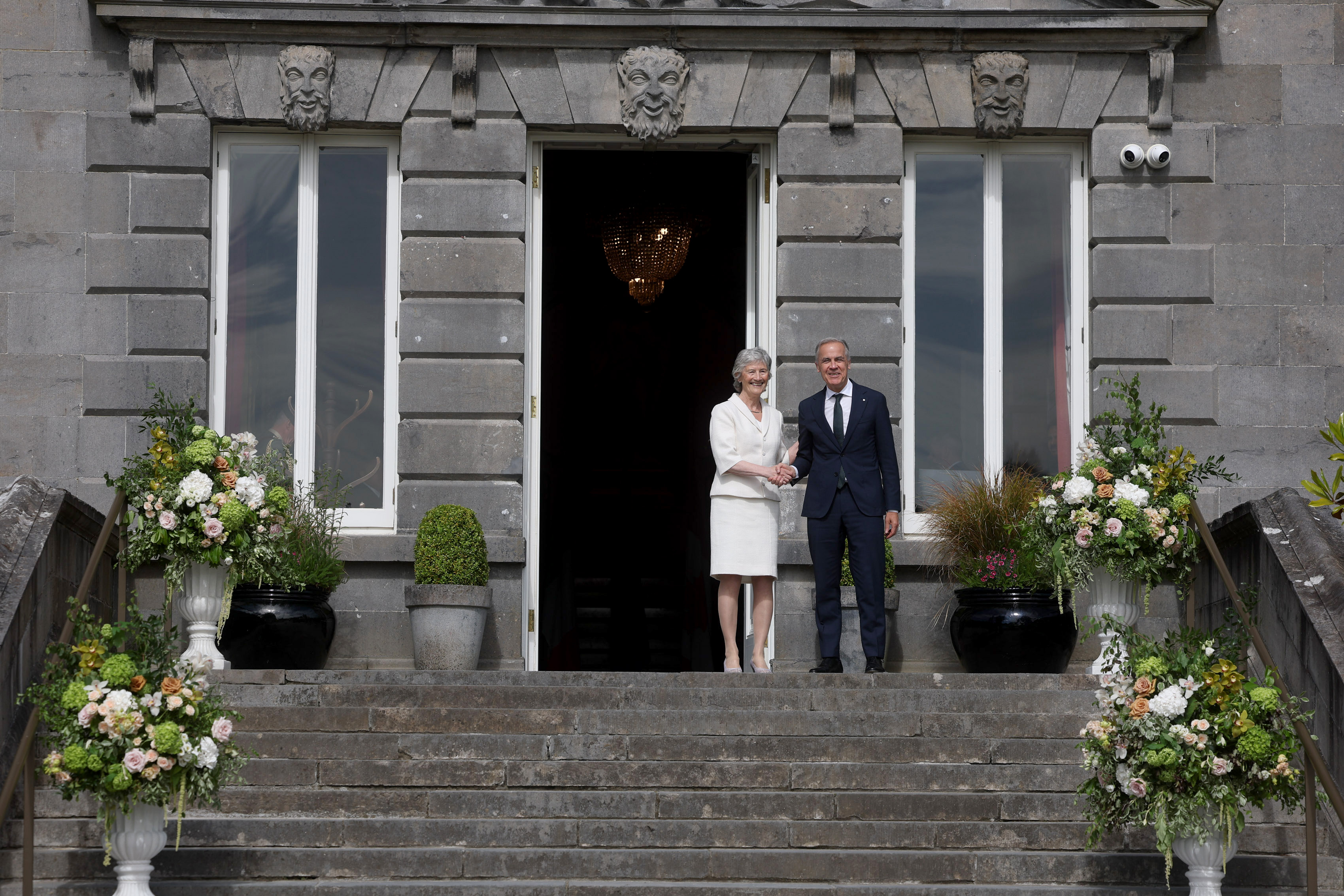
The President of Ireland, Catherine Connolly, receives the Prime Minister of Canada, Mark Carney, on the steps of Westport House in June 2026. Carney's grandparents were from the Westport area.

People from Westport town are traditionally known as "Coveys". Some decades ago the Covey dialect still existed and was unintelligible to outsiders. For example, the Covey word for a woman was a "doner".

Matt Molloy of the Chieftains has a pub and music venue on Bridge Street.

Westport Town Hall Theatre opened in the early 1900s and serves as a cultural hub. Located centrally on the Octagon (Westport’s main civic space), it has served as a base for local arts, community, and voluntary organisations. The hall was refurbished in 1973 and remained a key venue until its closure on health and safety grounds in 2008. The local community and authorities undertook a six-year fundraising and redevelopment programme from 2009 to 2015 to restore the venue. The joint initiative upgraded the ageing building into a modern, €3.2 million multi-purpose facility. Officially reopened in June 2015, the theatre includes a 225-seat auditorium. Since reopening, it has hosted a wide range of concerts, theatre productions, community talks, and festivals, including Westival, the Westport Folk and Bluegrass Festival, and the Westport Festival of Chamber Music.

The Custom House Studios and Gallery is the centre of the local arts scene.

=== Festivals and events ===
Several festivals and events are held in and around Westport each year. These include the Westport Music and Arts Festival (which was rebranded as "Westival" in 2018 and moved from September to October), a Croagh Patrick walking festival in March, a sea angling festival in June, and The Saltwater Festival (of "Music, Food, Art & Culture") in May. Additional annual events include Mayo Pride in July and the Rolling Sun literary festival in November.

The Westport Festival of Chamber Music, founded in 2013 by violinist Catherine Leonard, pianist Hugh Tinney and manager Madeleine Flanagan, is held annually in venues including Westport Town Hall Theatre and Holy Trinity Church.

== Media ==
=== Newspaper ===
Westport has a regional newspaper based in the town, The Mayo News, founded in 1892 by William and Patrick Dorris. Other newspapers available are the Mayo Advertiser, Western People and the Connaught Telegraph.

=== Radio ===
Local radio is delivered by Westport Radio 98.2 FM.

== Religion ==
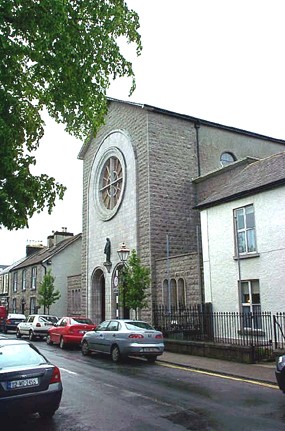
St Mary's Roman Catholic Church

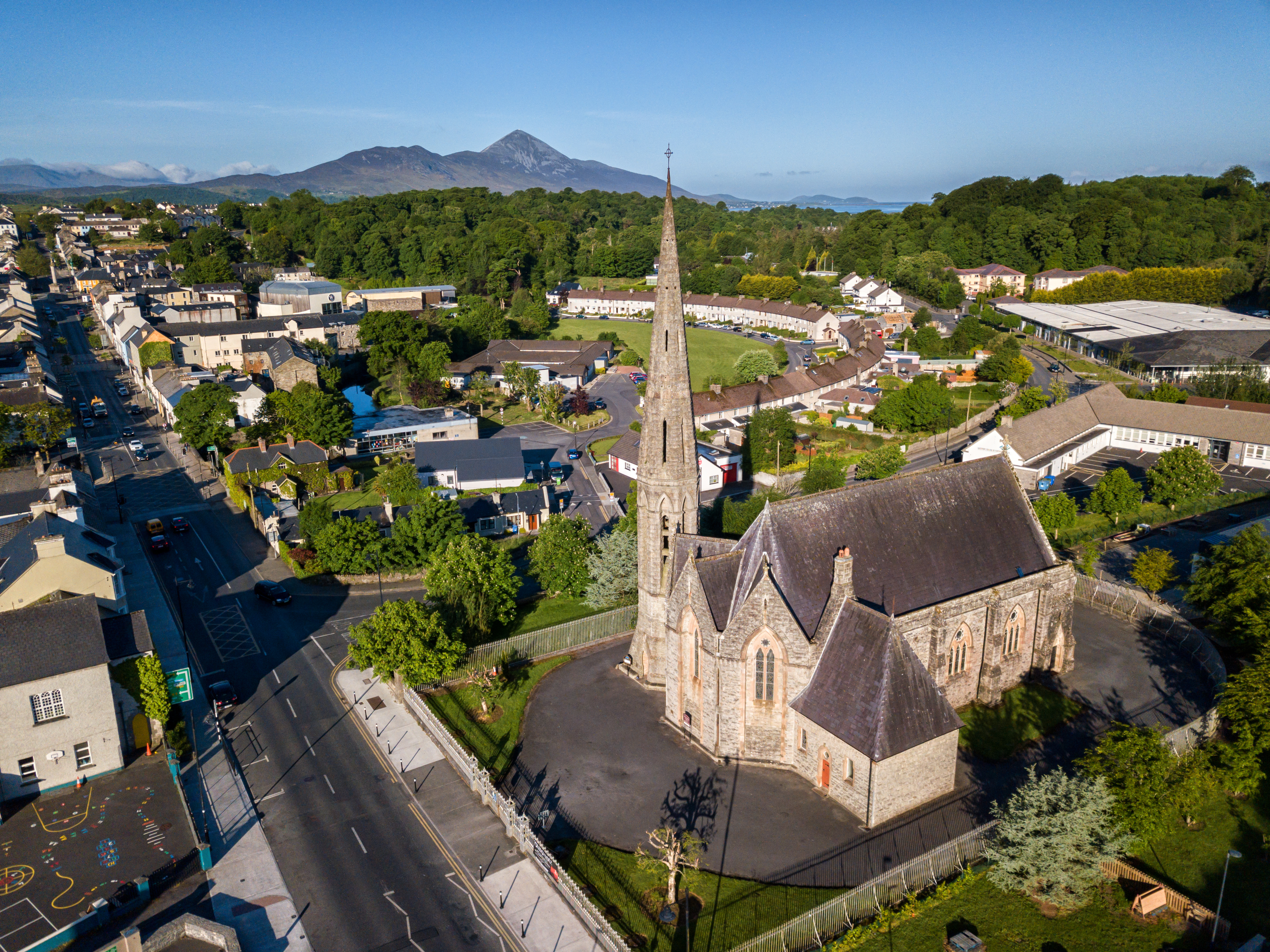
Holy Trinity Anglican Church was designed by Sir Thomas Newenham Deane (1827-99).

There are four churches in the town: The Elim Pentecostal church; Amazing Grace Fellowship, the Catholic Church, St Mary's; the Anglican church, Holy Trinity; the Evangelical church, Calvary Church Westport;

In 1787 Lord Altamont gave the Catholic Parish Priest Dr Charles Lynagh a lease for a Catholic chapel and parochial house at Riverside. A temporary structure may have been erected as the chapel was not commenced for a quarter century later. The foundation stone was laid in 1813. Dr Oliver Kelly received support in this from Catholics and Protestants alike. The building was of cut stone in the Gothic revival style, and fronted onto the Malls which were under construction. The cost of the church was about £6000. By the 1920s the original gothic building was too small and the administrator Father Patterson raised funds for a new church. This cost £30000 and incorporated the old gothic facade in the Mall. The dedication occurred in 1932. Work began to build the present St Mary's church in 1957 with the demolition of the old church and completed by 1961.

The old parish church of the Church of Ireland was built in 1797 beside the Carrowbeg River in the demesne of Westport House. That first church cost £617. 10s. 9d which was a gift from the Board of First Fruits, a body established to fund the building and repair of church buildings in the Church of Ireland in the late eighteenth and nineteenth century. William Thackeray described a 'pretty little church' on the 'pleasure grounds surrounding Westport House. The ruins of the church are still visible today.

By 1855 the Church of Ireland Community was too large for the existing church due to the expansion of the town and the growth of tourism. Not everyone could be accommodated at services and the building was in serious disrepair. The local Select Vestry promised a local contribution of £1200 on condition that the church would be rebuilt in its existing site. In 1868 an appeal was launched which announced that the Marquess of Sligo had donated by the Marquess of Sligo (the present location on Newport Road). The first plans were approved by Joseph Welland in 1869, these were not used apart from the distinctive pencil spire. Thomas Newenham Deane designed the second church. Holy Trinity church displays many features of the neo-Gothic style favoured by John Ruskin. The new Church was consecrated by the Lord Bishop of Tuam in 1872. The three main doors are made of iron wrought to create floral forms. The vestry door is on the East Side and is made of wood. The interior of the church is highly decorated. The upper walls of the nave are decorated with murals depicting scenes from the Gospels, erected around 1878. Canon James Owen Hannay whose pen name was George A. Birmingham served as rector from 1892 to 1913. By 1984 the restoration of the church became necessary and as there were only 40 parishioners remaining a Restoration Committee was formed with six Holy Trinity parishioners and six from St. Mary's Catholic Church. A total of £50,000 was raised by 1986 and the work completed.

In 2004 during the structural repairs of St. Mary's church the Select Vestry in Holy Trinity were able to offer St Mary's parishioners hospitality. Weekday and some weekend Masses were celebrated in Holy Trinity.

Historically, a Methodist church existed on the Mall and a Presbyterian church on Distillery Road.

Church records for the 19th century (Church of Ireland, Methodist, Roman Catholic, civil, gravestone inscriptions, etc.) and other historical records for the Westport area are held at the South Mayo Family Research Centre in Ballinrobe and the Clew Bay Heritage Centre at Westport Quay.

=== Religious Orders ===
The two main religious orders historically associated with Westport are the Congregation of Christian Brothers and the Sisters of Mercy. Dean Bernard Burke wrote to the founder of the Sisters of Mercy Catherine McAuley in 1841 asking for sisters for Westport. None were immediately available but following a renewed request six months after the death of the foundress, the first three sisters arrived in Westport on 9 September 1842. The Dean gave them his own house, Carrowbeg House as a temporary residence, while he went into lodgings for two years. On 24 December 1842 Lord Altamont agreed to Dean Burke's request for a site for a Convent for the Sisters. Dean Burke travelled all over Ireland and raised £3000 for the project. In the spring of 1843, the foundation stone of the new Convent was laid and the Convent built by John Gibbons to the same plan as the Convent in Carlow. Sister Paul Cullen was appointed by Archbishop McHale as the first Reverend Mother of the new convent. She was a sister of Cardinal Paul Cullen.

The Congregation of Christian Brothers arrived in Westport in 1865. They took over the Castlebar Street School for Primary and Secondary students. Initially, they were accommodated in Carrowbeg House. In 1922 they acquired Grove House on Mill Street from the Sisters of Mercy. Then they moved to their new residence on Newport Road where they lived until they left Westport in 2002

== Education ==
Westport has two secondary schools, five primary schools, and Westport College of Further Education, which opened in 2009. The educational facilities for boys in Westport were for many decades associated with the Congregation of Christian Brothers, who first established a school on Castlebar Street in 1865 before transferring to Newport Road in 1962, where the former national school building can still be seen. Rice College, the town's all-boys secondary school, was constructed in 1987 on Castlebar Road to meet growing educational needs, and today it has 528 pupils. The second secondary school, Sacred Heart School, is an all-girls institution with over 500 pupils.

Scoil Phádraig is the largest of the primary schools, with more than 300 pupils. It was formed in 2006 through the amalgamation of Scoil Phádraig na mBráithre (Saint Patrick's Christian Brothers' School) and Saint Patrick's Mercy National School, and it is located on Newport Road on the site of the old Christian Brothers School. Gaelscoil na Cruaiche, an all-Irish Catholic primary school founded in 1995, gained official recognition in 2000 and moved into a permanent building in 2011; it now has 207 pupils and eleven teachers. Holy Trinity National School, a co-educational school under the patronage of the Church of Ireland, is also located on Newport Road, with 62 pupils enrolled. Its previous premises, built in the 19th century under the Kildare Street and Tuam Diocesan Societies, was declared unfit in 2010. In February 2022, it was announced that a new Holy Trinity school building would be constructed on the grounds of the former Scoil Phádraig on Altamont Street, after staff and pupils objected in 2020 to plans for co-location with Westport Educate Together.

The planned relocation of Holy Trinity National School to the former Scoil Phádraig site was subsequently altered when the Department of Education instead allocated the site, temporarily, to Sacred Heart Secondary School, citing an urgent need for accommodation on health and safety grounds. More than 150 people took part in a protest at the site, with Holy Trinity's principal, Orla Brickenden, describing the decision as unfair given the school's own long-running campaign for a new building. The Department of Education said it remained committed to delivering the Holy Trinity project and had engaged with the school's patron, the Bishop of Tuam, Limerick and Killaloe, on interim supports for the school. Sacred Heart School said it expected its relocation to the site to be of short duration.

The Quay School, or Saint Columbkille's Primary School, serves the Quay area of the town. Westport Educate Together, a multi-denominational primary school, opened in 2019 at Sharkey Hill Community Centre before relocating to temporary premises at Westport Woods Hotel for the 2022–23 school year.

== Transport ==
=== Rail ===
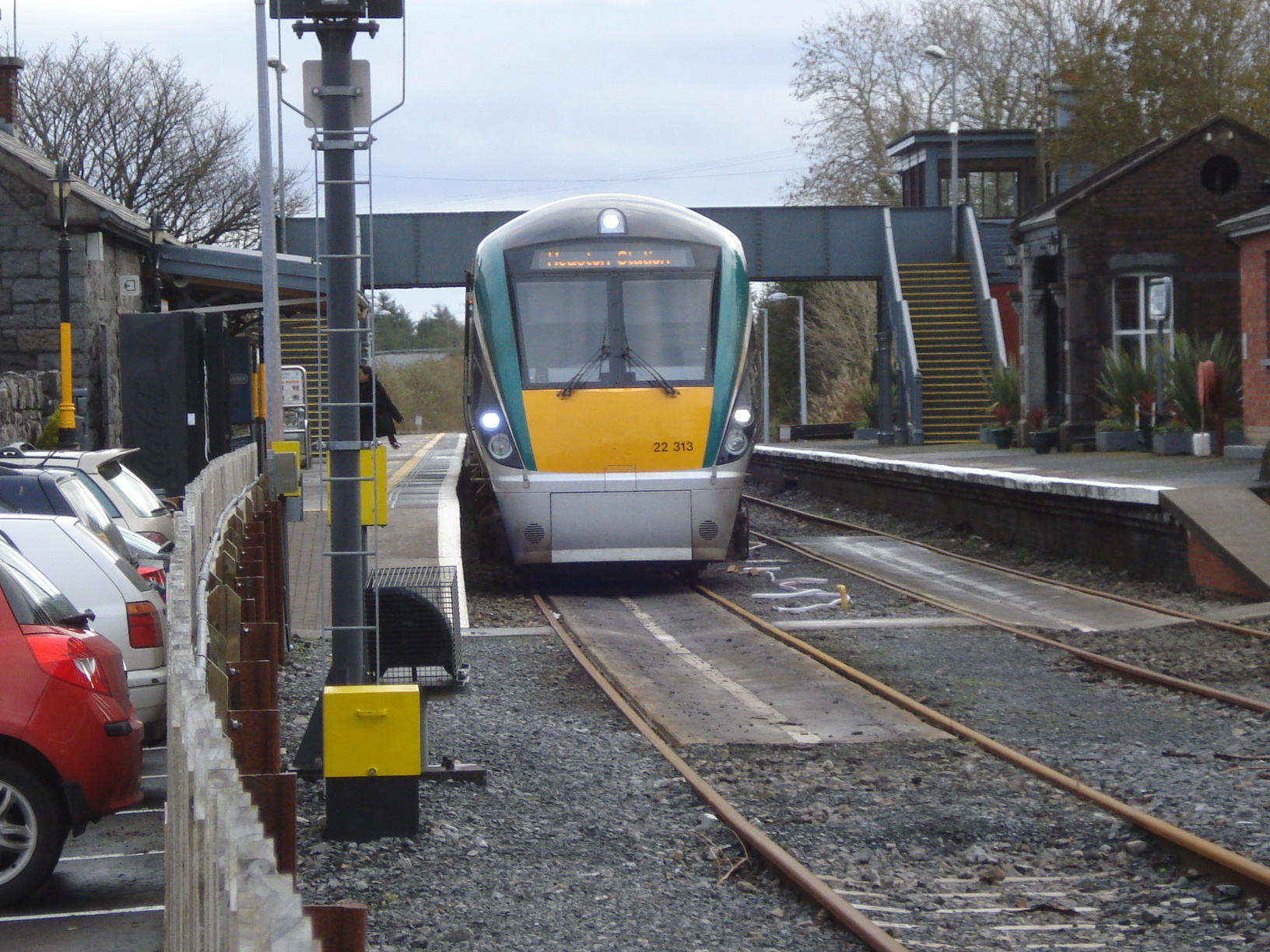
Westport railway station

The town is the terminus of a 250 km Dublin-Westport/Galway railway line from Dublin Heuston in Dublin. This railway connects the town to Castlebar. Westport railway station opened on 28 January 1866. The line originally ran through to Westport Quay station (opened on 1 January 1875 and closed in April 1977). This line was lifted overnight in 1977 by Córas Iompair Éireann (CIÉ). In order to pacify local concern, the bulk of the trackbed of this extension was converted to a public walkway, still open today. There was also a branch to Achill Island branching off after the station, but this closed in 1937.

=== Bicycle ===
The Great Western Greenway is a greenway rail trail that follows the route of the former Midland Great Western Railway branch line to Achill, via Newport and Mulranny.

=== Road ===
The N5 national primary route also connects the town to Castlebar, as well as connecting to the N4 near Longford that leads onward to Dublin. The other major road passing through Westport is the N59 national secondary route.

In April 2023, a 10 km section of the N5 Castlebar bypass, connecting a new roundabout at Turlough to the Westport road, was opened to traffic as part of a wider 25 km road upgrade linking Westport and Turlough.

=== Air ===
The regional airport is Ireland West Airport, 60 km (37 mi) away.

=== Port (Westport Quay) ===
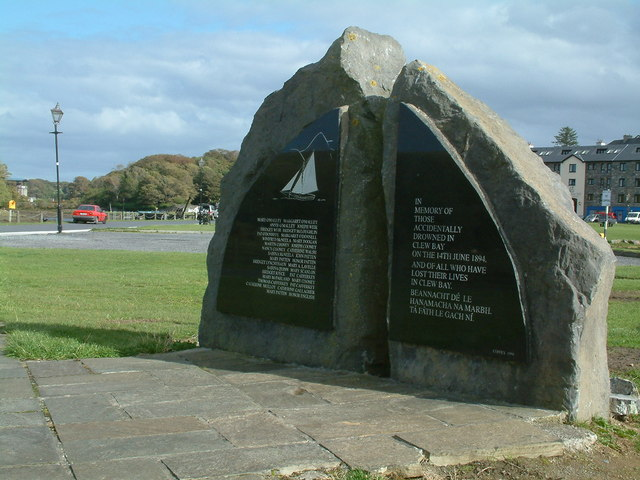
Memorial for the Clew Bay Drowning

Westport has a small adjoining port, the quay, once busy but no longer used for commercial shipping. In 1894, the harbour was the scene of the Clew Bay Drowning.

The quay is situated some distance from the deep waters of Clew Bay, a defensive advantage in the towns development which was noted in an Irish Times article of 1884:

"The port of Westport somewhat resembles Sligo and Ballina in regard to its inaccessibility from the sea. The ancient West Coast population were not anxious to be within easy reach of the pirates and freebooters, who dwelt in the islands or on remote promontories, and accordingly the wealthier inhabitants built their towns where opportunities existed for ensuring a de-fence against a sudden landing. The channel leading from Westport quay is nearly six miles long before it reaches the roadstead of Innislyre, in which ships of burden can anchor or make an immediate run out to sea."

The quay area is now home to a number of warehouse conversions, and has several restaurants and pubs. The Clew Bay Heritage Centre, a small museum celebrating the history of Westport and the maritime history of Clew Bay, is open to the public here.

In March 2026, a new €6.8 million Irish Coast Guard station was officially opened in Westport as part of the Irish Coast Guard Building Programme. The site, secured through Mayo County Council, lies within the Clew Bay Complex Special Area of Conservation. The Westport Coast Guard Unit, established more than twenty years earlier, comprises 28 volunteer members who provide round-the-clock water and land-based search and rescue services from Killary Harbour to Mulranny.

=== Taxis and late-night transport ===
Westport's growing visitor numbers and expanding nightlife led to calls for improved late-night transport provision in the town. In January 2026, Cllr Brendan Mulroy proposed a meeting between Mayo County Council, the Garda Síochána and local transport operators to address a shortage of taxis and hackneys, particularly at weekends. Councillors noted a long-standing local arrangement, made on the advice of a former Garda superintendent, under which no formal taxi ranks were provided in the town so as to allow both taxi and hackney operators to work. An enforcement operation carried out by the National Transport Authority, the Garda Síochána and other State agencies in December 2025 and January 2026 issued fines to unlicensed operators under the Taxi Regulation Act.

== Sport ==
The Gaelic football club, Westport United soccer club and the rugby club have competed in county and national events. Westport, and the surrounding region, has been identified as a primary centre for adventure sports by Fáilte Ireland. Every August it hosts the largest one-day adventure multi-sport race of its kind in the world – Gael Force West. It is also home to horse riding, surfing, sea kayaking, windsurfing and sailing schools and other adventure sports.

=== Angling ===
Westport is an angling centre providing sea fishing on Clew Bay and game and coarse fishing on nearby loughs and rivers.

Clew Bay is also a sea angling centre hosting several sea fishing competitions each year, and is known as a venue for common skate fishing. It holds the Irish record for a 160 lb white skate. It is also home to tope, huss and ray.

=== Gaelic games ===
The Westport GAA club, CLG Chathair na Mart, have a history going back to the nineteenth century. Gaelic football is the main sport played within the club.

=== Golf ===
Westport Golf Club (championship) was in 2009 ranked 43rd out of the top 100 golf courses in Ireland by Golf Digest. The Golfers Guide to Ireland 2016 voted Westport as the best Parkland in Connaught for the second time in the preceding three years. It has hosted a number of tournaments, including the Ladies Home Internationals in 1989 and the Irish Amateur Close Championship on three occasions, the last time in 1997. It also hosted the Irish PGA Championship in 2002.

=== Soccer ===
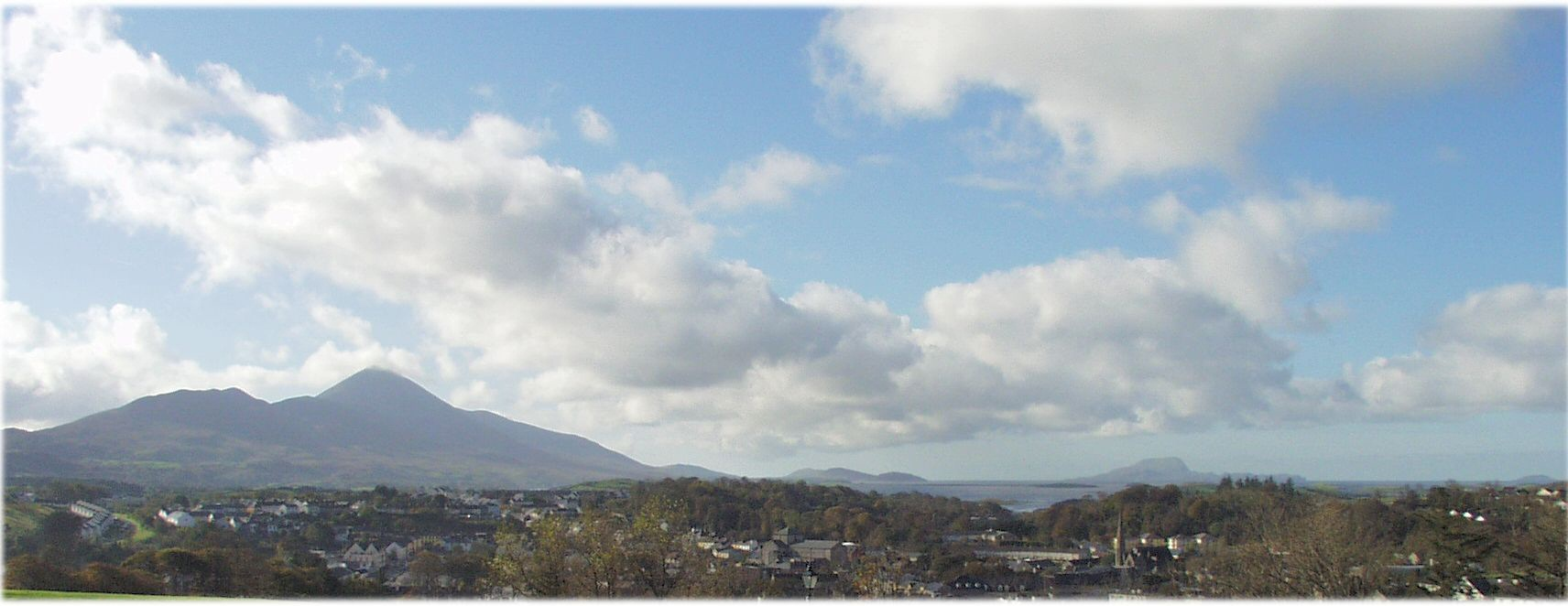
Panoramic view of Westport as seen from the Castlebar side, showing Croagh Patrick (left background) and Clare Island (right background)

Westport United football club was founded in 1911. Westport United won the FAI Junior Cup in 2005 in Kilkenny and play their home matches in the newly developed United Park, which opened in September 2016. Westport United still uses the Sports Park for some underage games. The club colours are red and black. Westport also won the Connaught Cup in 1942, 1945, 1949, 1961, 1974, 1987 and 2012 along with numerous Mayo titles. Westport United's training ground is located in The Quay area.

=== Rugby ===
Westport Rugby Club are located in Carrowholly, a few kilometres outside the town. League and Cawley cup champions in 2016 and junior cup champions in 2015.

=== Basketball ===
Westport Warriors Basketball Club run for all different age groups and are part of the MABB League.

== Notable people ==
- George A. Birmingham (1865–1950), writer, rector of Holy Trinity Church, Westport; his play General John Regan caused a riot when staged in Westport
- Cornelius Coughlan (1828–1915), Irish recipient of Victoria Cross, died and buried in Westport
- Peter Chalmers Cowan (1859–1930), civil engineer
- Séamus Hughes (born 1952), politician; Fianna Fáil Teachta Dála (TD) for the Mayo West constituency
- Lee Keegan (born 1989), Gaelic footballer
- John MacBride (1868–1916), Born in Westport, he was executed in 1916 for his part in the Easter Rising; He is commemorated by a monument on the Mall; He was the father of Nobel peace laureate Seán MacBride
- Joseph Maher (1933–1998), actor
- Conor O'Malley (born 1994), footballer
- Michael Ring (born 1953), Fine Gael politician; Teachta Dála (TD) for the Mayo constituency

== International ties ==
Westport is twinned with Plougastel-Daoulas in Brittany, France and with Limavady, County Londonderry, Northern Ireland. The link with the latter has its roots in the 1980s and the official ratification and twinning ceremony took place in 2002.

Since 1982, Westport also has had a partnership with the town of Aror, Kenya, and the people of Westport have contributed to improving the infrastructure of Aror.

== See also ==
- List of towns and villages in Ireland

== Sources ==
- Peadar O Flanagan, "An Outline History of the Town of Westport. Part 1. The origins and early development of the town 1750–80", in Cathar na Mart: The Journal of the Westport Historical Society; volume 1, part I, 1981; parts II-IV in volumes 2, 3 and 4, 1982–84.
- Kieran Clarke, "Clew Bay boating disaster", in Cathar na Mart; 6, 1986.
- Brendan Jeffars, Westport – an early Irish example of town planning, 1734–1950, Cahar na Mart; 8, 1988.
- Jarlath Duffy, "The port of Westport, 1800–1850", in Cathar na Mart; 15, pp. 1–14, 1995.
- Vincent Keane, "Westport and the Irish Volunteers. Part I:the early years, 1914–1916", Cathar na Mart; 22, pp. 84–88, 2002
