= Westport Town Hall Theatre =

Municipal building in Westport, County Mayo, Ireland

- Amharclann Halla an Bhaile Cathair na Mart
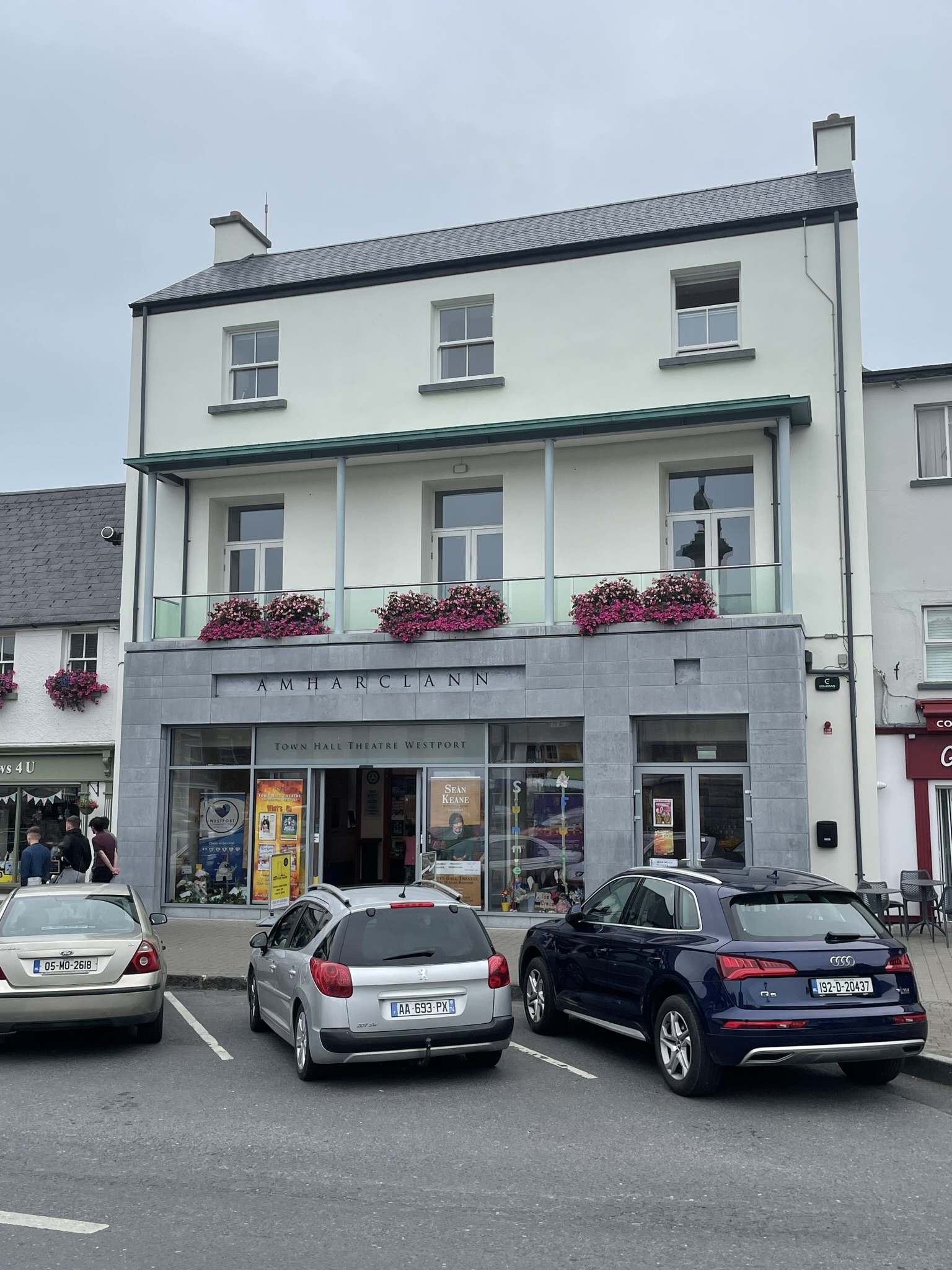
- Westport Town Hall Theatre

- Location within Ireland

General information
- Architectural style: Neoclassical style
- Location: The Octagon, Westport, Ireland
- Coordinates: 53.7993°N 9.5241°W
- Completed: 1903

Westport Town Hall Theatre (Irish: Amharclann Halla an Bhaile Cathair na Mart), formerly Westport Town Hall (Irish: Halla an Bhaile Cathair na Mart), is a community events venue in The Octagon, Westport, County Mayo, Ireland.

== History ==
The building commissioned by Canon Michael McDonald, as a community events venue for the town. He bought a late 18th century private house known as Octagon House, on the east side of The Octagon, for the purpose. The building was designed in the neoclassical style, built in brick and was completed in 1903. The design involved an asymmetrical main frontage of the three bays facing onto The Octagon. It featured a round headed doorway with a canopy and a fanlight in the right hand bay, and sash windows in the two bays to the left. On the first floor, there was a central French door flanked by two sash windows and a wide balcony extending almost the full width of the building while, on the second floor, there were three small square windows. The structure was surmounted by a hipped roof.

During the Irish Civil War, the building became the headquarters of the pro-treaty forces commanded by Brigadier-General Joe Ring in July 1922. The troops billeted there shot off the head of the statue of the banker, George Clendining, in the middle of The Octagon, during their defence of the town. Ring was killed by anti-treaty forces in a guerilla attack during the battle of Ox Mountains a few months later.

After the war, the town hall continued to serve as a venue for public events, such as a performance of the comic opera, The Mikado, produced by the Westport Musical Society in May 1938. In 1966, on the 50th anniversary of the Easter Rising, the Minister for Social Welfare, Kevin Boland, visited Westport and inspected a guard of honour outside the town hall.

Some improvements to the town hall was carried out in 1973 but, by 2008, the building had become very dilapidated. An extensive programme of refurbishment works, intended to create a 225-seat auditorium, was subsequently implemented. After completion of the works, which cost €3.2 million and were financed by Department of Arts, Heritage and the Gaeltacht, Mayo County Council, the South West Mayo Development Company and Fáilte Ireland, the building was officially re-opened by the Minister of State for Tourism and Sport, Michael Ring, in June 2015. Since then, it has hosted a series of concerts and theatrical performances.
