= Alison Pilkington =

Irish artist

- Born: Sligo, Ireland
- Occupation: Artist
- Website: http://www.alisonpilkington.com/newsexhibitions.html

Alison Pilkington (born 1967 in Sligo, Ireland) is an Irish artist. She graduated with a Diploma in Fine Art Painting and Printmaking from Sligo RTC in 1989 and with a BA Hons in Fine Art Painting from The National College of Art and Design, Dublin in 1990. She is a lecturer in Painting at IADT Dun Laoghaire, a Board Member of The Model Arts and Niland Gallery, Sligo and Co – Editor of ‘The Fold’ publication with Cora Cummins, a publishing platform for invited artists to consider various themes. In 2012 she won a British Institution award for painting at the Royal Academy Summer Exhibition, London. In the same year she was shortlisted for the Marmite Painting Prize, which toured the UK from December 2012 to June 2013. In 2013 Pilkington was a Prizewinner in the 5th International ArtSlant Prize.

Pilkington describes her art practice as exploring the idea of the psychological self and how this might be manifested through painting. Her paintings are quasi-figurative, and attempt to play with familiar, yet comic images having the uncanny potential to disturb or disorientate.

== Selected solo exhibitions ==
- "Between One Thing and Another" Custom House studios, Westport (2010)
- "Doppelganger" Kevin Kavanagh Gallery (2007)
- "Belltable" Arts Centre, Limerick (2006)
- "Guided By Stars" Kevin Kavanagh Gallery (2006)
- "New Work" The Workroom, Dublin (2004)
- "New Work" The Workroom Dublin (2002)
- "New Work" Kevin Kavanagh Gallery, Dublin (2001)
- "Scenes From the Natural World" Basement Gallery, Dundalk (2000)
- "New Work" Sligo Art Gallery (2000)
- "Transmitting" Kevin Kavanagh Gallery, Dublin (1999)

== Selected group exhibitions ==
- "Slippery and Amorphous" St Marylebone Parish Church, Crypt Gallery, London (2016);
- "The Visitor" The Engine Room, Belfast (2015)
- " U-Turn" Temple Bar, Dublin (2015)
- "Autocatalyctic Future Games" No Format Gallery, London (2015)
- "@paintBritain" Ipswich Art School, Ipswich (Oct 2014 - Feb 2015)
- "Contemporary British Painting" Huddersfield Art Gallery (2015);
- "Malevolentos" Pallas Contemporary Projects, Dublin (2014)
- "The Visitor" The Drawing Project, Dun Laoghaire, Dublin (2012)
- "What Hiver" Studio & Temple Bar, Dublin (2009)
- "Disasters Of War" Original Print Gallery, Dublin (2005)
- "Elsewhere from here" The Workroom, Dublin 7 (2003)
- "Composites" Original Print Gallery, Temple Bar, Dublin (2003)
- "In Progress" The Workroom, Dublin (2002)
- "Selected" Artists Gallery Lecrin, La Herradura, Granada Provincia, Spain (2001)
- "Print" Cross Gallery, Francis St, Dublin (2001)
- "Stonemetal Press International Print Show, Parchman- Stremmel Galleries, San Antonio Texas (2000)

== Selected collections ==
- The Priseman Seabrook Collection, UK
- University College Dublin
