= Aror, Kenya =

Town in Kenya

Aror (also written "Arror") is a small rural town in the Kerio Valley of northwestern Kenya.

Since 1982, Aror has partnered with Westport, Republic of Ireland, to receive development aid.
