= Zonderwater POW camp =

Zonderwater POW Graves
- Operational scope: Largest allied POW camp in World War Two
- Planned by: South African Army Zonderwater concentration camp was an Italian prisoners of war (POW) camp

The Zonderwater concentration camp was a prisoners of war (POW) camp that was established in 1941 during World War II in South Africa. Consisting initially of tents, in the Cullinan area, this internment camp became the biggest Allied concentration camp, with almost 100,000 POW. Still a member of the Commonwealth, Jan Smuts wanted to show that South Africa could meet its existing obligations to protect the security of the Empire. He had refused German POW because of German sympathies among the Ossewabrandwag and the Stormjaers, and instead housed Italian POW, far away from the theatre of war and their homes, as it would be unlikely that these opponents could return home

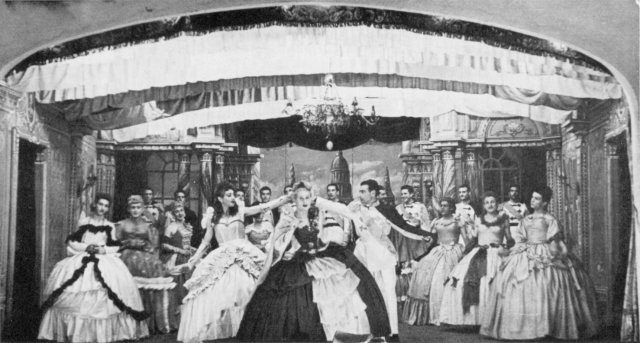
'n scene from The Count of Luxembourgh performed by Italian prisoners of war in Zonderwater. All the parts were perfromed by men.

In March 1941, Italian war prisoners from East Africa were transported by ship to Durban harbour, then by train to Pietermaritzburg on livestock wagons, to be deloused and inspected after which they were transported up to the waterless place (Zonderwater) near Pretoria. There, they met with inadequate facilities, accommodation and clothing against the highveld winter.

"South Africa were not ready, we were not organised for, we were not expecting, such large numbers so suddenly" The camp and its commonders were not ready to receive prisoners nor could they house them according to the standards laid out in the Geneva Convention.

Zonderwater's first camp commander was Col Rennie, who found duties challenging. He was replaced by Colonel Dawid de Wet and then Colonel Hendrik Prinsloo. These commanders encountered a vast concentration of humans, requiring hygiene substance and shelter.

Colonel Hendrik Prinsloo, the son of H. F. Prinsloo, a commander of the Carolina Boer Commando at Spion Kop, turned Zonderwater into a place of respect where prisoners, a commander and various communities, chose to work together. This internment facility was made by POW's who converted the camp into a set of barracks that would house over 90 000 prisoners. Permanent built-up structures of brick and wooden buildings were arranged as blocks. Each block could hold 8000 prisoners and there were 44 blocks in total, able to house 112 000 people.

Prinsloo built up the prisoners' morale and self-esteem by organizing picnics, treating the prisoners like adults, making improvements to buildings, allowing visits from the Archbishop, and arranging daily exercises. Under his command, an orchestra was even formed and craft exhibitions and art classes were organized. A library with 10,000 books was established and 11,500 prisoners voluntarily attended school. Illiteracy among the prisoners, who included many small farmers, was reduced from 30% to 2%. The camp was closed in January 1947, but the Zonderwater - Italian WW2 P.O.W cemetery can still be visited and the Zonderwater spirit can still be seen.
