= Hendrik Prinsloo =

South African army officer (1890–1966)

Hendrik Prinsloo, OBE, ED
- Born: Hendrik Frederik Prinsloo; 18 August 1890; Carolina, South African Republic (now Mpumalanga)
- Died: 20 November 1966 (aged 76); Ermelo, Transvaal, South Africa
- Relatives: Stephanie Cecilia Weidner, d. 19 November 1941 (two children); Grace Madeleine Sedgwick
- Military career
- Allegiance: South Africa
- Branch: South African Army
- Rank: Colonel
- Unit: Regiment Botha
- Commands: Zonderwater prisoner of war camp
- Conflicts: First World War; South West Africa campaign; Maritz rebellion; Western Front; Bondelswarts Rebellion
- Awards: OBE, ED, Croix de Guerre avec Palmes, Mentioned in dispatches
- Other work: Farming, provincial politics

Hendrik Frederik Prinsloo (18 August 1890 – 20 November 1966) was a South African army officer. As a 12-year-old boy, he was interned by the British in a concentration camp during the Anglo-Boer War but served alongside the British in the South African forces during the two World Wars. He is best remembered for the humanitarian manner in which he, as commandant, ran the Zonderwater Italian prisoner of war camp.

== Early life ==
Prinsloo was the son of commandant Hendrik Frederik Prinsloo (1861–1900), who commanded the Carolina Boer Commando at the Battle of Spion Kop and was killed in action at Witkloof, and his wife, Cecilia Maria Steyn. In 1926, Boer and Briton erected a monument to commemorate his gallantry at Witkloof.

He was also a direct descendant of Hendrik Frederik Prinsloo (1784–1816), who was executed for his involvement in the Slagter's Nek rebellion in 1815.

As a boy of 12, he was taken prisoner of war by the British while carrying arms in his father's Commando (the Carolinaers) during the Second Boer War. Because of his tender age, he was lodged in the Barberton concentration camp with his mother.

After the war he became a magistrate's court interpreter in Natal Province and eventually farmed in the Carolina district.

== Military career ==
During the Boer Revolt of 1914, Prinsloo sided with the South African government forces. On 12 January 1915, he was appointed "honorary lieutenant, supernumerary list (Active Citizen Force)". During his subsequent service in German South West Africa he became aide-de-camp to Colonel Commandant WR Collins from January to August 1915.

On 26 November 1915, he joined the 1st Regiment, Military Constabulary.

Although no specific reference to his service in France can be found, it would appear that he served with the South African Brigade which formed part of the 9th (Scottish) Division. In his address to a 1947 reunion of Middlesex Regiment officers, he mentioned that members of the regiment had served under his command. The 3/10th Battalion (The Middlesex Regiment) landed at Le Havre on 1 June 1917 and was attached to South African Brigade. He was awarded the French Croix de Guerre.

On 31 December 1919, he resigned from the army and assumed an appointment with the Permanent Police Force as headquarters sub-inspector. Later he settled in Windhoek where he became commander of the Windhoek Town and District Police.

In 1922, as a lieutenant in the Military Constabulary in South West Africa he took a leading part in ending the Bondelswarts Rebellion. He was the leader of the force which tracked down and killed the rebel leader Abraham Morris. This brought about the subsequent surrender of the Bondel insurgents.

At the outbreak of World War II, he was commanding officer of the Regiment Botha. As he was about to depart for North Africa with his regiment, he was recalled at the instance of Field Marshal JC Smuts who was the Prime Minister and Minister of Defence and placed in command of the vast Italian prisoner of war camp at Zonderwater (also spelt Sonderwater) near Cullinan.

In 1947, he represented the Union of South Africa at the Diplomatic Conference held in Geneva for the purpose of revising the International Convention Relative to the Treatment of Prisoners-of-War, that is, the Geneva Convention of 1929.

On 28 August 1947, he was transferred to the reserve of officers.

== Zonderwater prisoner of war camp ==
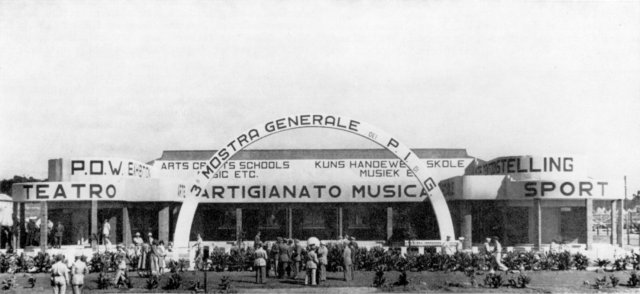
Theatre, library, shop and welfare offices complex at the Zonderwater POW camp

On 12 November 1941, Prinsloo was posted to No 8 Prisoner of War Battalion, First Reserve Brigade. In December 1942 he assumed duty as assistant camp commandant of the prisoner-of-war camp, Zonderwater, and in the following year he was promoted acting colonel, an appointment he held until 1 April 1947, when he was released and taken on as supernumerary to the establishment.

Zonderwater camp, which can more accurately be described as a city, was the largest of the eighteen known World War II Italian POW camps and held nearly a hundred thousand prisoners of war before it closed down on 1 January 1947. The appointment of Colonel Hendrik Prinsloo OBE as commanding officer was inspired. As a result of his efforts Zonderwater became one of the best functioning military camps in South Africa.

There was an improvement in living conditions, which included the establishment of an orchestra and a 10 000 book library, craft exhibitions and art classes. Illiteracy dropped from 30% to 2%. In short, life at Zonderwater was as close to civilian life for the prisoners, all due to Colonel Prinsloo who cared for his charges.

== Recognition ==
Prinsloo was awarded the French Croix de Guerre and was Mentioned in Despatches for services in the First World War. He received the Efficiency Decoration on 11 April 1944 and was made an Officer of the Military Division of the Order of the British Empire on 14 June 1945.

His efforts were recognised by the post-war Italian Government on 25 November 1949 when he, as the Camp Commandant, and three of his officers were invested with the Order of the Star of Italy. The award was made to those who had specially contributed to the re-building of post-war Italy. Prinsloo was further recognised by the award of the Order of Good Merit by the Pope.

== Civilian life ==
Between World War I and World War II, Prinsloo was a farmer in the Ermelo in the Eastern Transvaal district.

He was at one time president of the Eastern Transvaal Agricultural Union and distinguished himself at sport, particularly at horse-riding.

In 1940, he doffed his uniform to win the Provincial Council by-election in the constituency of Carolina, and represented it in the Transvaal Provincial Council for six years.

== Family life ==
Prinsloo's first wife, Stephanie Cecilia Weidner, died on 19 November 1941, leaving two children. On 10 April 1946, he married Grace Madeleine Sedgwick.

== Death ==
Prinsloo died in Ermelo, South Africa, on 20 November 1966.
