= Spioenkop Dam Nature Reserve =

Reserved area in South Africa

Spioenkop Nature Reserve
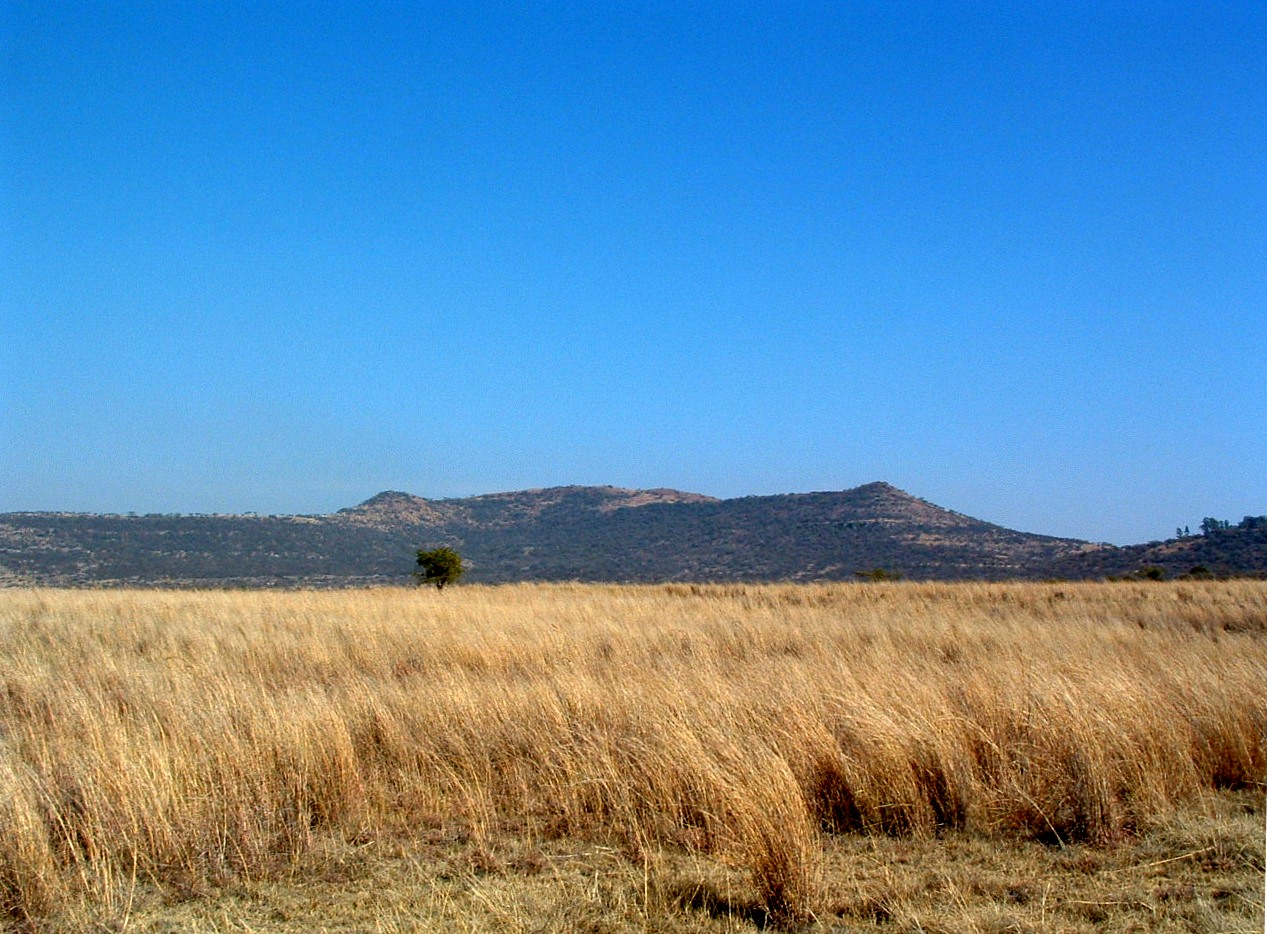
- Landscape with Spioenkop hill in the background

- Location within KwaZulu-Natal
- Location: KwaZulu-Natal, South Africa
- Nearest city: Ladysmith
- Coordinates: 28°40′S 29°31′E
- Governing body: Ezemvelo KZN Wildlife

Spioenkop Dam Nature Reserve or Spion Kop Nature Reserve is a protected area in KwaZulu-Natal, South Africa. It encloses the dam and reservoir, while the eponymous mountain lies on the northern border of the reserve. It lies close to Ladysmith with Winterton being the closest town, and is about 4,400 hectares (17 sq mi). The historic battlefield site can be reached by road.

The park was established in 1975.

The climate is temperate, with annual rainfall of about 814 mm per square meter. The rainy season is in the period March-October.

== See also ==
Protected areas of South Africa

- Battle of Spion Kop
- Spioenkop Dam
