= Spion Kop (mountain) =

Mountain in South Africa

- Spioenkop
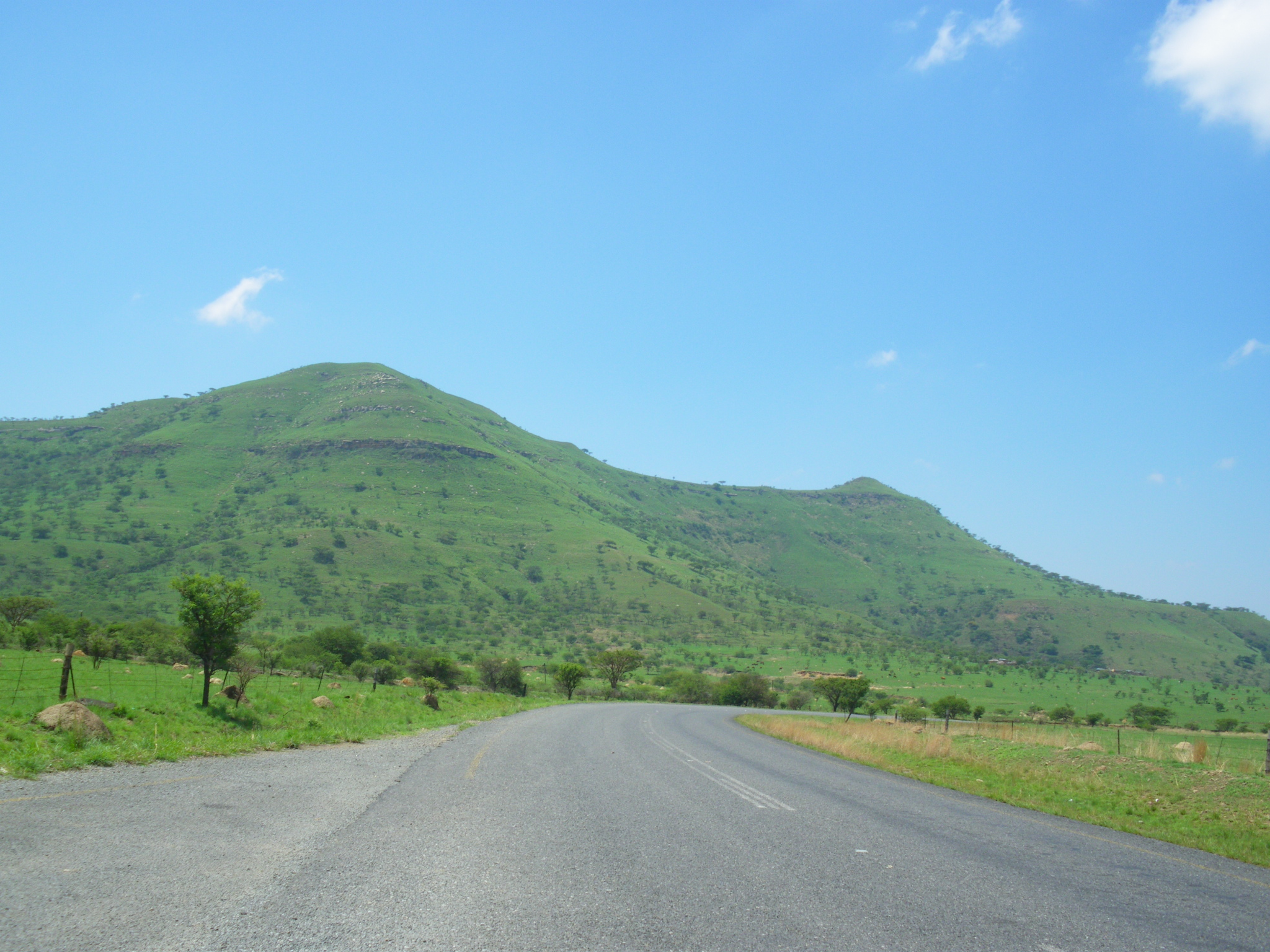

Highest point
- Elevation: 1,460 m (4,790 ft)
- Listing: List of mountains in South Africa
- Coordinates: 28°39′0″S 29°30′59″E

Geography
- Location within KwaZulu-Natal
- Location: KwaZulu-Natal
- Parent range: Drakensberg

Spion Kop (/ˌspaɪənˈkɒp/ SPY-ən-KOP, US also /ˈspaɪənkɒp, ˈspiː-/ SPY-ən-kop, SPEE-; Afrikaans: Spioenkop "Lookout Mountain", pronounced [spiˈunkɔp]) is a mountain in the province of KwaZulu-Natal, South Africa. It is located near the town of Ladysmith, 27 km to the WSW and about 2.5 km to the north of the Spioenkop Dam, a reservoir for the waters of the Tugela River.

== History ==
This mountain has historical significance. Its hilltop was the site of the Battle of Spion Kop (one of the most important battles of the Boer Wars) from 23 to 24 January 1900.

Spion Kop Nature Reserve is located beneath the southern side of this mountain.

== See also ==
- Spion Kop Battlefield Memorials
- Spion Kop (stadiums)
- SAS Spioenkop (F147) – a Valour-class frigate of the South African Navy
