= Schalk Willem Burger =

South African politician (1852–1918)

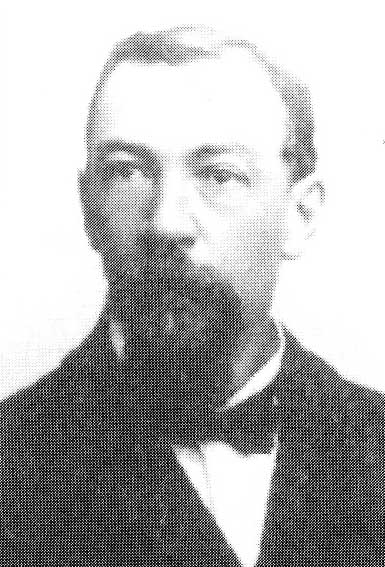

6th President of the South African Republic
- In office 11 September 1900 – 31 May 1902
- Preceded by: Paul Kruger
- Succeeded by: Office abolished

Personal details
- Born: 6 September 1852; Lydenburg, Transvaal
- Died: 5 December 1918 (aged 66); Goedgedacht, South Africa
- Spouse: Alida C. De Villiers
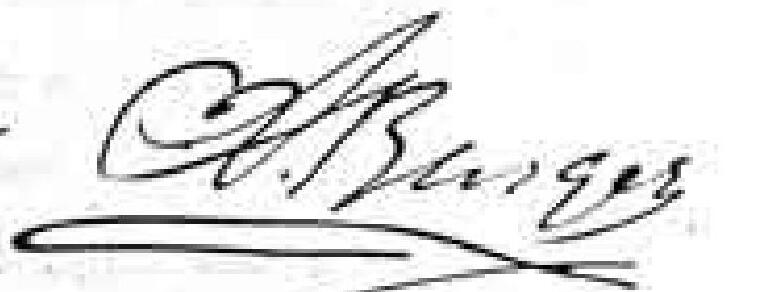
- Signature

Military service
- Allegiance: South African Republic
- Commands: Lydenburg Commando
- Wars: Sekhukhune Wars; First Boer War; Second Boer War; Battle of Modder River; Battle of Spion Kop

Schalk Willem Burger (6 September 1852 – 5 December 1918) was a South African military leader, lawyer, politician, and statesman who was acting president of the South African Republic from 1900 to 1902, whilst Paul Kruger was in exile. At the age of 21, Burger worked as a clerk in the office of the field coronet. He married his wife, Alida Claudina de Villiers, during this time.

== Military service ==
He served in a number of military conflicts such as the Sekhukhune Wars of 1876, and later during the First Boer War of 1881, he served as acting field cornet.

He was elected as commandant of the Lydenburg Commando in 1885. When the Second Boer War started, he served as commandant-general in a number of military conflicts, including the battle of Spion Kop and battle of Modder River on 30 October 1899. Burger was criticized for his lack of military prowess during the siege of Ladysmith as well as when the Boer forces withdrew from Spionkop. Afterwards, Burger focused more on his role in government.

== Political career ==
As a politician, he was described as "enlightened and shrewd" and it was reported that he rivaled Paul Kruger in his influence over his countrymen. After the battle of Spion Kop, due to illness, he withdrew from the fighting and pursued his political career once more. He was elected to the Volksraad in 1887. He served as the Chairman of Volksraad from 1895 to 1896

In March 1900, following the death of Piet Joubert, he was elected Vice President under President Paul Kruger. In September 1900, he succeeded Kruger as state president, after Kruger had left for Europe.

During the military tribunal in May 1901, he advocated a cessation of hostilities, but his proposal was strongly opposed by President Marthinus Theunis Steyn of the Orange Free State. Burger remained president until the Treaty of Vereeniging on 31 May 1902.

Following the end of the war, Burger visited Europe, including The Hague. In 1905, Burger became a founding a member of the Het Volk Party and secured an uncontested seat on the Legislative Council. Burger was a delegate of the Transvaal to the National Convention in 1908 which lead to the forming of the Union of South Africa in 1910. After the Union of South Africa was established, Burger became a member of the South African Party under General Louis Botha and rose to Chairman of the Transvaal branch of the South African Party. In 1911, Burger became a member of the Transvaal Executive Committee and following his election to the Senate in 1913, Burger continued to serve as a senator until his death on 5 December 1918.

In Rotterdam, in the Afrikaanderwijk, the Schalk Burgerstraat was named after him.

He died in 1918 at Goedgedacht, near Krugerspos.
