= Spioenkop Dam =

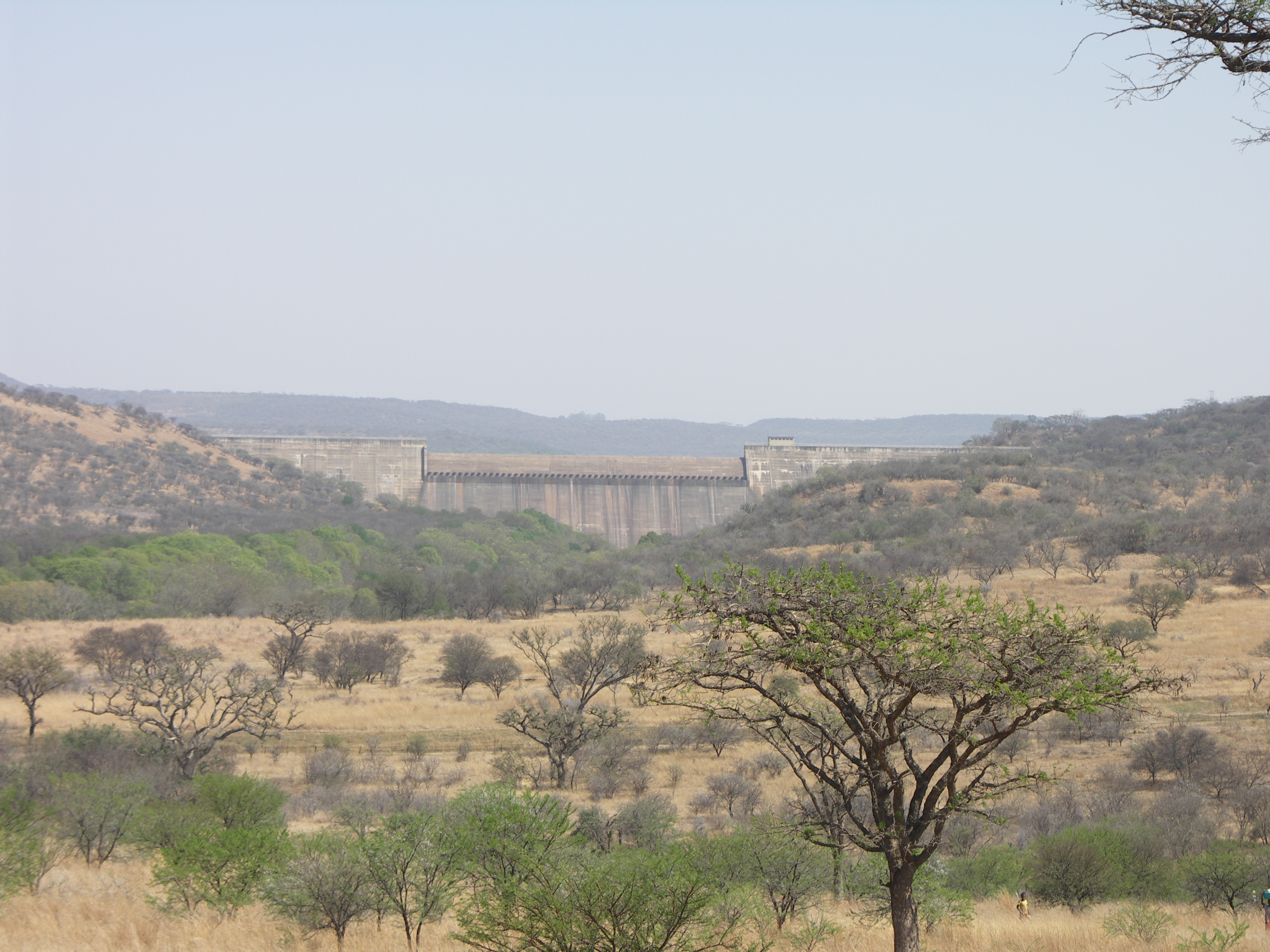
- Spioenkop Dam seen from the R600 road

- Location within South Africa
- Official name: Spioenkop Dam
- Country: South Africa
- Location: KwaZulu-Natal
- Coordinates: 28°41′S 29°31′E
- Purpose: Irrigation
- Opening date: 1972
- Owner: Department of Water Affairs

Dam and spillways
- Type of dam: Earth fill dam
- Impounds: Tugela River
- Height: 53 m (174 ft)

Reservoir
- Creates: Spioenkop Dam Reservoir
- Total capacity: 272,265 megalitres (272.265 hm^{3})
- Catchment area: 2,452 square kilometres (947 mi^{2})
- Surface area: 15.314 km^{2}

Spioenkop Dam impounds the Tugela River in KwaZulu-Natal. It is located within a nature reserve by the same name. The dam was commissioned in 1972, has a capacity of 272,265 cubic metres (9,614,900 cu ft), and a surface area of 15.314 square kilometres (5.913 sq mi), the dam wall is 53 metres (174 ft) high. Spion Kop (hill) is located 2.5 km to the north of the dam.

== See also ==
- Spioenkop Dam Nature Reserve
- Tugela River
