= Spion Kop Battlefield Memorials =

Coordinates: 28°38′54″S 29°31′0″E

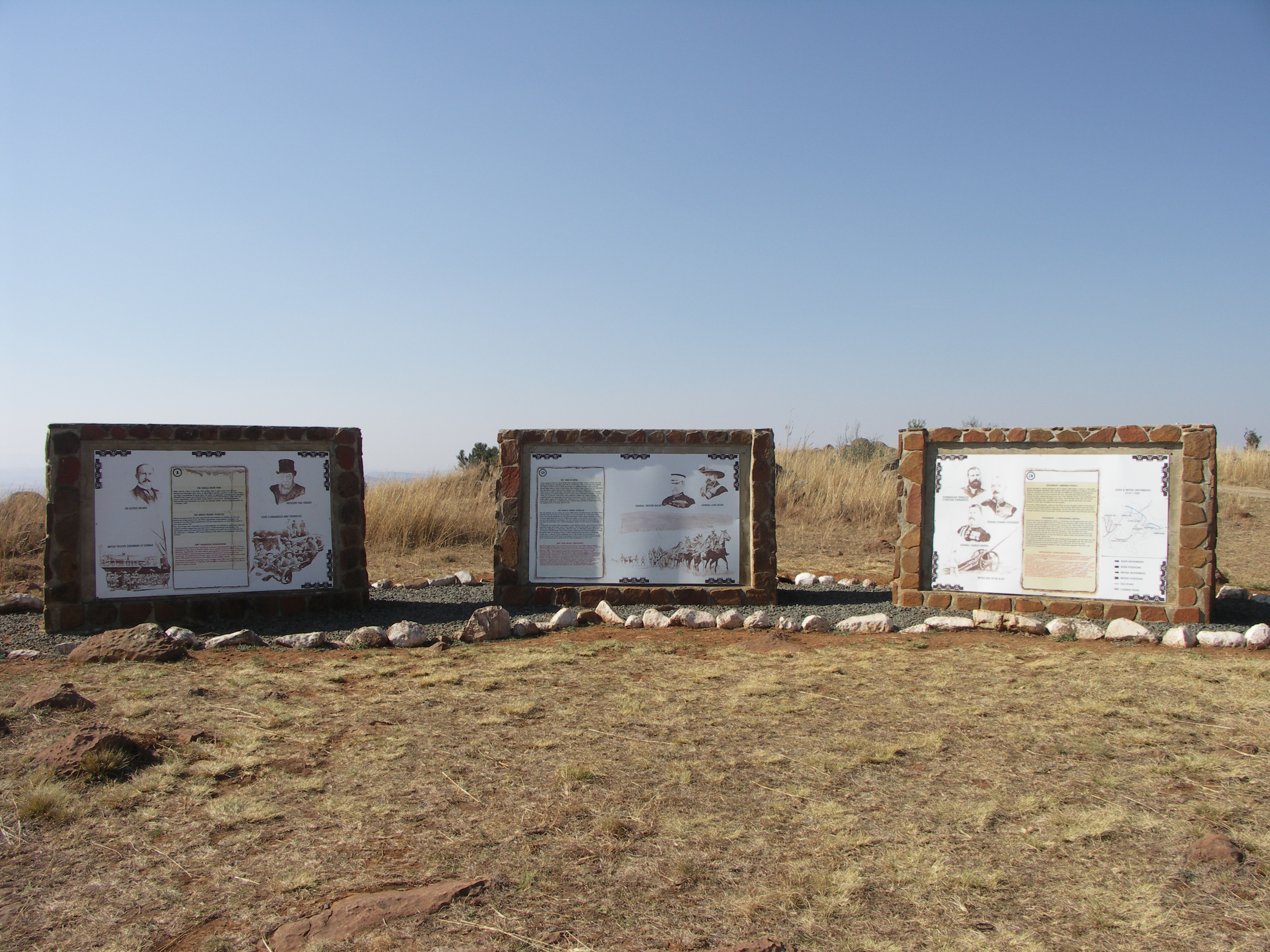
Information signs at the Memorial Site

The Spion Kop Battlefield, graves and memorials are maintained by Heritage KZN. The battlefield was proclaimed as a heritage landmark in 1978. The site is open to the public and an overview of the battle as well as a map of the battlefield is available at the entrance gate.

== Memorials ==
=== Boer memorial ===
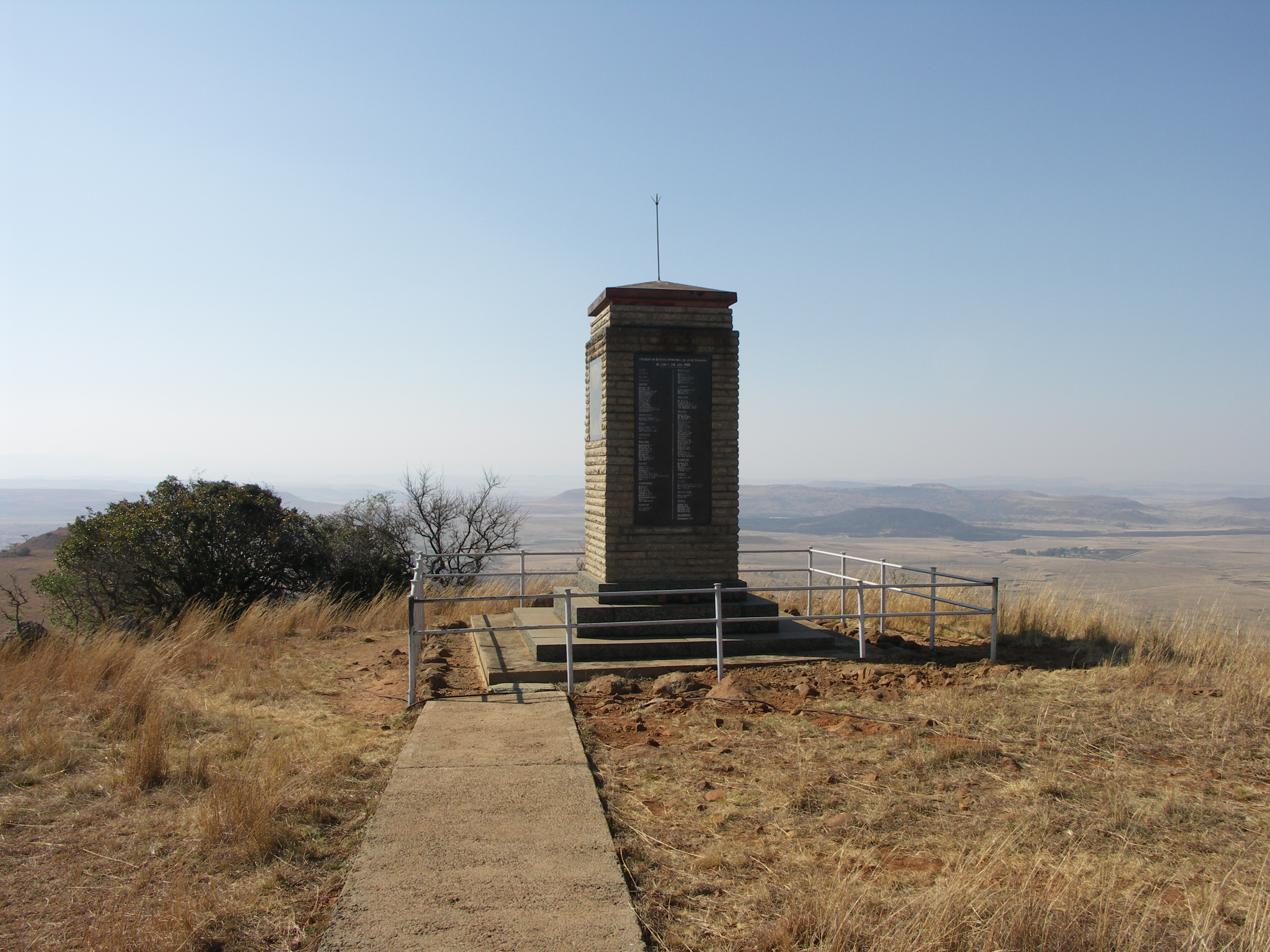
Boer memorial

A stone memorial with four faces erected by the Second Field Force Battalion in remembrance of all Boer Officers and Burghers that died on Spion Kop.

=== British memorial ===
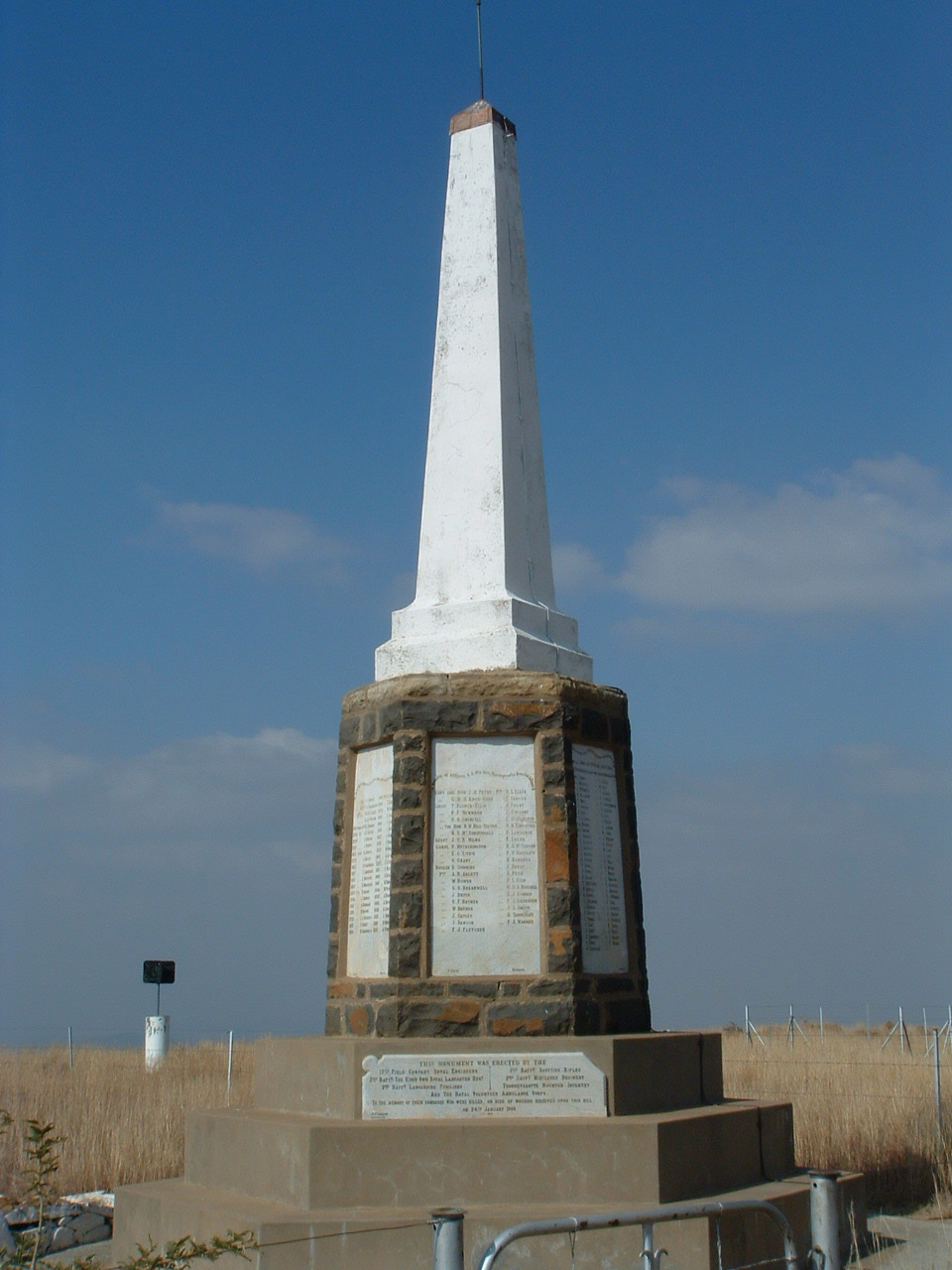
British memorial

This stone memorial has 6 faces dedicated to

- Thorneycrofts Mounted Infantry
- 2nd Battalion, The Kings Own Royal Lancaster Regiment
- Major General Sir Edward Woodgate, the 17th Field Company Royal Engineers, Natal Volunteer Ambulance Corps
- Lancashire Fusiliers
- Scottish Rifles
- Middlesex Regiment

=== Imperial Light Infantry memorial ===
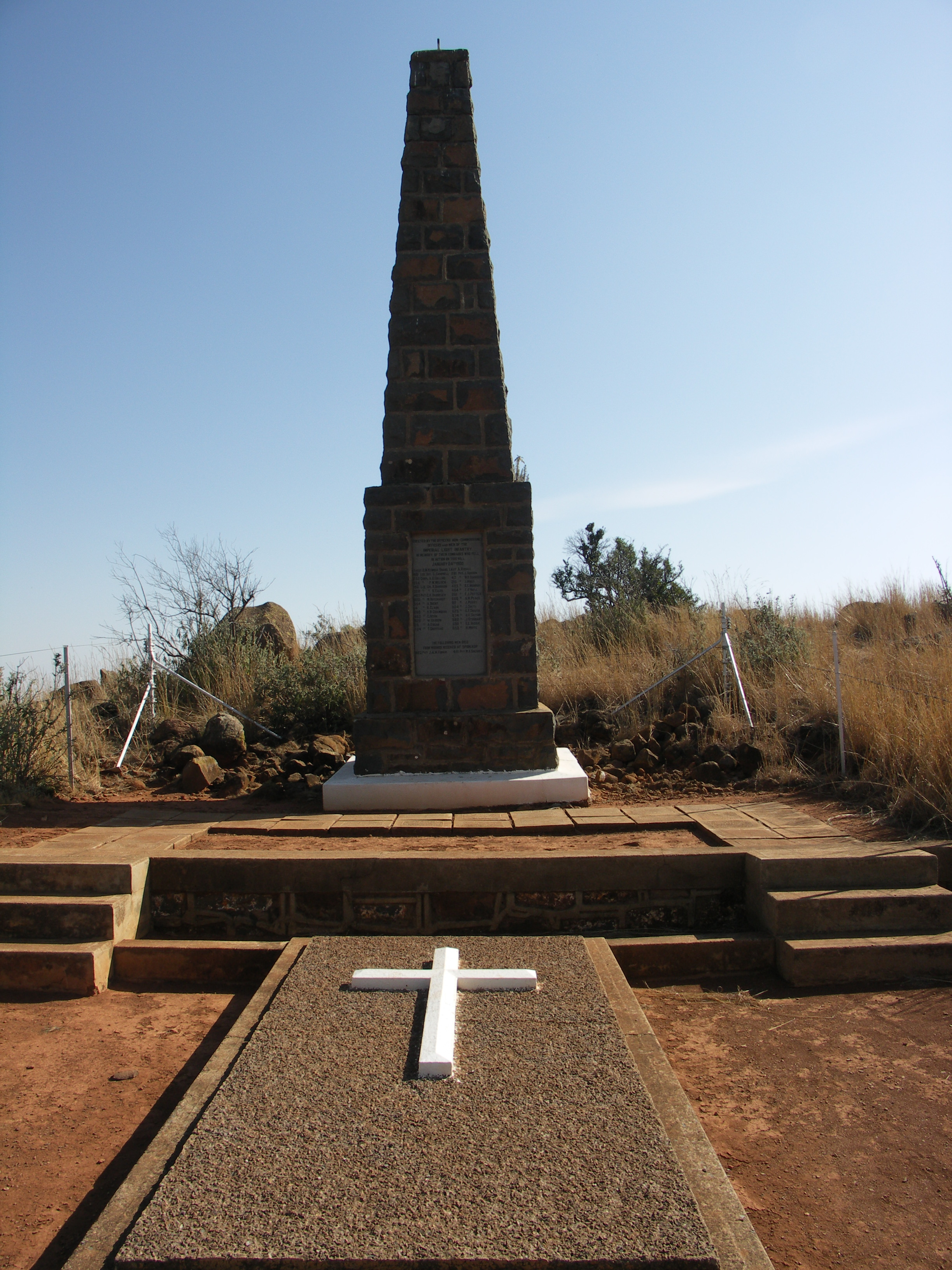
Imperial Light Infantry memorial on Spion Kop

The memorial to men of the Imperial Light Infantry, a unit raised in Natal from men who had lost employment due to the outbreak of the war. The unit lost 19 killed and 105 wounded in the battle.

=== Other ===
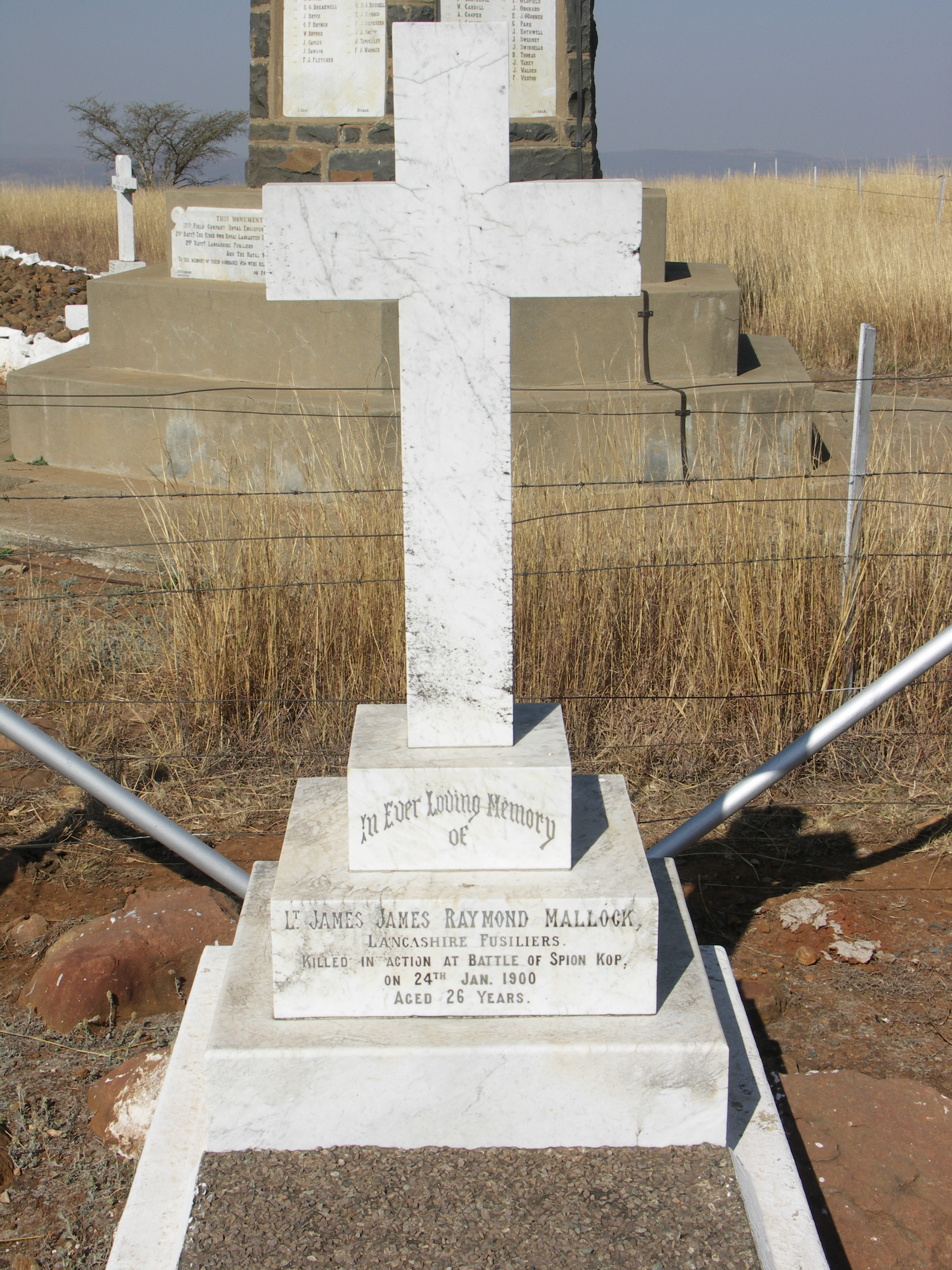
Memorial to James James Raymond Mallock of the Lancashire Fusiliers

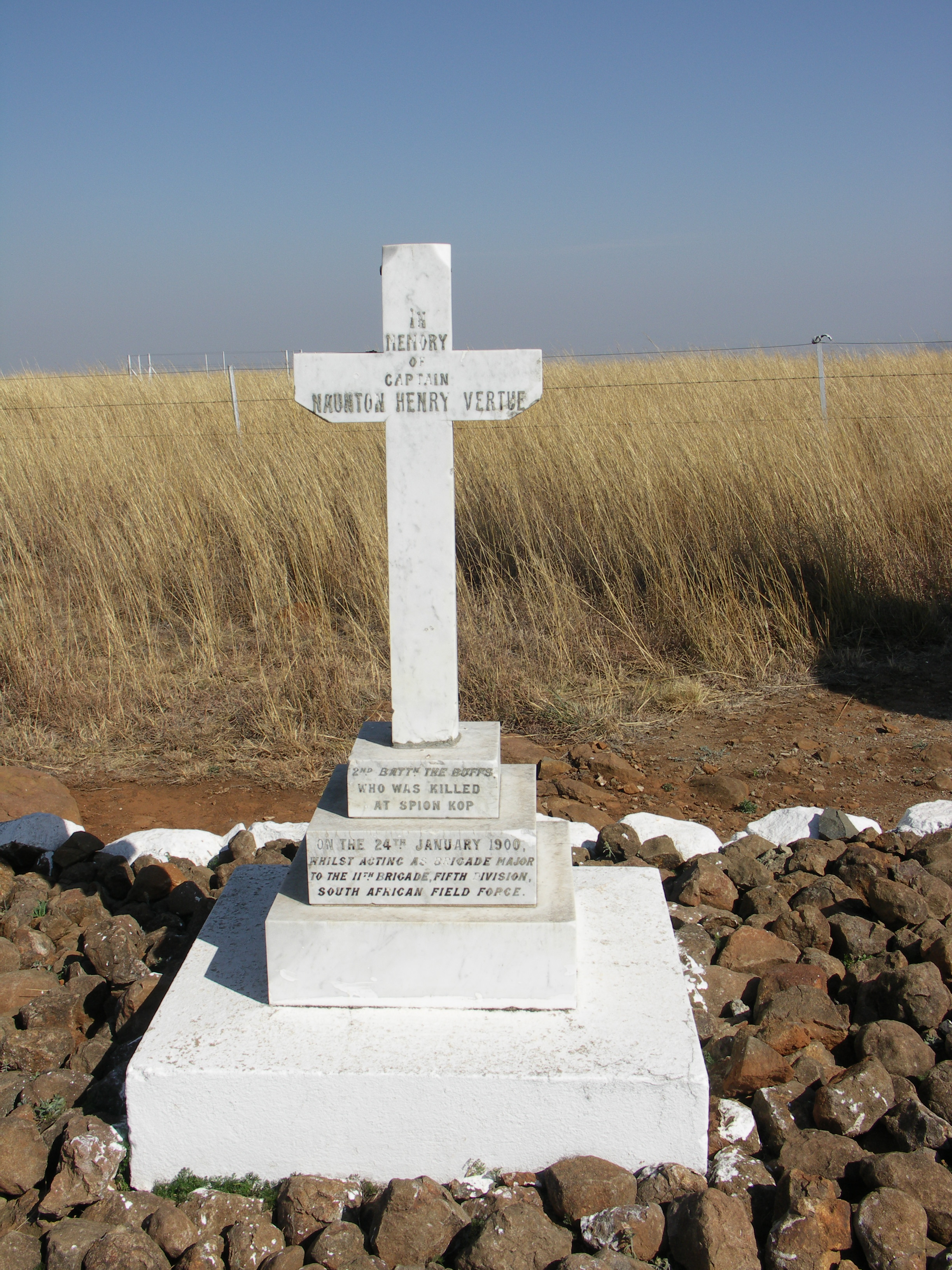
Spion Kop Memorial to Captain Naunton Henry Vertue of the 2nd Battalion, Buffs (East Kent Regiment)

- South Lancasters memorial
- Two mass graves
- A number of individual graves and memorials, including that of Major General Sir Edward Woodgate, the British commander in the field.

== Memorials in planning ==
- Spionkop Lodge, located on the farmstead that Redvers Buller used as headquarters before the Battle of Spion Kop, has recently announced plans to erect a new memorial in remembrance to the Natal Volunteer Ambulance Corps. It is expected that the monument will be unveiled in 2010 with the 110th anniversary of the Battle of Spion Kop.

== Events ==
- The Liverpool supporters club of South Africa commemorates the Hillsborough Disaster on top of Spion Kop every year since 2007.

== See also ==
- Battle of Spion Kop
