= Spion Kop Cemetery =

Cemetery in Hartlepool, County Durham, England

Coordinates: 54°42′25″N 1°12′32″W

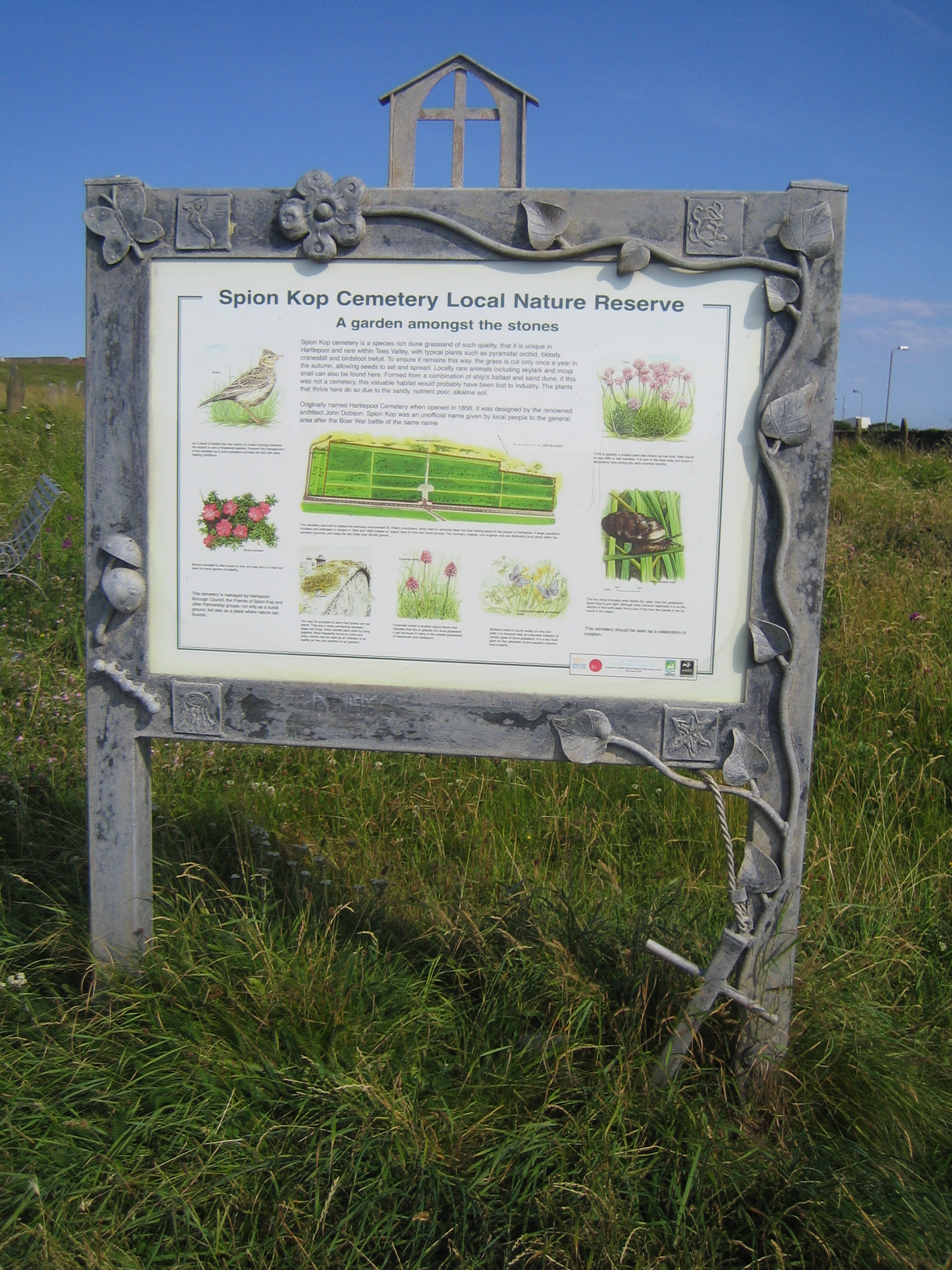
Spion Kop Cemetery notice board

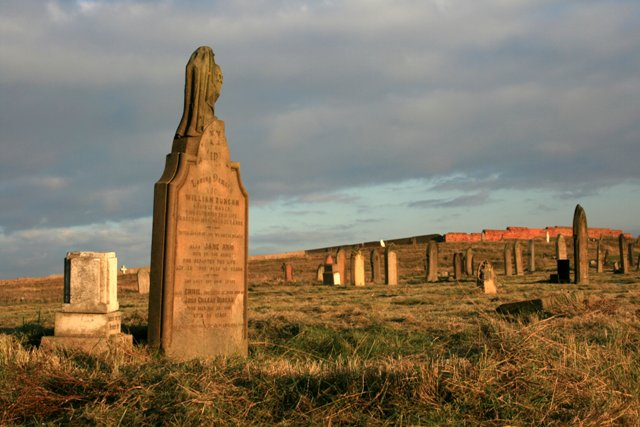
View of Spion Kop Cemetery

Spion Kop Cemetery, originally known as Hartlepool Cemetery, is a disused cemetery on the coast in Hartlepool in England. It was opened in 1856 to replace St Hilda's Church, Hartlepool churchyard and designed by John Dobson. The area took its name from the Battle of Spion Kop in 1900 during the Boer War.

The cemetery was formed from a combination of sand dune and ship's ballast. It is closed to new burials and is now managed as a local nature reserve. Species found there include thrift, the pyramidal orchid, and the lesser meadow-rue.
