= First Reserve Brigade (South Africa) =

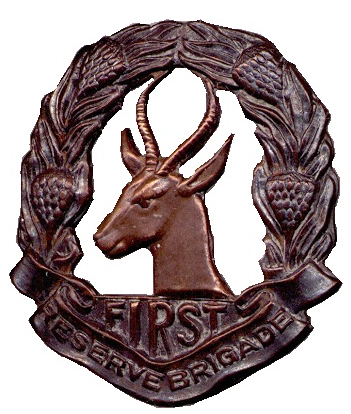
- South African First Reserve Brigade badge
- Active: 1940–1945
- Country: South Africa
- Allegiance: South Africa
- Type: Security of Aerodromes and Internment Camps
- Part of: Brigade
- Garrison/HQ: Johannesburg

During the first two years of World War II, South Africa raised a variety of military units. In order to cope with protection of vulnerable points and guarding prisoners of war, the First Reserve Brigade was formed on 29 February 1940 initially with six battalions but later expanded to twelve battalions before being broken up at the end of 1943.

== Formation and function ==
The First Reserve Brigade was a South African second-line military unit raised in 1940, with brigade headquarters in Johannesburg under Colonel T Scott, who died in August 1941. He was succeeded by Colonel BC Judd OBE. The brigade drafted men of 'B' and 'C' Medical Categories primarily for guard duties at aerodromes. Ex-servicemen and others above the age of 35 but under 60 were accepted, and the brigade was run on a normal Active Citizen Force basis or fulI-time, as authorised. Detachments of the 1st Special Service Reserve Battalion were absorbed as full-time companies or platoons. On 11 July 1940 the SA Internment Battalion was absorbed and redesignated 6th Battalion, 1st Reserve Brigade, with Lt-Col Whelehen as battalion commander. Its primary responsibility was the security of internment camps at Baviaanspoort, which had 150 guards.

The brigade was organised with the 1st Battalion (the former 1st Special Service Reserve Battalion) in the Transvaal, with headquarters at Roberts Heights the 2nd Battalion in the Western Cape Province with its headquarters in Cape Town, the 3rd (Durban) in Natal, the 4th (Johannesburg) on the Witwatersrand and in the Orange Free State and the 5th (East London) in the Eastern Cape Province. Later battalions were the 7th, in the Kimberley district and the Orange Free State, and the 8th, on a basis similar to that of the 6th.

By 1942, after 2,800 men out of a total of 6,061 had been reclassified and transferred to other units, the brigade organisation was dissolved.

The following year four more battalions were formed, some serving in North Africa, while the 1st, 4th, 5th and 8th Battalions were broken up.

Battalion commanders up to 1943 were:

- 1st: Lt-Col G Allen MC
- 2nd: Lt-Col EW Woon DSO MC
- 3rd: Lt-Col J. Lauth DSO VD
- 4th: Lt-Col G. Durham, DSO ED
- 5th: Lt-Col JM Grant
- 6th: Lt-Col F Morland MC
- 7th: Lt-Col HF Champion AFC
- 8th: Lt-Col Hendrik Prinsloo, remembered for the humanitarian manner in which he, as Commandant, ran the Zonderwater Italian POW camp.
- 12th: Lt-Col Dudley Frank Smitheman OBE, ED

At the end of the war the need for the battalions fell away and they were disbanded.
