= Hendrik Frederik Prinsloo (1861–1900) =

Carolina Commando commander (1861–1900)

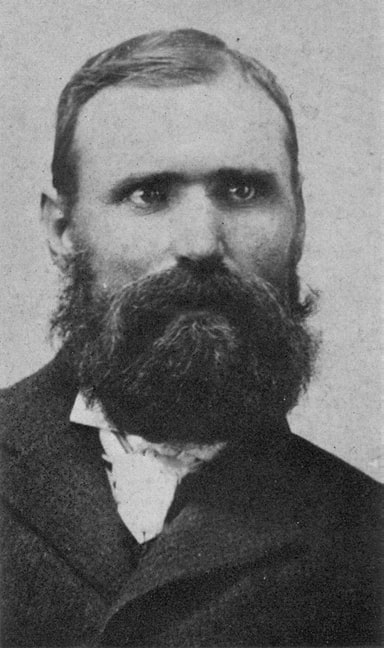
- Born: Hendrik Frederik Prinsloo; 10 May 1861; Kroonstad, Orange Free State
- Died: 7 November 1900 (aged 39); Farm Witkloof, District Carolina, South Africa (now Mpumalanga)
- Military career
- Allegiance: South African Republic
- Rank: Kommandant
- Commands: Carolina Commando
- Conflicts: Second Boer War: Battle of Spion Kop; Battle of Leliefontein

Hendrik Frederik Prinsloo (10 May 1861 – 7 November 1900) was a Second Boer War commander of the Carolina Commando for the South African Republic who fought and prevailed at the Battle of Spion Kop (Afrikaans: Die slag van Spioenkop). His son and namesake Hendrik Frederik Prinsloo (1890–1966) served as an officer in the South African Army in both World War I and World War II.

== Family ==
Prinsloo was born in 1861 Kroonstad, Orange Free State, to Hendrik Frederik Prinsloo (12 May 1834, Albany, Cape Colony, South Africa - 20 March 1897, Marabastad, South African Republic) and Christina Johanna Sophia Dreyer (around 1837, Cape Colony - 4 March 1897, Marabastad) as the second son out of five sons among in total 10 children. He married Cecilia Maria Steyn (22 January 1865, Carolina, South Africa - 28 June 1910, Carolina, South Africa), a daughter of general Johannes Petrus Steyn (1833–1887), and had two daughters and three sons by her. Prinsloo's third child and first son was his namesake Hendrik Frederik Prinsloo (1890–1966).

== Second Boer War ==
At the outbreak of the Second Boer war in 1899, Prinsloo was a field cornet for one of the three wijken (sectors) of Carolina, South Africa. When commander David Joubert stepped down, Prinsloo was chosen as his successor. Prinsloo fought in Natal and commanded Boer troops at the Battle of Spioenkop.

There he was sent in on 24 January 1900 by General Schalk Willem Burger to recapture the strategic hilltop Spionkop near the Tugela River occupied by the British. He invited his soldiers to storm Spioenkop with the words

“Citizens, we are going to the enemy from below and not all will come back. Do your duty and trust in the Lord", "Come Citizens!"

General Louis Botha sent promised reinforcement, and due to Boer artillery support from neighbouring hilltops and Prinsloo's initiative he prevailed over a superior British force.

Later he was killed in action together with general Joachim Christoffel Fourie by the British at Witkloof in the Battle of Leliefontein (Battle of Witkloof), district Carolina, on 7 November 1900. His burgher soldiers felt so dejected by the loss of Prinsloo that they did not pursue the fleeing enemy.

== Literature ==
- A.E., Onze Krijgs-officieren. Album van portretten met levens-schetsen der Transvaalse Generaals en Kommandanten, Volksstem, Pretoria 1904, Pretoria, Volksstem, 1904. In Dutch with a preface by Louis Botha. PDF on Wikimedia Commons.
- Breytenbach, J. H., Die Geskiedenis van die Tweede Vryheidsoorlog in Suid-Afrika, 1899–1902, Die Staatsdrukker Pretoria, 1969–1996. Six volumes in Afrikaans.
  - Breytenbach, J. H. (1973). Die stryd in Natal, Jan. – Feb. 1900 [The battle in Natal, Jan. – Feb. 1900]. Die Geskiedenis van die Tweede Vryheidsoorlog in Suid-Afrika, 1899–1902 (in Afrikaans). Vol. III. Pretoria: Die Staatsdrukker. ISBN 9780797012394. OCLC 612581136..
  - Breytenbach, J. H. (1996). Die beleg van Mafeking tot met die Slag van Bergendal [The siege of Mafeking up to the Battle of Bergendal]. Die Geskiedenis van die Tweede Vryheidsoorlog in Suid-Afrika, 1899-1902 (in Afrikaans). Vol. VI. Pretoria: Die Staatsdrukker. ISBN 9780797033214. OCLC 813492747..
- Du Preez SJ (1977). "Prinsloo, Hendrik Frederik". In Krüger DW, Beyers CJ (eds.). Dictionary of South African Biography Vol III (1st ed.). Cape Town: Tafelberg-Uitgewers. pp. 695–696. ISBN 0624008495. OCLC 1063845175.
- Grobler, J.E.H. (2004). The War Reporter. Jonathan Ball Publishers. ISBN 978-1-86842-186-2
- Pakenham, Thomas, The Boer War, George Weidenfeld & Nicolson, London, 1979. Abacus, 1992. ISBN 0 349 10466 2. General reference and pages 290, 293, and 296 (Battle of Spionkop).
