= Louwrens Penning =

Dutch writer

Louwrens Penning (Waardhuizen, 2 December 1854 - Utrecht, 12 January 1927) was a popular Dutch novelist. He was best known for his patriotic novels romanticising the Boer struggles with the British and Zulus in South Africa, even though at the time he wrote them, like Edgar Rice Burroughs and Karl May he had never travelled to the countries he described. Although viewed as having little literary value by contemporary literary historians, they were wildly popular in the Netherlands and continued to be in demand into the 1960s. His best known work De held van Spionkop (1901) told the story of the real Louis Wessels, leader of the Boer commandos at the Battle of Spion Kop.
