= Carolina Commando =

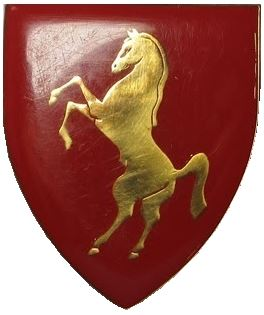
- Carolina Commando emblem
- Country: South Africa
- Allegiance: (South African Republic) Zuid-Afrikaansche Republiek; Union of South Africa; Republic of South Africa; Republic of South Africa
- Branch: South African Army; South African Army
- Type: Infantry
- Role: Light Infantry
- Size: One Battalion
- Part of: South African Infantry Corps; Army Territorial Reserve
- Garrison/HQ: Carolina, South Africa
- Motto: Altyd Getrou (Always Loyal)
- Battle honours: Modjadji 1890, Anglo-Boer War 1899-1902, Mpefu 1898, South West Africa 1914-1915

Carolina Commando was a light infantry regiment of the South African Army for the district of Carolina, South Africa. It formed part of the South African Army Infantry Formation as well as the South African Territorial Reserve.

== History ==
=== Origin ===
Previously a part of the Lydenburg Commando, Carolina Commando was formed around 1859.

=== Operations ===
==== With the Zuid-Afrikaansche Republiek ====
During the Zuid-Afrikaansche Republiek the first engagements of the Carolina Commando included:

- Opposing the Jameson Raid in 1896, and
- The war against Mphephu (1897–1898).

The commando was involved in the following engagements in the Anglo-Boer War (1899-1902):

- The Battle of Modderspruit (Lombard's Kop or Farquhar's Farm) on 24 October 1899.
- The Battle of Platrand on 6 January 1900. The Carolina Commando attacked Ladysmith to prevent reinforcements from being sent to Platrand.
- The Battle of Spioenkop on 23–24 January 1900 where the Commando formed part of the reserve.
- The Carolina and Lydenburg Commandos defended Botha's Pass (on the road between Memel and Newcastle in KwaZulu-Natal) on 6 June 1900.
- The Battle of Bergendal on 21–27 August 1900.
- The remaining members laid down the arms at the farm Twyfelaar in June 1902.

==== With the Union Defence Force ====
By 1902 all Commando remnants were under British military control and disarmed.

By 1912, however previous Commando members could join shooting associations.

By 1940, such commandos were under control of the National Reserve of Volunteers.

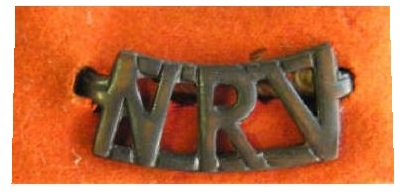
Union Defence Force (UDF) era National Reserve of Volunteers shoulder tab

These commandos were formally reactivated by 1948.

==== With the South African Defence Force ====
Under the South African Defence Force (SADF), this Commando was seconded to Group 28's Command. It was utilised in the area protection role.

==== With the South African National Defence Force ====
Under the South African National Defence Force (SANDF) its Group 12 situated in Ermelo, Mpumalanga made use of the commandos at Carolina, Ermelo and Piet Retief for some borderline functions.

===== Disbandment =====
This unit, along with all other Commando units was disbanded after a decision by South African President Thabo Mbeki to disband all of them. The Commando system was phased out between 2003 and 2008 "because of the role it played in the apartheid era", according to the Minister of Safety and Security Charles Nqakula.

== Unit Insignia ==
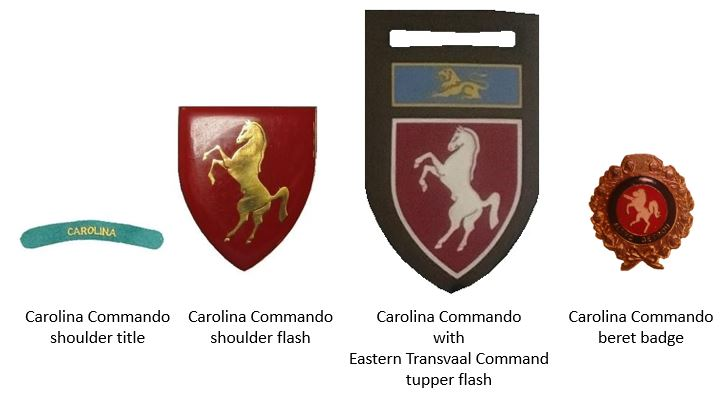
South African Defence Force (SADF) era Carolina Commando insignia.

== Leadership ==
Leadership
From	Honorary Colonels	To	Ribbon
	No known incumbents		
From	Officer Commanding	To	Ribbon
1895	Cmdt David Johannes Joubert (1849–1903)	c. nd	
1898	Cmdt Hendrik Frederik Prinsloo (1861–1900)	c. nd	
From	Regimental Sergeant Major	To	Ribbon
	No known incumbents		

== See also ==
- South African Commando System
