= Krugerspos =

- Location within Mpumalanga Location within South Africa
- Coordinates: 24.907°S 30.533°E
- Country: South Africa
- Province: Mpumalanga
- District: Ehlanzeni
- Municipality: Thaba Chweu
- Time zone: UTC+2 (SAST)

Krugerspos is a hamlet 25 km north-east of Lydenburg and 25 km south-west of Ohrigstad. It was named after Pieter Ernst Kruger, owner of the farm on which it was laid out.
