= Military Heritage =

- April 2005 issue
- Editor: William Welsh
- Frequency: Bimonthly
- Founded: 1999
- Company: Sovereign Media
- Country: United States
- Based in: Reston, Virginia
- Language: English
- Website: www.militaryheritagemagazine.com
- ISSN: 1524-8666

Military Heritage is an American glossy, bi-monthly military history magazine that was first published in August 1999 by Sovereign Media. It was founded by Carl A. Gnam Jr., who also serves as the editorial director. The current magazine editor is William Welsh. The magazine is headquartered in Reston, Virginia.

The feature articles focus on historical battles or campaigns, and describe the context in which the conflict was fought. They will typically include several illustrations and a brief bibliography for further reading. There can also be articles on military leaders, weapons, eyewitness accounts, and other war-related topics. The articles cover a diverse range of historical periods and conflicts. The magazine also includes an editorial page and brief reviews of history books and simulations. The illustrations include maps, museum artwork, and, when available, photographs.
