= Edward Woodgate =

British army general killed in the Second Boer War (1845-1900)

Major-General Sir Edward Woodgate KCMG CB
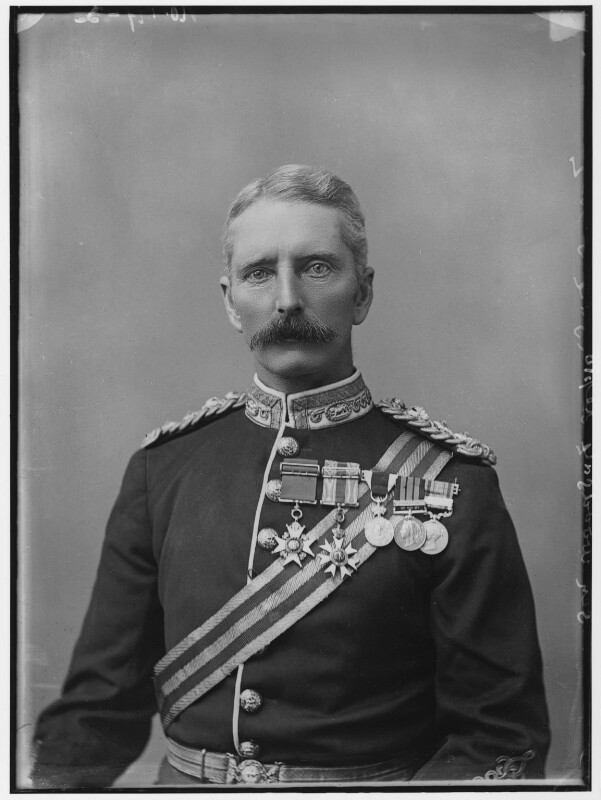
- Born: Edward Robert Prevost Woodgate; 1 November 1845; Belbroughton, United Kingdom
- Died: 23 March 1900 (aged 54); Mooi River, Colony of Natal, British Empire
- Burial place: St John's Anglican Church, just outside Mooi River
- Education: Radley College
- Military career
- Allegiance: (United Kingdom) British Empire
- Branch: British Army
- Service years: 1865–1900
- Rank: Major-General
- Unit: King's Own (Royal Lancaster Regiment)
- Commands: 9th Brigade of the 5th Division
- Conflicts: Abyssinian War; Anglo-Ashanti wars Anglo-Zulu War; Second Boer War: Battle of Spion Kop †
- Awards: Mentioned in Dispatches; Knight Grand Cross of the Order of St Michael and St George; Order of the Bath

Sir Edward Robert Prevost Woodgate KCMG CB (1 November 1845 – 23 March 1900) was an infantry officer in the British Army.

== Family and education ==
Woodgate was born in November 1845 at Belbroughton, Worcestershire, the son of Rev Henry Arthur Woodgate, Rector of Holy Trinity parish church there. He was educated at Radley College in Berkshire (now Oxfordshire).

== Career ==
In April 1865 Woodgate was commissioned into the 4th (King's Own) Regiment of Foot, which in 1881 was renamed the King's Own (Royal Lancaster Regiment). He served in the Abyssinian War 1868 (and was present at the action of Arogee and the capture of Magdala), then the Ashanti War from 1873 to 1874 (where he took part in the actions of Esaman, Ainsah, Abrakampa, and Faysunah, the battle of Amoaful, and the capture of Kumassi), for which he was mentioned in despatches. After Staff College in 1877, he took part in the Anglo-Zulu War 1879, where he was again mentioned in despatches for his work as staff officer of the Flying column in the campaign, and received a brevet promotion to major. From 1880 to 1885 he served as a brigade major in the West Indies, subsequently returning to regimental duties. In 1893 he was appointed in command of the 1st battalion of his regiment, and in 1897 he relinquished this position to take charge of the 4th Regimental District at Lancaster. Less than a year later, he was in April 1898 specially sent to Sierra Leone to organize the new West African Regiment (later reorganized into the West African Field Force), which soon was involved in fighting against Bai Bureh. By now a colonel, Woodgate returned hom in 1899 to take command of the 17th District at Leicester.

He had only held the Leicester-command four months, when after the outbreak of the Second Boer War he was appointed in command of the 11th brigade of the 5th Division. At the Battle of Spion Kop he commanded a large force that was sent to capture the strategic hill in a night assault on 23 January 1900. The next morning a shell splinter struck Woodgate's head above the right eye. He suffered a brain injury associated with a shattered orbit. While being carried down the hill to hospital on a stretcher, he struggled to rejoin his men and had to be forcibly restrained. As a result of the trauma he lost all recent memory and had no recollection of the war.

Woodgate later fell into a coma and died at Mooi River, Natal on 23 March 1900, aged 54. He is buried in the churchyard of St John's Anglican Church just outside Mooi River.

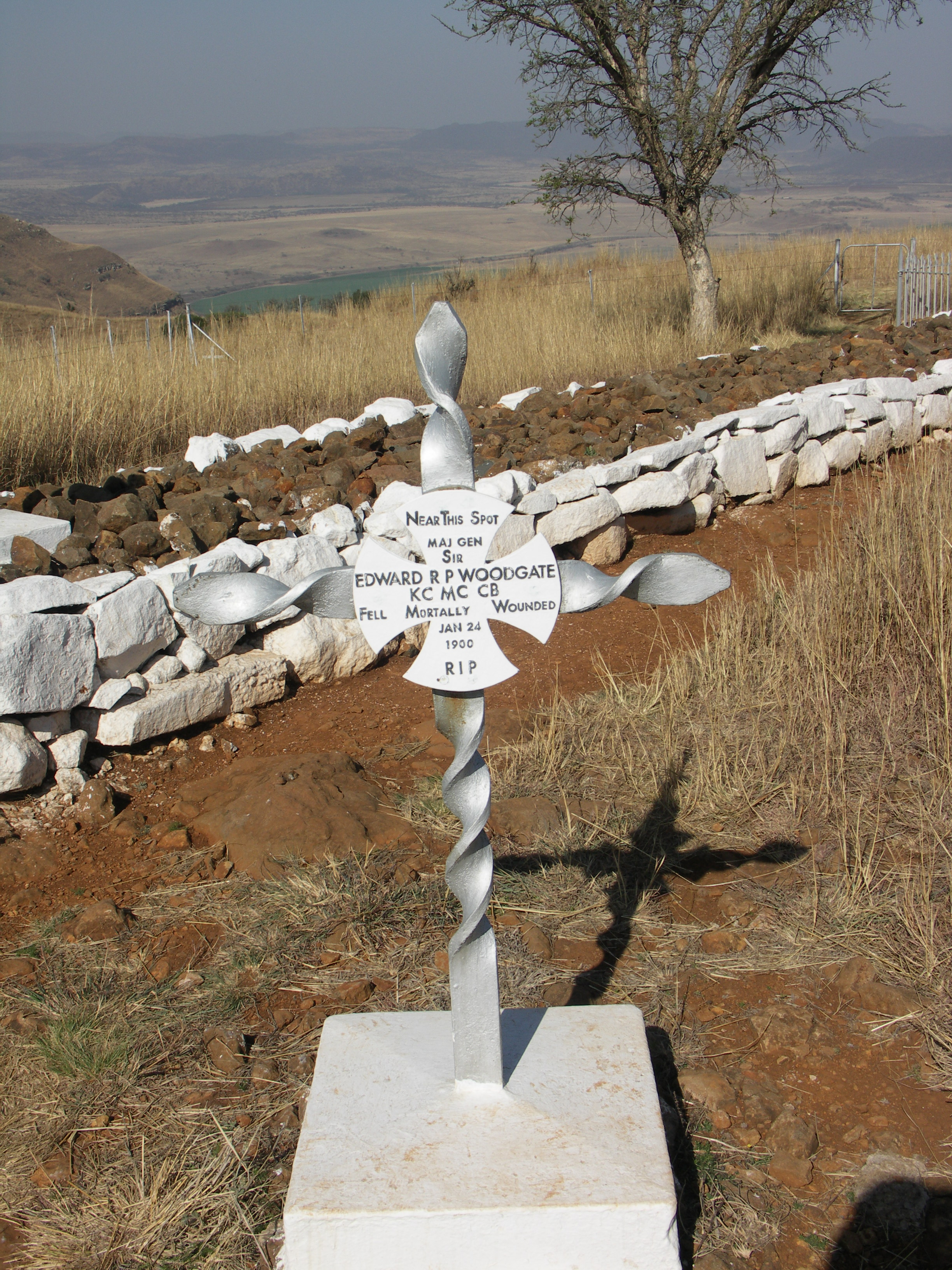
Monument to Edward Woodgate at Spion Kop

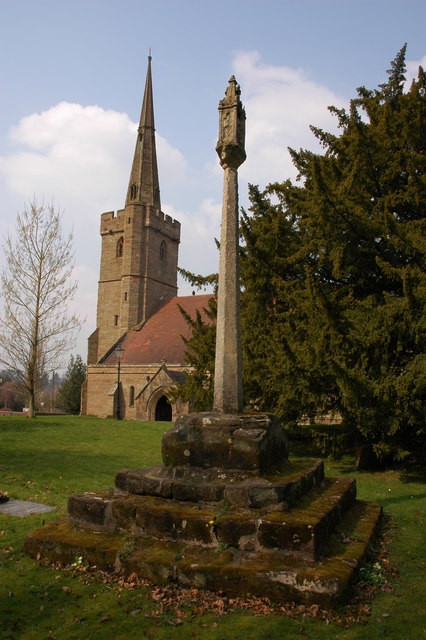
Medieval churchyard cross in Belbroughton churchyard, Worcestershire, restored as a monument to Woodgate

Woodgate left a fiancée, Gladys Newbolt. At his birthplace in Belbroughton the Medieval churchyard cross was restored as a monument to him.

== Honours and awards ==
Abyssinian War Medal (1868) Ashanti War Medal (1873–4) and bar and mentioned in dispatches, Zulu War Campaign Medal (1879) and bar and mentioned in despatches, Sierra Leone 1898 and mentioned in despatches, invested as a Companion of the Order of St Michael and St George (CMG). He was invested as a Companion of the Order of the Bath (CB) in May 1896 and Knight Commander in Order of St Michael and St George (KCMG) in January 1900.

== Estate ==
Woodgate's will was proved in the Principal Registry of the Probate Division of Her Majesty's High Court of Justice on 30 June 1900, by his two executors, Lieutenant-Colonel Edward De Barry Barnett of 32 Cambridge Square, Hyde Park, London and George Nicholas Hardinge of 17 Lower Berkeley Street, London. His home address was given as United Service Club, Pall Mall, London
