= Lydenburg Commando =

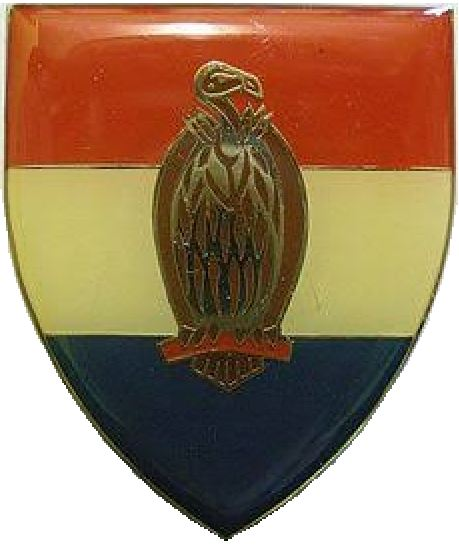
- Lydenburg Commando emblem
- Country: South Africa
- Allegiance: South African Republic; Union of South Africa; Republic of South Africa; Republic of South Africa
- Branch: South African Army; South African Army
- Type: Infantry
- Role: Light Infantry
- Size: One Battalion
- Part of: South African Infantry Corps; Army Territorial Reserve
- Garrison/HQ: Lydenburg

Lydenburg Commando was a light infantry regiment of the South African Army. It formed part of the South African Army Infantry Formation as well as the South African Territorial Reserve.

== History ==
=== Operations ===
==== With the Zuid Afrikaanse Republiek ====
This Commando was involved in several engagement during the Anglo Boer such as:

- The battle of Bergendal

==== With the UDF ====
By 1902 all Commando remnants were under British military control and disarmed.

By 1912, however previous Commando members could join shooting associations.

===== Rebel Commando =====
During the 1914 Maritz Rebellion, Christiaan De Wet remustered this Commando against the government of the day.

===== Volunteer Reserve =====
By 1940, such commandos were under control of the National Reserve of Volunteers.

These commandos were formally reactivated by 1948.

==== With the SADF ====
During this era, the unit was mainly used for area force protection, search and cordones as well as stock theft control assistance to the rural police.

==== With the SANDF ====
===== Disbandment =====
This unit, along with all other Commando units was disbanded after a decision by South African President Thabo Mbeki to disband all Commando Units. The Commando system was phased out between 2003 and 2008 "because of the role it played in the apartheid era", according to the Minister of Safety and Security Charles Nqakula.

== Unit Insignia ==
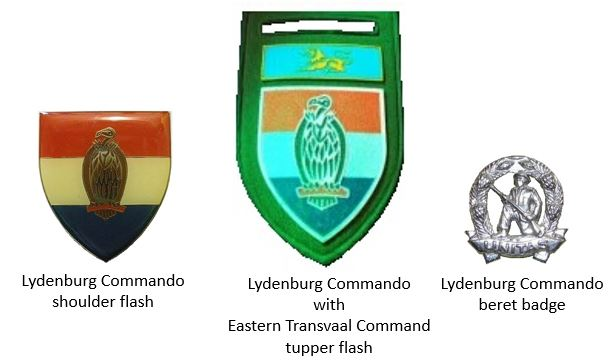
SADF era Lydenburg Commando insignia

== See also ==
- South African Commando System
