= Mount Hermon Cemetery =

Mount Hermon Cemetery National Historic Site of Canada
- Lieu historique national du Canada du cimetière Mount Hermon (French)
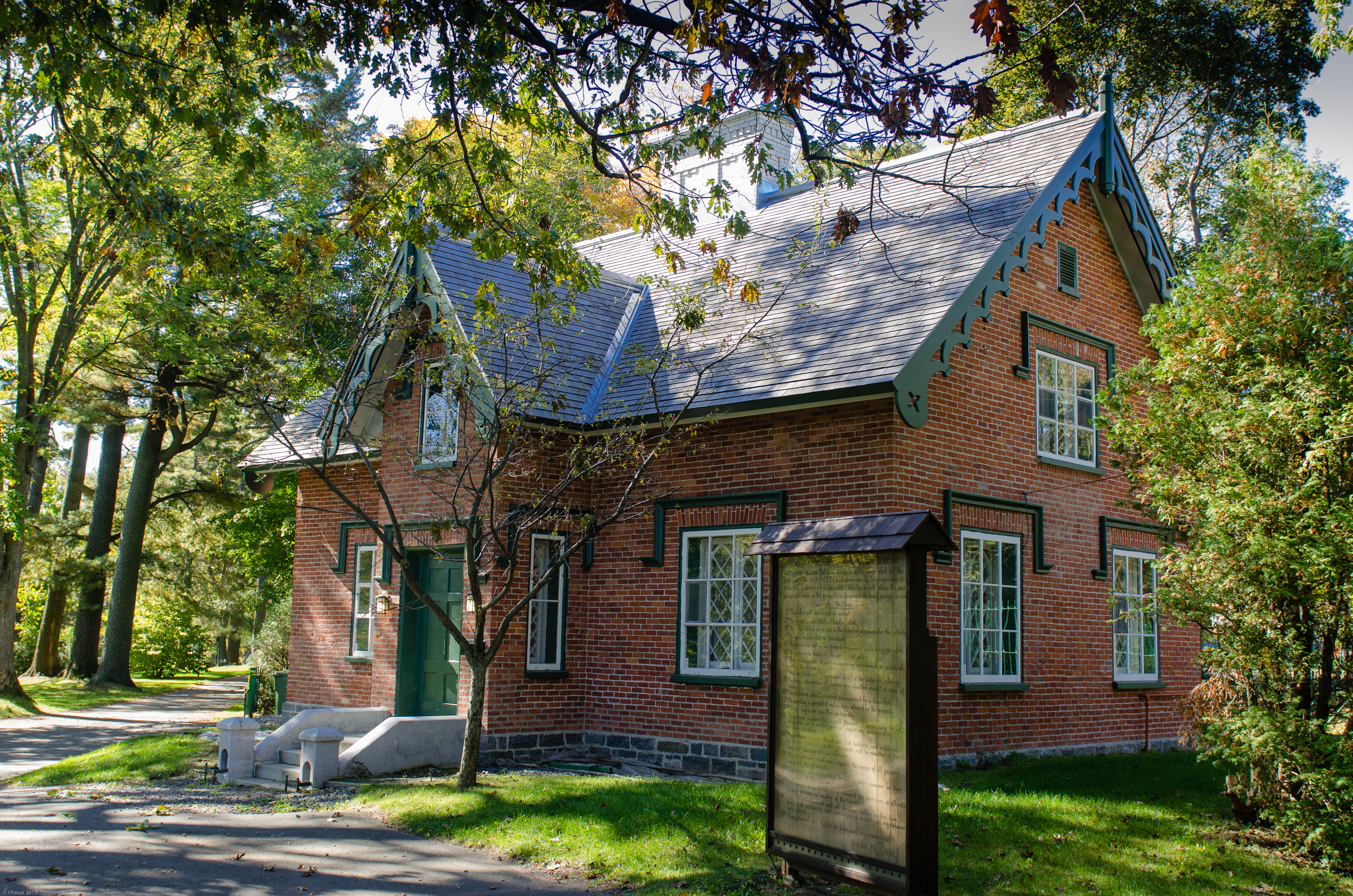
- Entrance lodge
- Interactive map of Mount Hermon Cemetery National Historic Site of Canada
- 46°46′43″N 71°14′48″W
- Type: National Historic Site of Canada
- Location: Quebec City, Quebec, Canada

History
- Incorporated: 30 May 1849
- Founded: February 11, 1848; 178 years ago
- Founder: John Gilmour; George O’Kill Stuart, Jr.; Jeffery Hale; Dr. James Douglas
- Built: 1848
- Built for: Quebec City's Anglican community
- Original use: Cemetery

Site notes
- Elevation: 60 m (196.85 ft)
- Area: 11 hectares (26 acres)
- Architects: David Bates Douglass (landscape); Edward Staveley (lodge and gates)
- Architectural styles: Garden cemetery; Gothic-Revival lodge
- Restored: 2011
- Restored by: Construction Couture & Tanguay inc.
- Current use: Cemetery
- Owner: Mount Hermon Cemetery Association
- Website: www.mounthermoncemetery.com

National Historic Site of Canada
- Official name: Mount Hermon Cemetery National Historic Site of Canada
- Type: National Historic Site of Canada
- Designated: 8 June 2007
- Reference no.: 11837

Mount Hermon Cemetery (French: Cimetière du Mont Hermon) is a garden (or rural) cemetery and National Historic Site of Canada. It is located in the Sillery district (French: quartier) of the Sainte-Foy–Sillery–Cap-Rouge borough (French: arrondissement) of Quebec City, Quebec, Canada. The cemetery was designated a National Historic Site of Canada in 2007.

The impetus for the creation of the 11-hectare (26-acre) cemetery was the need for the provision of a Protestant burying ground for Quebec City's primarily English language speaking, Protestant community, in the mid–1800s.

The cemetery is located at the corner of Saint-Louis Road (French: chemin Saint-Louis) and côte de Sillery (formerly côte de l'Église), on 109,010 m^{2} (0.042 mi^{2}) of land overlooking the Saint Lawrence River, in the southeastern direction.

More than 17,000 people are buried at Mount Hermon Cemetery. This cemetery draws distinction as being the first garden cemetery (French: cimetière-jardin) established in Canada. Mount Hermon Cemetery, and other garden cemeteries formed in North America, took inspiration from cimetière du Père-Lachaise of Paris.

A memorial was dedicated to the victims of the sinking of the shipwrecked Empress of Ireland, in 1914, and other memorials were erected at later dates on the cemetery's grounds. The major loss of lives aboard the shipwrecked Empress of Ireland had significant impact upon Mount Hermon Cemetery, along with its neighboring cemetery on chemin Saint-Louis: Saint-Patrick's Cemetery, which also relocated from the city of Quebec, in 1879. Both of the cemeteries took on responsibility for a significant number of the ship's passengers whom perished aboard or at sea.

Separately, on the Mount Hermon Cemetery grounds is the Treggett Bell, which was presented in gratitude to the Treggett family, who had members from four different generations of its family serve as Mount Hermon Cemetery's Superintendents, encompassing the years 1865–2014.

In addition, the cemetery contains sections dedicated for individuals of Greek (French: section de la communauté grecque orthodoxe), Chinese (French: section de la communauté chinoise), and Cambodian (French: lots des cambodgiens) descent.

The main entrance is accessed at 1801 Saint-Louis Road, at the northern end of the cemetery. There is a pedestrian entrance located at the southwestern portion of the cemetery, accessed at the northern terminus of avenue des Voiliers, one-block east of côte de Sillery. The cemetery grounds contained both paved and gravel roads but has been entirely paved in 2023 with the exception of one dirt road at the bottom leading to the Québec Promontory.

== Origins ==
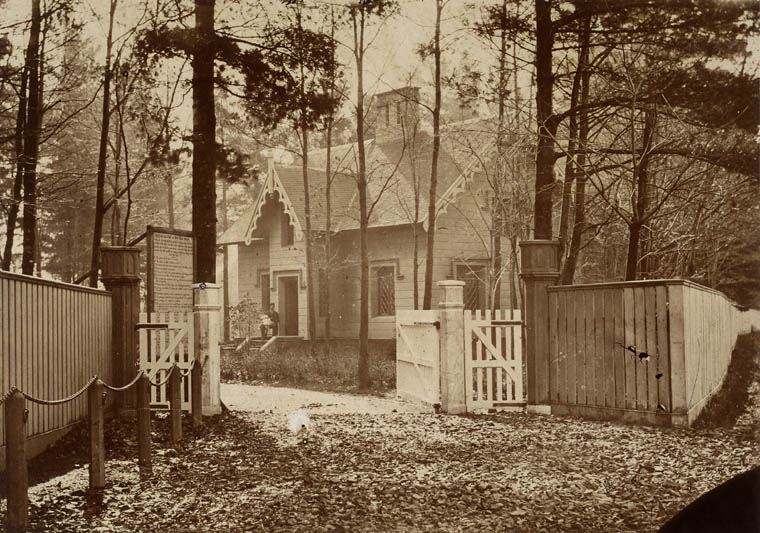
Albumen print of entrance, October 1858–1880, by Samuel McLaughlin.

In the spring of 1847, a group of Protestant businessmen, shipbuilders, merchants, and clergy convened a public meeting to determine the possibility of buying land for a rural cemetery. Quebec City's original Anglican cemetery, located adjacent to Saint Matthew's Church on Saint John Street (French: rue Saint-Jean) had reached its capacity and city officials requested that a new Protestant cemetery be established outside of the city limits.

With aid from the lumber merchant John Gilmour, a prominent member of the local Protestant community, as well as a member of first municipal council of Sillery, the Québec Protestant Cemetery Association was formed on February 11, 1848. Its first president was George O'Kill Stuart, Jr., and its main objective was to collect the funds necessary to purchase land and establish a cemetery on it. Other founding members included the philanthropist Jeffery Hale and the physician Dr. James Douglas, the later whom served as a member of the cemetery's first board of directors in 1848.

On June 14, 1848, Christopher Ferguson, 42-years of age, who was the master of the brig Transit, died of erysipelas. He became the first person to be buried in the nascent cemetery and the first person to be recorded in the cemetery's burial register. The only other details recorded were that he was a member of the Church of England and that the officiating clergyman was the Rev. J. Cornwall.

The legislation (12 Vict., chap. 191) which legally incorporated the new cemetery was adopted by the Legislative Assembly of the Province of Canada on May 30, 1849. It was at that time that the new cemetery was officially given the name of Mount Hermon.

The membership of the association's first board of directors was noted for being an example of ecumenical cooperation in the overwhelmingly Roman Catholic majority city and province of Quebec. Between June 1848 and December 1883, out of 6,164 burials, close to half of the decedents were members of the Anglican Church (2,991), followed by members of the Presbyterian Church (1,117), and the Methodist Church (583).

== Cemetery design ==
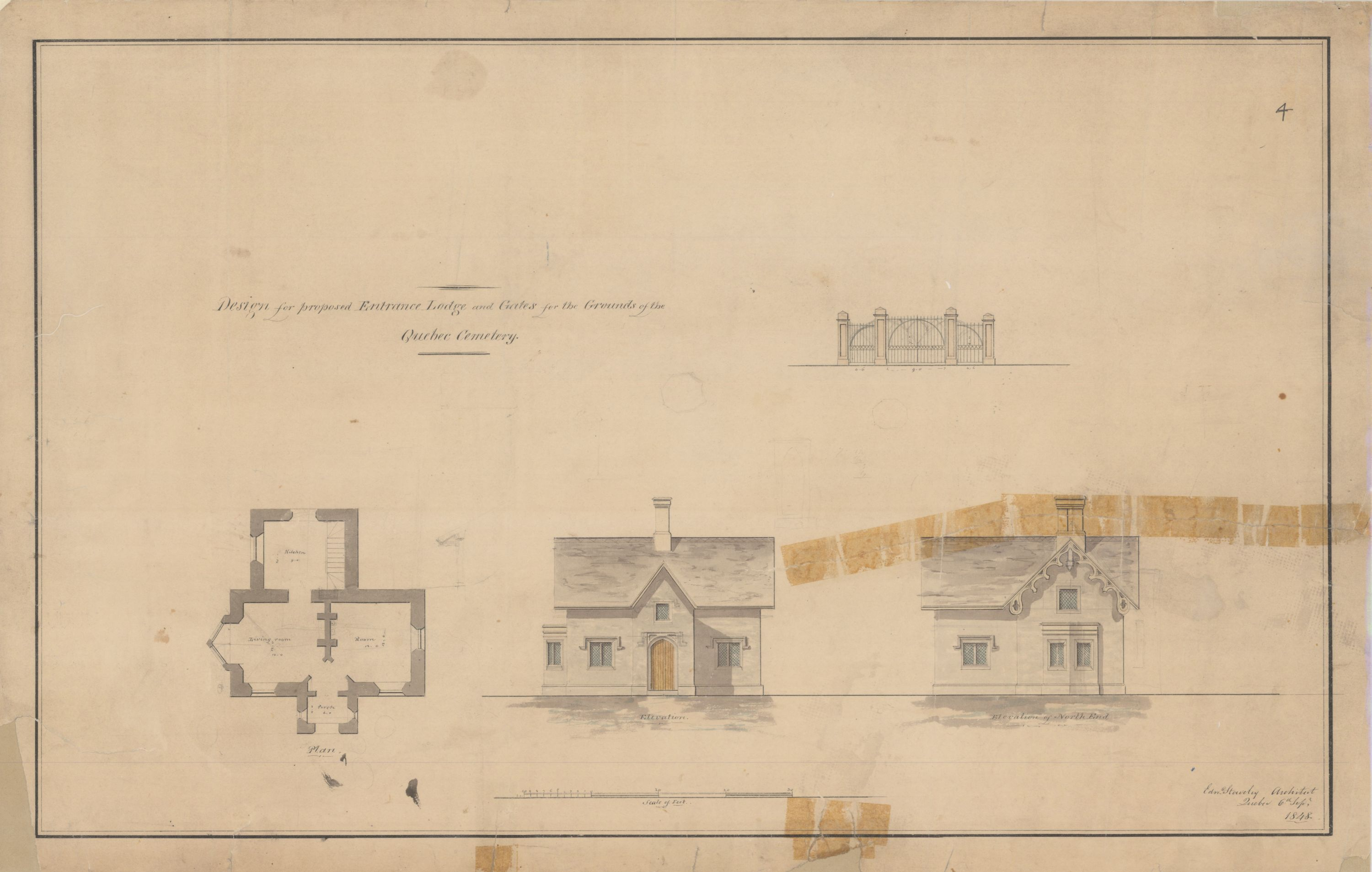
"Design for proposed entrance lodge and gates for the grounds of the Quebec Cemetery," Edward Staveley, September 6, 1848, Quebec City

An American civil and military engineer, David Bates Douglass, designed the layout of Mount Hermon Cemetery, in 1848. Douglass, who garnered acclamations for his 1838–1839 design of Green-Wood Cemetery, as a landscape of "bucolic serenity" in Brooklyn, New York, modeled both Albany Rural Cemetery (1845–1846), located on the outskirts of Albany, New York, and Mount Hermon Cemetery, after Green-Wood.

All three of Douglass' cemeteries were designed from the philosophical perspective of the architect Sir Christopher Wren, who in the year 1711, began to argue for cemeteries to be located in pastoral settings, away from crowded and disease-plagued cities. The three David Bates Douglass designed garden cemetery landscapes all have achieved historic and cultural landmark statuses: in addition to Mount Hermon Cemetery's designation as a National Historic Site of Canada, his Green-Wood Cemetery was designated a United States National Historic Landmark in 2006, and his Albany Rural Cemetery was placed on the U.S. National Register of Historic Places in 1979.

Québec City architect Edward Staveley (1795–1872) designed the cemetery's Gothic Revival entrance lodge and gates in a set of plans which were signed and dated on September 6, 1848, in the city of Québec. On August 24, 1849, Staveley completed a design plan for a burial vault at Mount Hermon Cemetery for the family of the Hon. Henry Black.

At the time of its establishment, Mount Hermon was the first cemetery to be located in a rural area, outside of Québec City's legal jurisdiction, in addition to being Canada's first garden cemetery. On July 10, 1859, the Roman Catholic Notre-Dame-de-Belmont Cemetery (French: cimetière Notre-Dame-de-Belmont), located in the adjacent, historic area of Sainte-Foy, was blessed and its first burial took place two days later. This was the second garden cemetery to be created in a rural environment outside of the city limits of Québec.

== Historic recognition and status ==
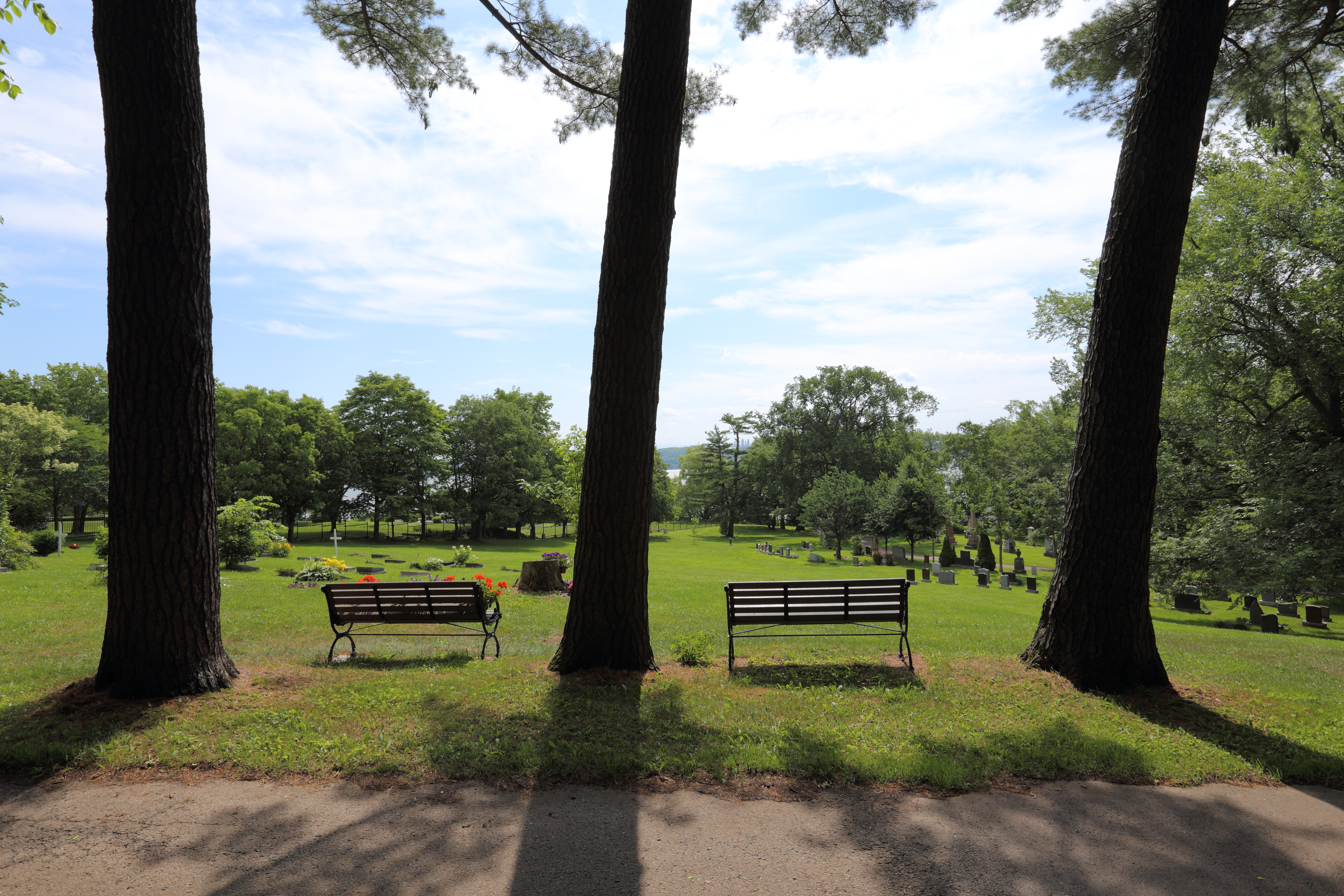
"Park-like space for public use"

On June 8, 2007, Mount Hermon Cemetery was officially recognized as a National Historic Site of Canada. Additionally, the cemetery is located on the Sillery Heritage Site, which was designated as a historic district in 1964. On April 24, 2009, Parks Canada listed Mount Hermon Cemetery on the Canadian Register of Historic Places (Canada's Historic Places), which it administers.

Amongst other attributes, the Historic Sites and Monuments Board of Canada noted the heritage value of the blending of art with nature, including Celtic crosses, neoclassical monuments, obelisks, globes, and the cemetery's Gothic-Revival style lodge, all in a layout that was "park-like space for public use." The site's multitude of tree species, winding pathways, and prominent viewpoints of the Saint Lawrence River were noted, as well.

In 2011, the Mount Hermon Cemetery Association undertook restoration work to the outside of the cemetery's entrance lodge, which contains the Superintendent's office and residence. The work included the replacement of the lodge's asphalt shingle roof with a cedar shingle one and the addition of a wood staircase for a secondary entrance, as well as restorative measures performed on the cemetery's mass grave (French: charnier) for the anonymous victims from the Empress of Ireland.

On November 5, 2015, the remains of 204 unknown people, originally buried at the Saint Matthew's Church graveyard on Saint John Street in Québec City, were interred at Mount Hermon Cemetery. The skeletal remains were discovered by city archeologists while performing restoration work at the former location, during 1999–2000. The 204 individuals were buried at Saint Matthew's between 1772 and 1860.

A ceremony was held at Mount Hermon Cemetery on September 8, 2016, to mark the 150th anniversary of Jeffery Hale Hospital (French: Hôpital Jeffery Hale). At the ceremony, new engravings on the Hale family monument, along with a bench, were unveiled.

== War graves ==
The War Graves Photographic Project, a volunteer initiative which has recorded the graves or memorial listings of every Commonwealth service member death since World War I, has indexed the details regarding 170 servicemembers buried at Mount Hermon, including photographs of their headstones.

The Commonwealth War Graves Commission identified 68 individuals buried at Mount Hermon Cemetery whom it determined were casualties from World Wars I and II. Of those burials, 49 are of servicemembers whom were killed in active duty during the first World War; 14 from WWII, one of whom is an unidentified Canadian airman. In addition, there are three American war graves, as well as one interned Austrian civilian's grave. The Commonwealth burials located in Section G are buried in Plot 1368.

Section G, located in the northeastern portion of the cemetery is dedicated as "The Canadian Armed Forces Section and the Memorial to three United States Army Airmen who died in 1942" (French: section des Forces armées canadiennes et monument commémoratif de trois aviateurs américains décédes en 1942).

== Gallery ==
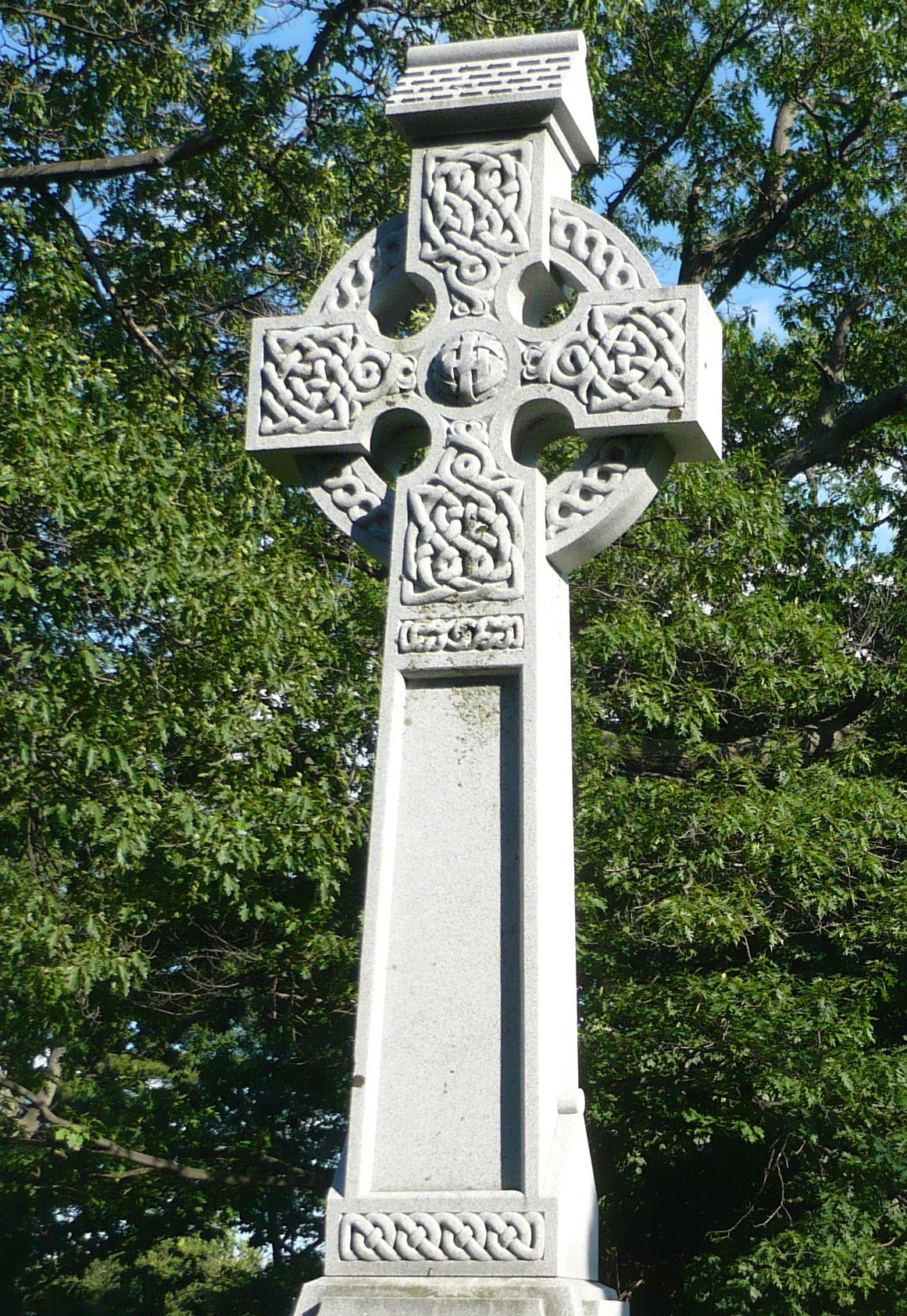
Forsyth family headstone

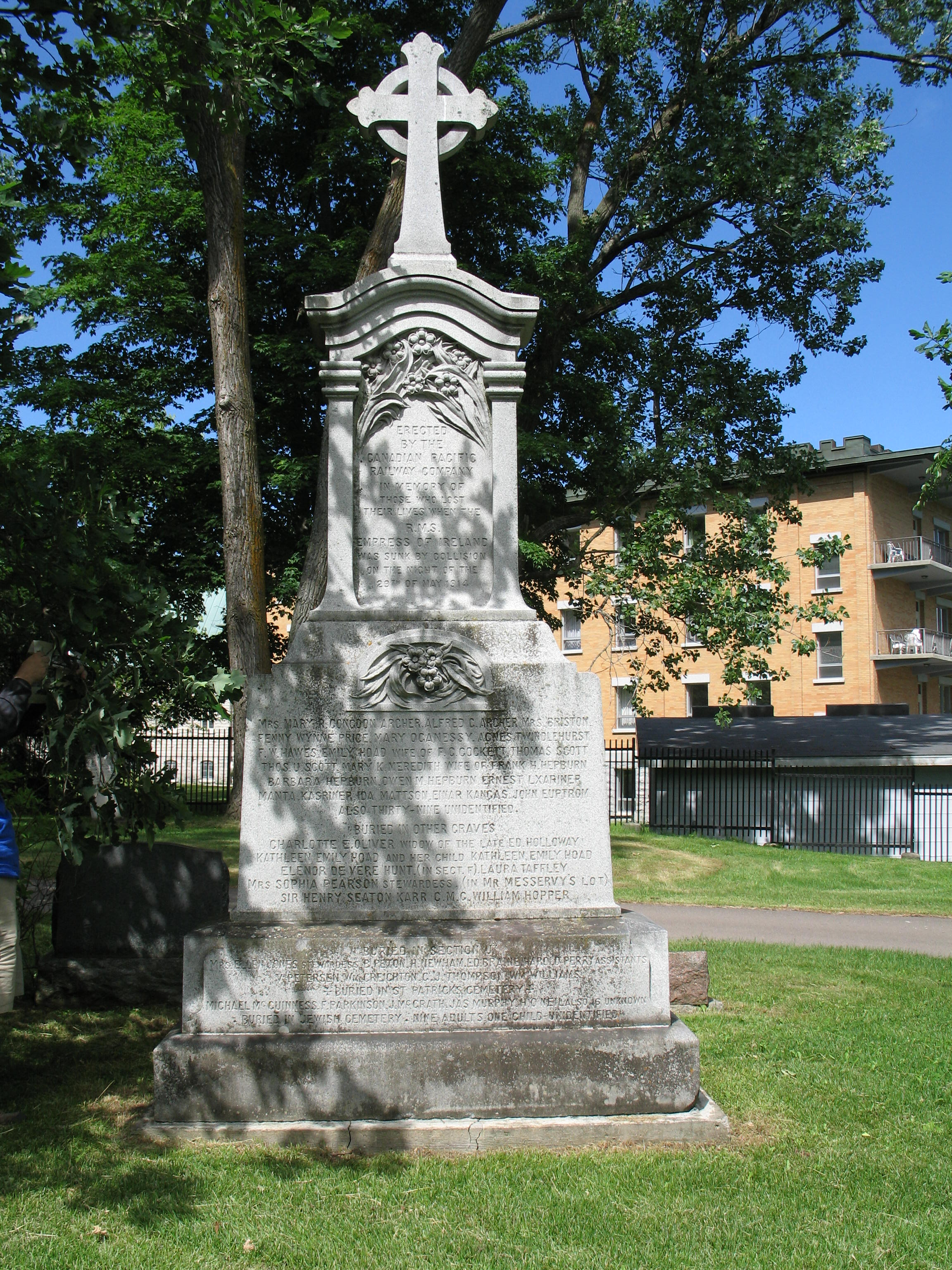
Empress of Ireland Memorial

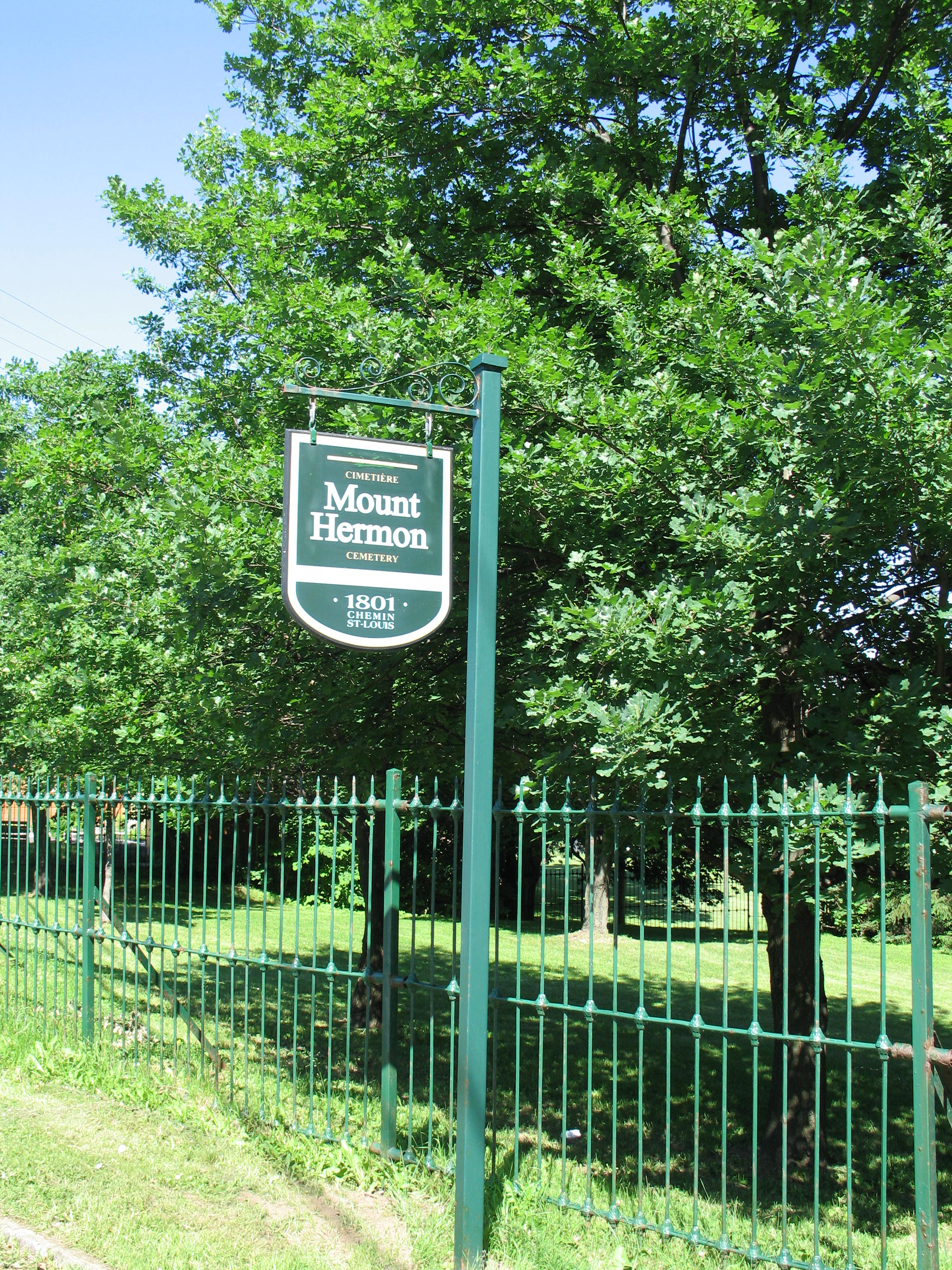
Street signage

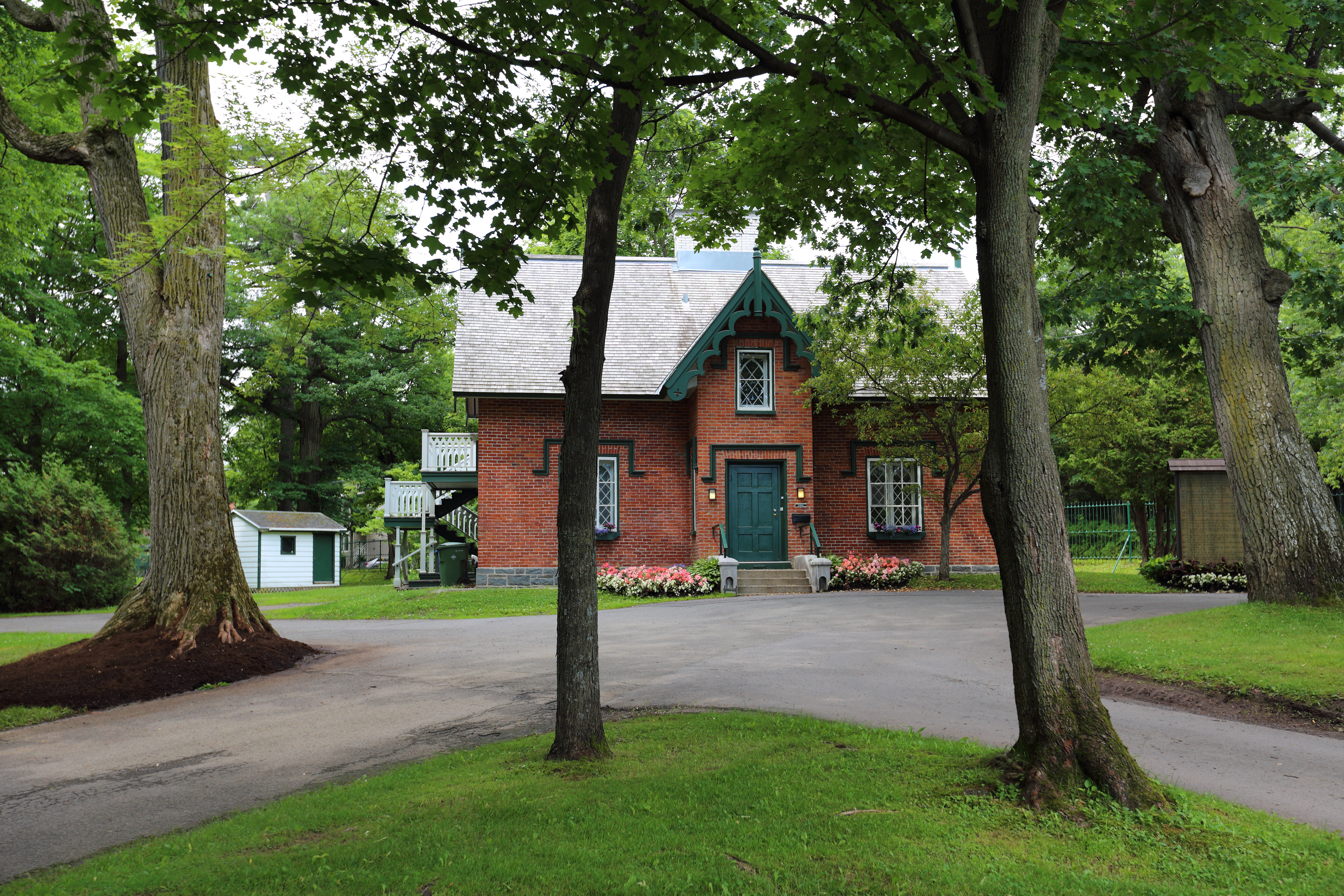
Entrance Lodge

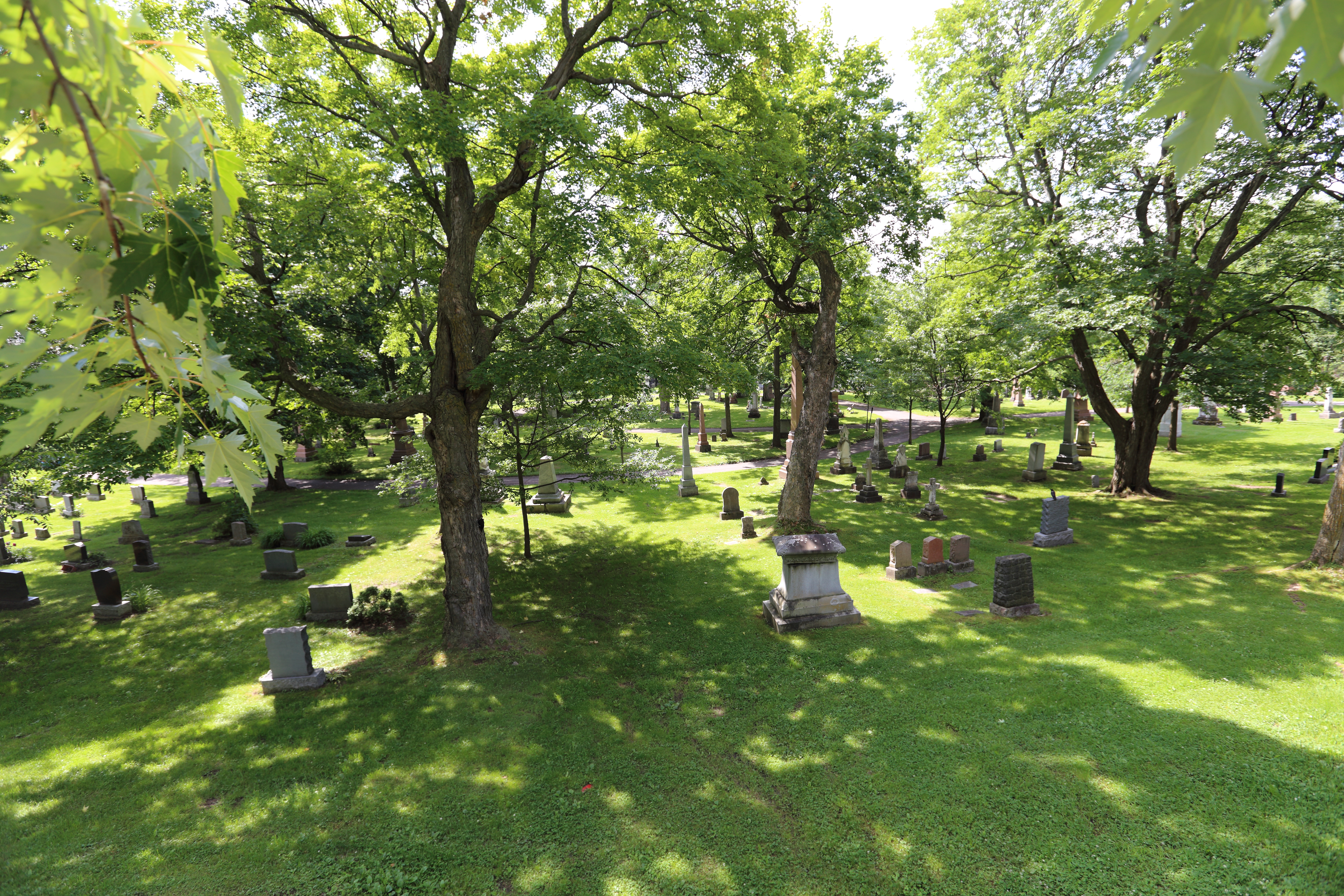
Garden landscape

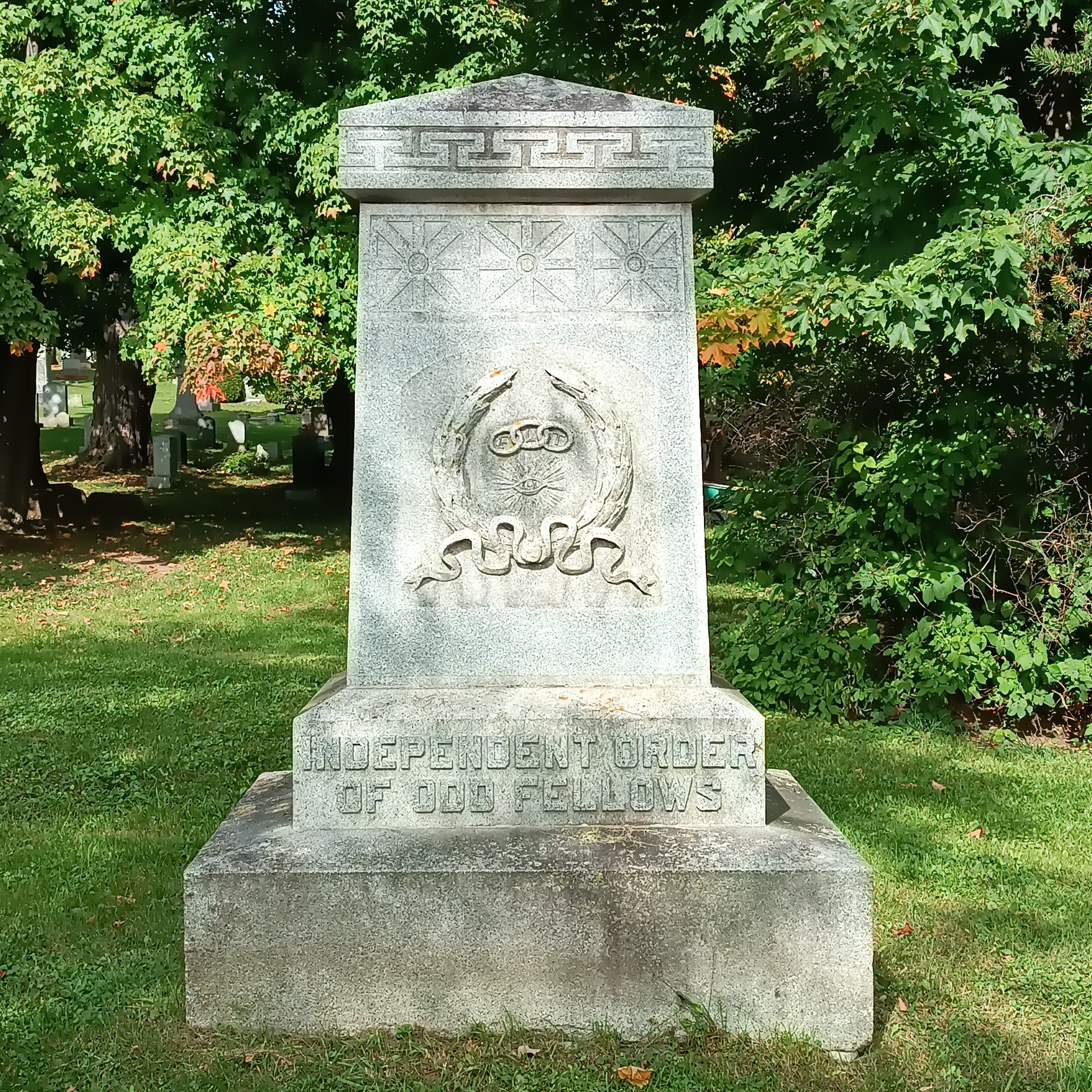
A monument in tribute to the Independent Order of Odd Fellows

== Notable burials ==
=== Business ===
- James Bell Forsyth (1802–1869) – prominent Quebec lumber merchant and author. He built the Cataraqui Estate in Sillery, on Saint-Louis Road, c. 1831. Served as a trustee of the Protestant Burial Ground committee (1857).
- George Benson Hall Jr. (1810–1876) – businessman involved in the Quebec lumber trade. Upon his death, the Quebec Morning Chronicle described him as "one of Quebec’s most prominent and enterprising citizens."
- John Henderson Holt (1850–1915) – co-founder of Holt, Renfrew & Co., Limited.
- William Henry Jeffrey (1811–1895) – financed and operated one of the first asbestos mines in Quebec.
- George Richard Renfrew (1831–1897) – in collaboration with John Henderson Holt, co-founded Holt, Renfrew & Co., Limited.
- John Hamilton Simons (1823–1906) – founder of La Maison Simons.

=== Education and religion ===
- Bishop George Jehoshaphat Mountain (1789–1863) – British-Canadian third Anglican Bishop of Quebec, the first principal of McGill College (1824–1835), and the founder of Bishop's University, located in the Lennoxville borough of Sherbrooke.
- The Reverend George Weir (1825–1891) – professor of Greek, Latin, Hebrew, and church history at Morrin College in Quebec City. Member and secretary of the Protestant section of the Council of Public Education of Quebec.

=== Government, politics, and law ===
- The Honourable Thomas Cushing Aylwin (1806-1871) – Quebec lawyer, judge and political figure.
- Henry Black, CB, Q.C., LL.D. (hon.c.) (1798–1873) – lawyer, political figure, and judge in the Province of Canada. He was the judge in the Court of Vice-Admiralty for the Quebec City district for thirty-seven years (1836-1873)
- The Hon. Edward Bowen KC (1780–1866) – 1st Chief Justice of the Superior Court for provincial Quebec, and the second Chancellor of Bishop's University. In 1830, Judge Bowen was the owner of the land which eighteen years later was transformed into Mount Hermon Cemetery, by David Bates Douglass.
- Frank Carrel (1870–1940) – journalist, publisher, and politician.
- Robert Christie (1787–1856) – lawyer, journalist, historian, and political figure in Lower Canada and Canada East.
- Joseph Bell Forsyth – the first mayor of Cap–Rouge, and a businessman. Son of James Bell Forsyth.
- Colonel Bartholomew Conrad Augustus Gugy – represented Sherbrooke in the Legislative Assembly of Lower Canada and the Legislative Assembly of the Province of Canada.
- Sir Henri-Gustave Joly de Lotbinière, KCMG, PC – served as the fourth Premier of the province of Quebec, a federal Cabinet minister, and the seventh Lieutenant Governor of British Columbia.
- John Lemesurier – politician who served as mayor of Quebec City, from January 1868 to November 1869. Buried next to his wife Mary Sylvain Lemesurier.
- The Hon. Sir William Collis Meredith, QC – the 2nd Chief Justice of the Superior Court of Quebec (province), from 1866 to 1884.
- John Munn – Scottish-born shipbuilder and political figure in Lower Canada.
- Seigneur George Pozer (Johann Georg Pfotzer) – merchant, landowner, and the fourth Seigneur of Aubert-Gallion. Considered to be the founder of Saint-Georges-de-Beauce.
- William Rhodes – soldier, farmer, and political figure in Quebec. He represented Mégantic in the Legislative Assembly of the Province of Canada.
- Dunbar Ross, QC (c. 1800–1865) – lawyer and political figure in Canada East.
- The Hon. James Gibb Ross – merchant and politician from the province of Quebec.
- Sir Henry Carba Seton-Karr CMG DL – English explorer, hunter, author, and a Conservative politician who sat in the House of Commons of the United Kingdom, 1885–1906. Perished on the Empress of Ireland.
- Silas Seymour – American civil engineer and politician from the state of New York.
- William Smith – lawyer, historian, speaker, loyalist, and eventually the loyalist Chief Justice of the Province of New York (1780–1782) and Chief Justice of the Province of Quebec, later Lower Canada, from 1786 until his death.
- Hazard Bailey Terrill – lawyer and political figure in Canada East.
- Richard Turner – merchant and legislator. Father of Lieutenant General Sir Richard Turner

=== Literature ===
- Sir James MacPherson Le Moine – author and barrister.
- William Charles Henry Wood – historian, Scout leader and naturalist.

=== Medicine ===
- Dr. Joseph Morrin – benefactor, physician, and twice mayor of Quebec City. The Morrin Centre bears his name.
- Dr. James Douglas (1880–1886) – in partnership with doctors Joseph Morrin and Charles-Jacques Frémont, purchased Robert Giffard de Moncel's manor-house at Beauport, and converted it into the Beauport Asylum (French: asile de Beauport) (later Robert-Giffard Hospital (French: centre hospitalier Robert-Giffard)). Aided in the foundation of the cemetery and a member of its first board of directors, in 1848.

=== Military ===
- Lieutenant Henry Edward Baines (1840–1866 †) – 26-year-old Royal Artillery officer who died from the injuries that he sustained while fighting the Great Fire of Quebec City, in 1866.
- Lieutenant General Sir Richard Turner – senior Canadian Army officer who served during the Second Boer War and the First World War, and was a recipient of the Victoria Cross.

== See also ==
- Sillery
- Sillery Heritage Site
- Green-Wood Cemetery
- David Bates Douglass
- RMS Empress of Ireland
