= Literary and Historical Society =

Literary and Historical Society may refer to:

- Literary and Historical Society (University College Dublin) a debating society at University College Dublin, Ireland
- Literary and Historical Society of Quebec, a learned society in Quebec, Canada
