= Joseph Morrin =

Canadian politician (1794–1861)

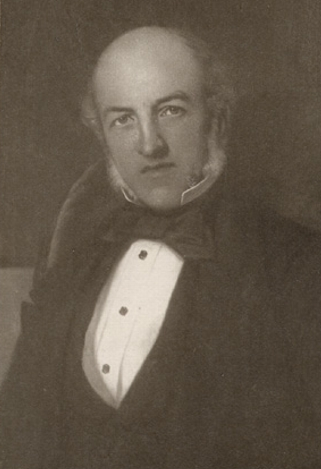
Joseph Morrin

Joseph Morrin (19 October 1794 – 24 August 1861) emigrated from Dumfriesshire, Scotland to Quebec City at the age of four. Since there were no medical schools in the city at the time, Morrin worked as a surgeon's apprentice. He returned to Scotland for a medical education at the University of Edinburgh. He came back to Quebec City upon graduating, where he began working as a doctor at the Hôtel-Dieu de Québec in 1826. In 1845, Morrin helped found the Beauport Asylum with two colleagues and subsequently continued his work as a doctor there. He also played a role in the founding of a major medical school in the city. Morrin served twice as mayor in the 1850s, and was the first democratically elected mayor of the city. At the age of 66 he retired due to poor health.

Upon retiring, Morrin bestowed money and property to three of his friends to found the institution that later became Morrin College. He also left behind an amount of money to Université Laval, the proceeds of which continue to be distributed to this day as financial aid for medical students.

He married Catherine Evans in Quebec City in 1817. Following her death, he married Maria Orkney in Quebec City in 1852. Morrin Was buried in Mount Hermon Cemetery in Sillery.

The Morrin Centre, located in the former Morrin College building, now bears his name.
