= 10th Hussars =

The 10th Hussars or 10th Hussar Regiment may refer to the following military units:

- 10th Royal Hussars, a former British Army cavalry regiment active 1801–1969
- 10th Queen's Own Canadian Hussars, a Canadian Army regiment active 1856-1913, 1928-1936
- 10th (Magdeburg) Hussars
