= Richard Turner (Canadian politician) =

Canadian politician

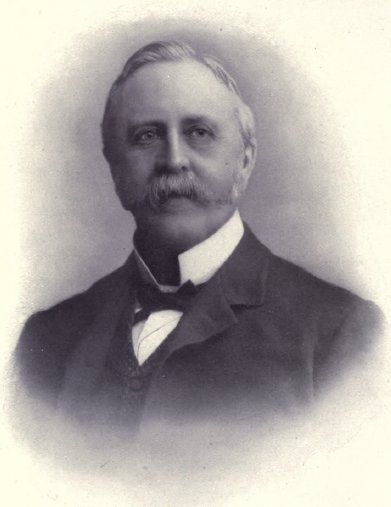

Member of the Legislative Council of Quebec for Golfe
- In office 1897–1917
- Preceded by: David Alexander Ross
- Succeeded by: Frank Carrel

Personal details
- Born: August 15, 1843 Quebec City, Lower Canada
- Died: December 22, 1917 (aged 74) Quebec City, Quebec, Canada
- Resting place: Mount Hermon Cemetery, Sillery, Quebec
- Party: Quebec Liberal Party
- Children: Lieutenant General Sir Richard Turner

Richard Turner (15 August 1843 – 22 December 1917) was a Canadian merchant and legislator.

Born in Quebec City, Quebec, the son of James Turner and Susans Frisell, Turner opened a wholesale grocery with a partner called Whitehead & Turner in 1870. In 1886, after Whitehead retired, Turner became the sole owner.

He was appointed to the Legislative Council of Quebec for the division of Golfe in 1897. A Liberal, he served until his death in 1917.

In 1867, he married Emily Maria Ellis. They had four sons and two daughters. One son, Lieutenant General Sir Richard Turner, was a Canadian general and recipient of the Victoria Cross.
