= Rural cemetery =

Type of cemetery

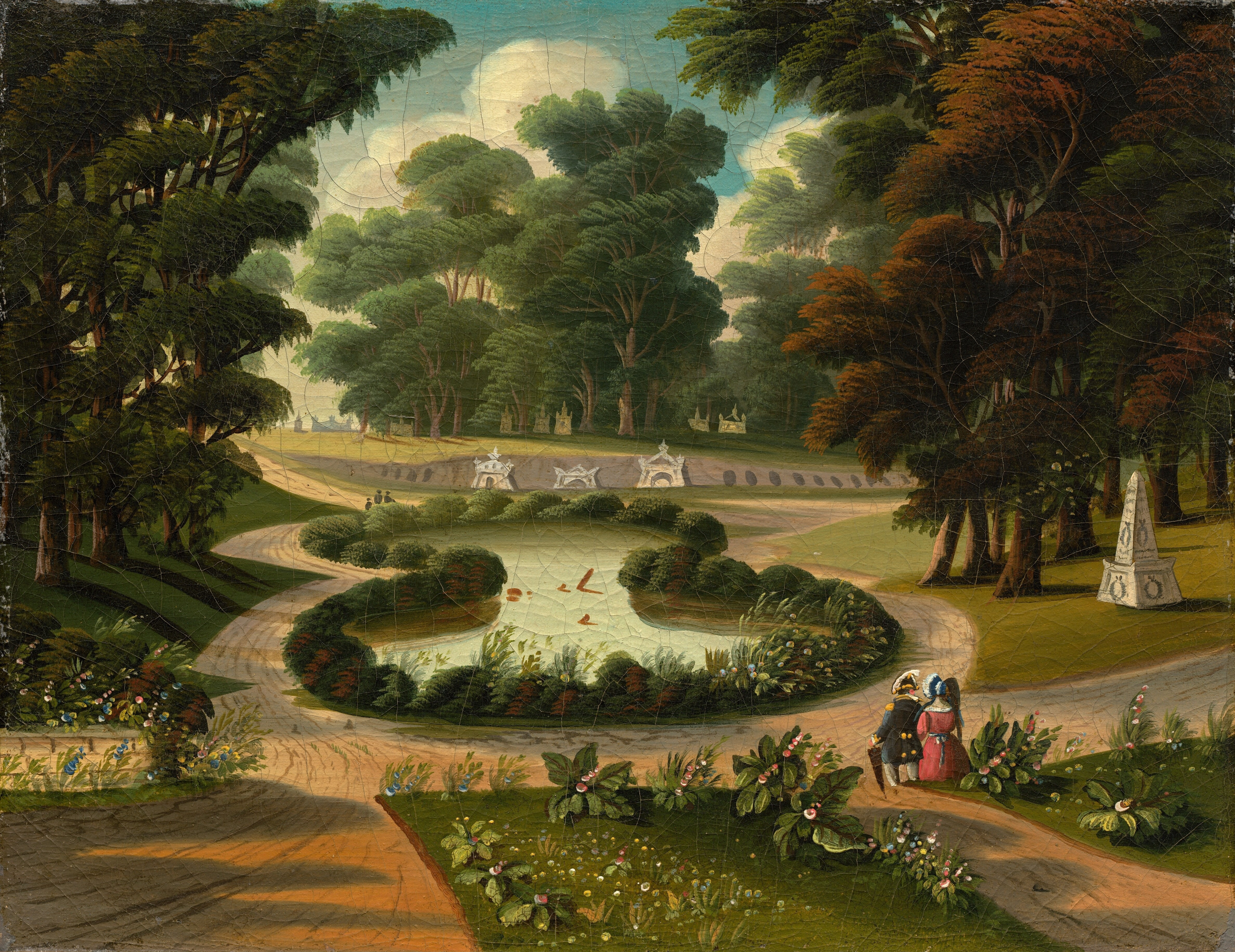
A 19th-century painting of Mount Auburn Park by Thomas Chambers

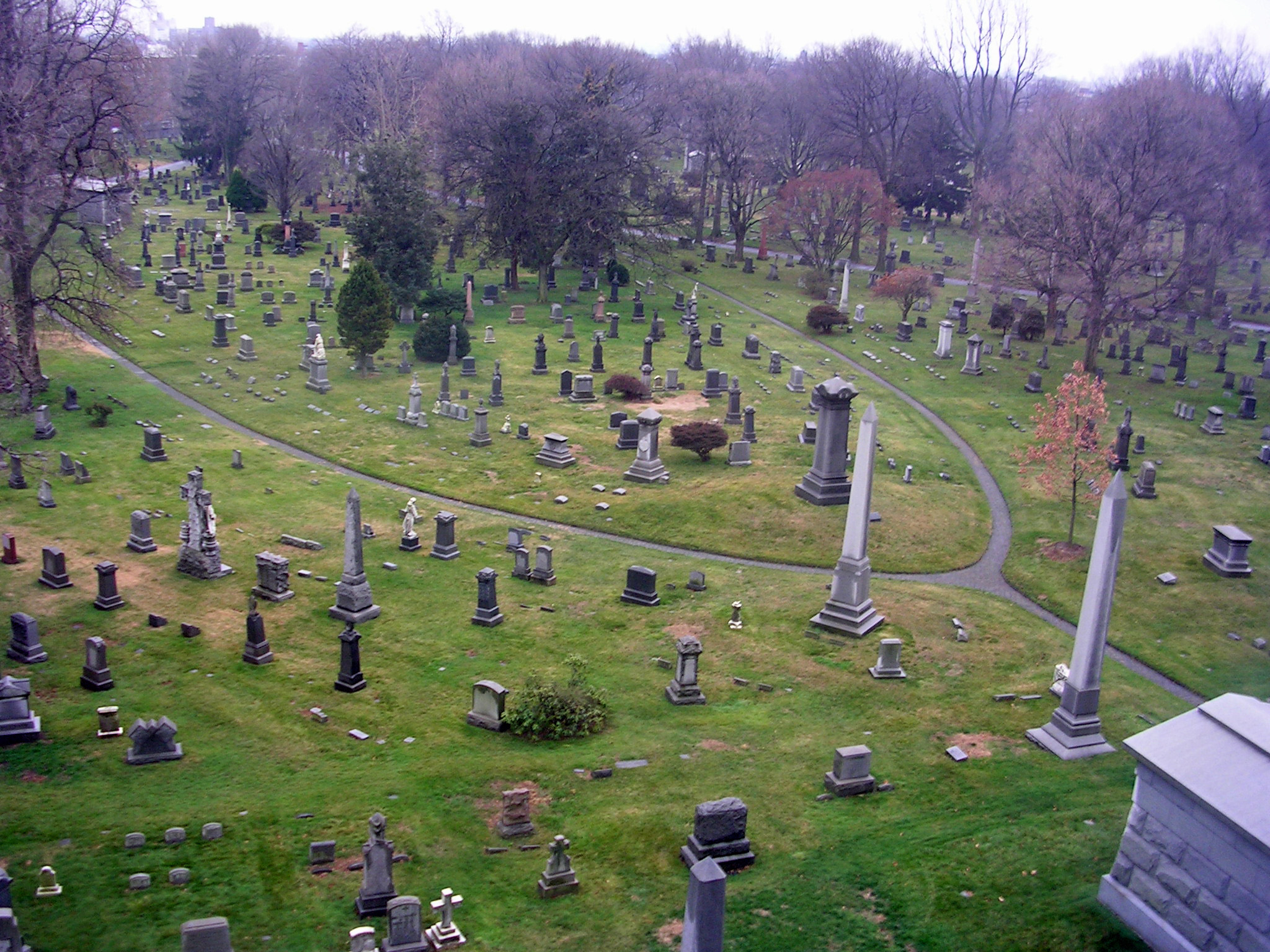
Landscaping and tree planting at Green-Wood Cemetery in the borough of Brooklyn in New York City

A rural cemetery or garden cemetery is a style of cemetery that was popular in the United States and Europe in the mid-19th century due to overcrowding in and health concerns about urban graveyards, which tended to be churchyards. Rural cemeteries were typically built 1–5 mi (1.6–8.0 km) outside of the city, far enough to be separated from the city, but close enough for visitors. They often contain elaborate monuments, memorials, columbariums and mausoleums in a landscaped park-like setting.

The rural cemetery movement mirrored changing attitudes toward death in the nineteenth century. Images of hope and immortality were popular in rural cemeteries in contrast to the puritanical pessimism depicted in earlier cemeteries. Statues and memorials included depictions of angels and cherubs as well as botanical motifs such as ivy representing memory, oak leaves for immortality, poppies for sleep and acorns for life.

From their inception, the new cemeteries were intended as civic institutions designed for public use. Before the widespread development of public parks, the rural cemetery provided a place for the general public to enjoy outdoor recreation amidst art and sculpture previously available only for the wealthy.

The popularity of rural cemeteries decreased toward the end of the 19th century due to the high cost of maintenance, development of true urban public parks and perceived disorderliness of appearance arising from independent ownership of family burial plots and different grave markers. Lawn cemeteries became instead an attractive design.

== History ==
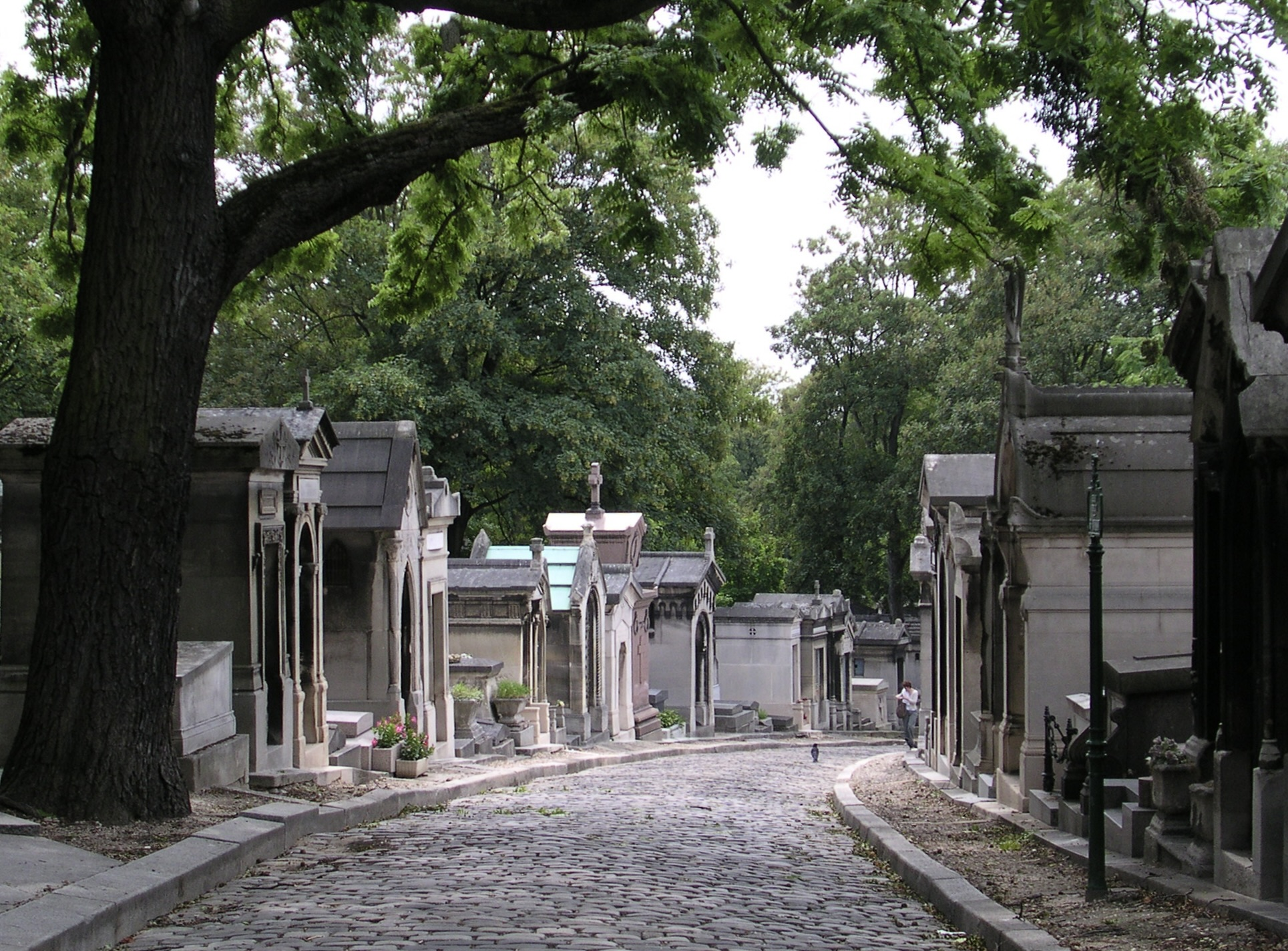
Pere Lachaise Cemetery in Paris

In the early 19th century, urban burial grounds were generally sectarian and located on small plots and churchyards within cities. With the rapid increase in urban populations due to the Industrial Revolution, urban cemeteries became unhealthily overcrowded with graves stacked upon each other, or emptied and reused for newer burials. The practice of embalming did not become popular until after the Civil War and cemeteries often had the stench of decomposing corpses. After several yellow fever epidemics, many cities began to relocate cemeteries outside city limits, as it was believed to be more hygienic.

As early as 1711, the architect Sir Christopher Wren advocated for the creation of burial grounds on the outskirts of town, "inclosed with a strong Brick Wall, and having a walk round, and two cross walks, decently planted with Yew-trees".

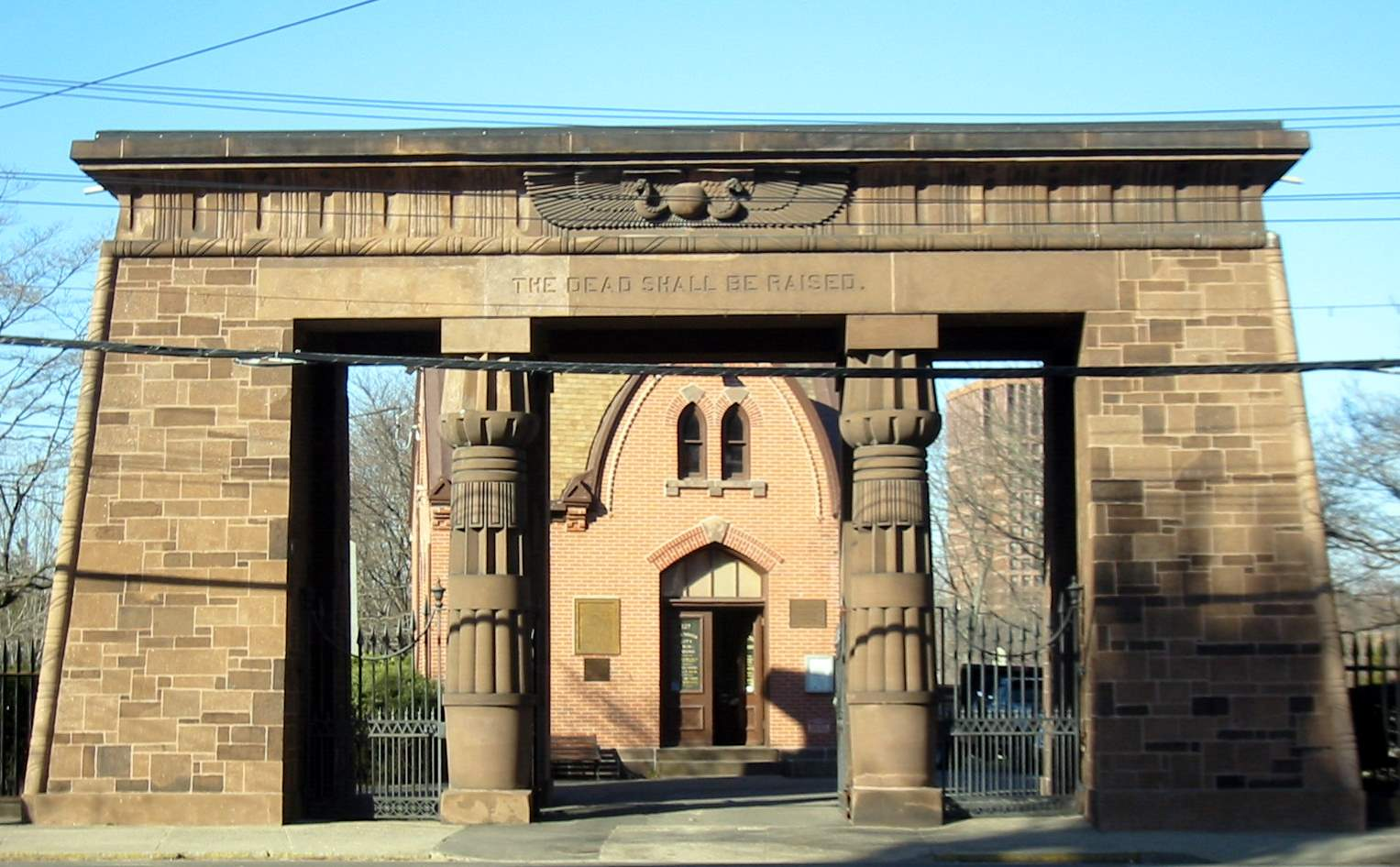
The Egyptian Revival entrance gate of Grove Street Cemetery in New Haven, Connecticut

An early influence on the rural cemetery movement was the New Burying Ground in New Haven, Connecticut – later renamed the Grove Street Cemetery – which was established in 1796, and was the first example in the U.S. of a non-sectarian cemetery outside of church and city control in a park-like setting.

In 1804, the first rural cemetery, the Père Lachaise Cemetery, opened in Paris. The new design took the cemetery out of the control of the church, using an attractive park built on a grand scale, architectural design and careful planting inspired by the English garden movement.

== United States ==
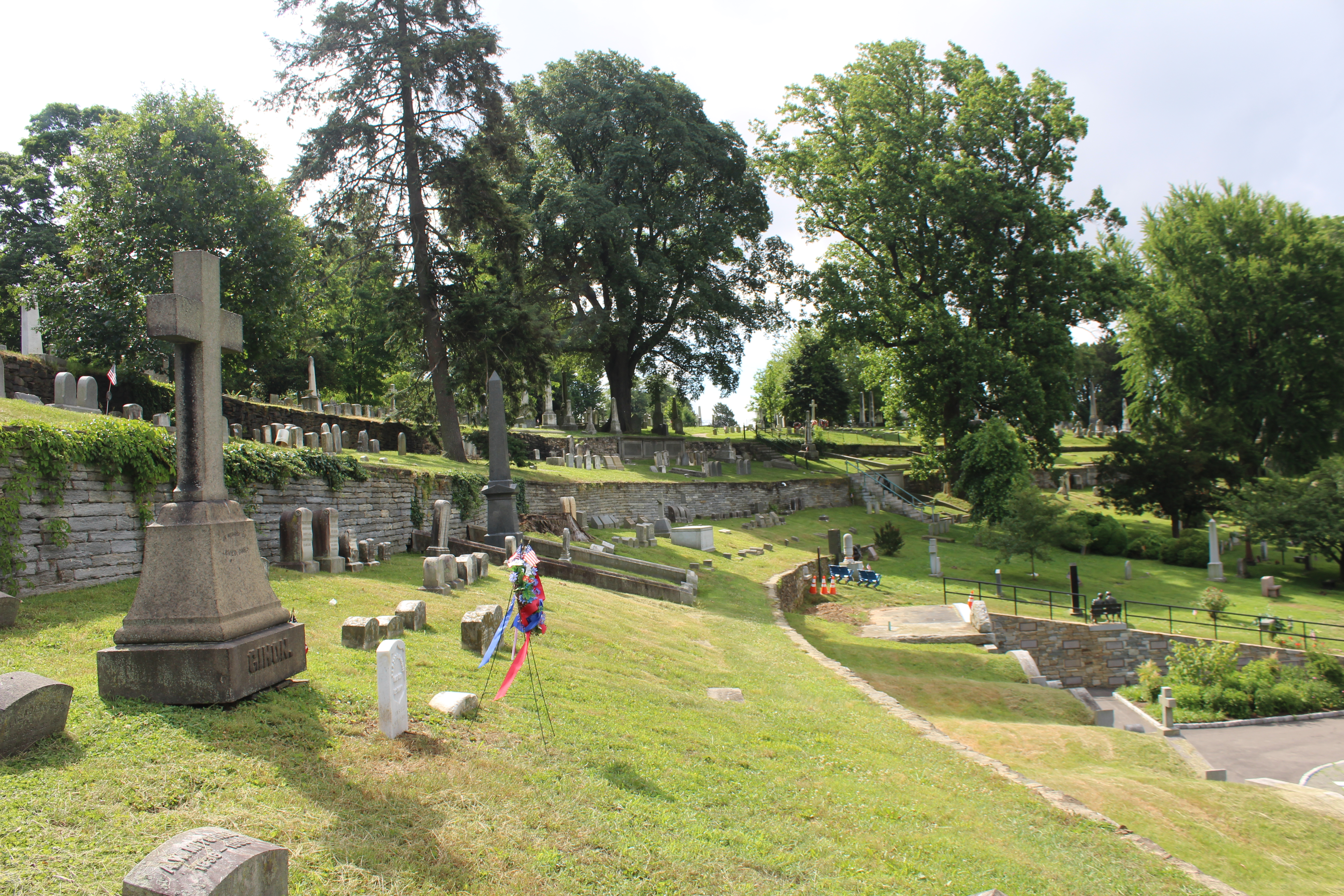
Laurel Hill Cemetery in Philadelphia was the second major rural cemetery built in the United States.

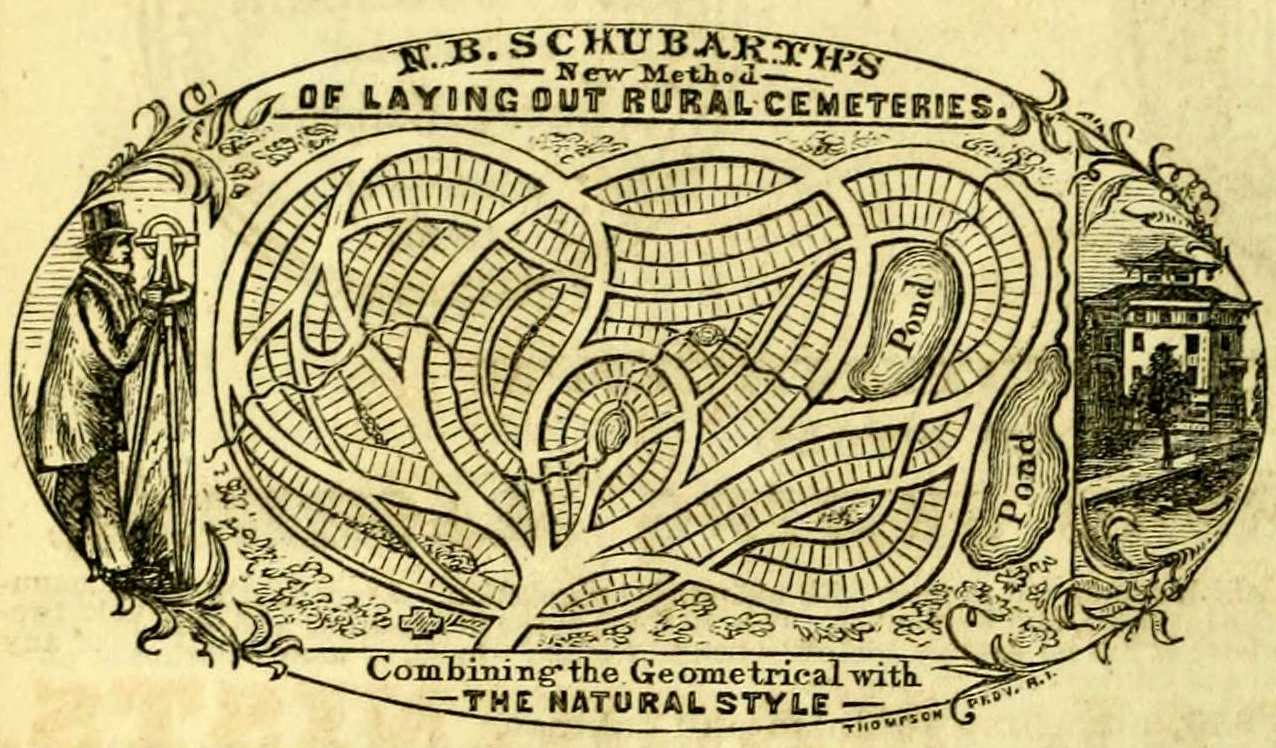
1861 engraving showing a plan for a rural cemetery by N. B. Schubarth of Rhode Island, United States

The first rural cemetery in the United States was Mount Auburn Cemetery in Cambridge, Massachusetts, founded by Dr. Jacob Bigelow and Henry Dearborn of the Massachusetts Horticultural Society in 1831. The city of Boston became concerned about the health hazards caused by decomposing corpses in cemeteries in the middle of the city. A citizens' group led by Bigelow pulled together residents to discuss the design and location of a cemetery outside city limits. The search for a site took six years and land was eventually purchased on a farm known as "Sweet Auburn" near the Charles River about four miles from Boston.

Coinciding with the growing popularity of horticulture and the Romantic aesthetic taste for pastoral beauty, Mount Auburn was developed as a "domesticated landscape" popularized by 19th-century English landscape design. Its plan included retention of natural features like ponds and mature forests with added roads and paths that followed the natural contours of the land, as well as the planting of hundreds of native and exotic trees and plants. United States Supreme Court Justice Joseph Story delivered the dedication address on September 24, 1831.

In his dedication address, Story described the cemetery as a spiritual landscape poised between heaven and earth, within which people could learn from the past by directly encountering the deeds of the great, thus connecting the present to the past in the face of dangerous change. Historian Leo Marx describes this as a "middle landscape", which historian Mark S. Schantz calls "a kind of pastoral ideal situated somewhere between the howling forces of raw nature and the corrupting taint of refined civilization". A visit to a rural cemetery, writes Schantz, was designed to be "mystical, emotional, and pleasurable", with the goal, in Story's words, to "cultivate feelings and sentiments more worthy of ourselves, and more worthy of Christianity". In this way rural cemeteries contributed to an ordered and well-regulated Christian republic of laws.

Mount Auburn quickly grew as a popular site for both burials and public recreation, attracting locals as well as tourists from across the country and Europe. It began the practice of allowing the purchase of family plots large enough to allow the burial of several generations of a single family.

Mount Auburn inspired dozens of other rural cemeteries across the U.S., such as Laurel Hill Cemetery in Philadelphia and Green-Wood Cemetery in Brooklyn. Many were accompanied by dedication addresses similar to Story's, which linked the cemeteries to the mission of creating a Christian republic.

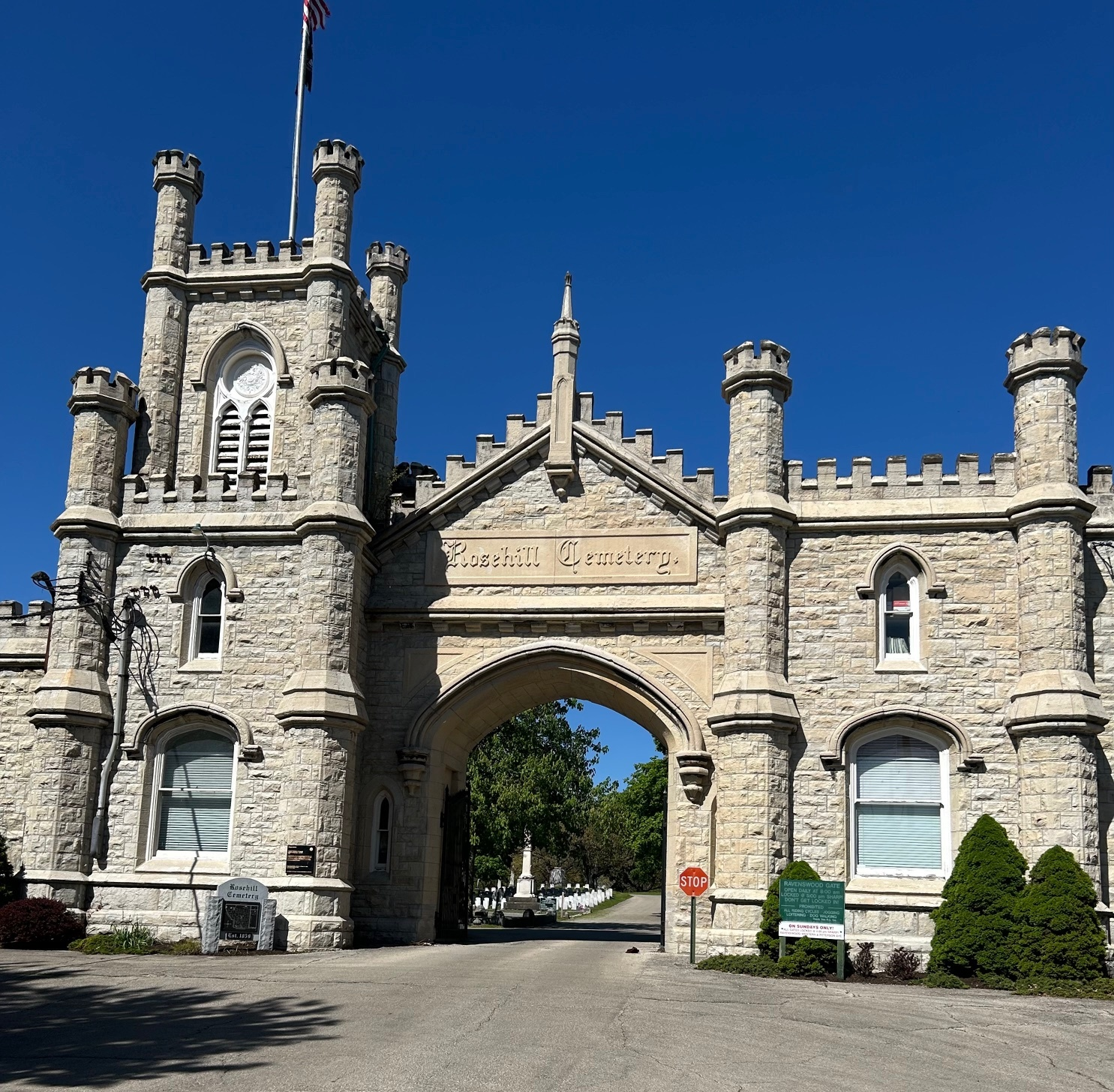
Entrance gate to Rosehill Cemetery, Chicago, Illinois

In 1847, the New York State Legislature passed the Rural Cemetery Act, which authorized commercial burial grounds in New York. The law led to the burial of human remains becoming a commercial business for the first time, replacing the practice of burying the dead in churchyards or on private farmland. One effect of the law was the development of a large concentration of cemeteries along the border between the New York City boroughs of Queens and Brooklyn, often called the "Cemetery Belt".

Unlike other reform movements of the time, such as abolitionism, women's suffrage, or the temperence movement, the rural cemeteries movement encountered very little organized opposition, nor was it confined to a single region. As a result, by the 1860s, rural cemeteries could be found on the outskirts of cities and smaller towns across the country. One contemporary observer noted that there was "hardly a city or town of any size in the union which does not possess its rural cemetery". These cemeteries were decorated with tall obelisks, spectacular mausoleums, and magnificent sculptures.

Other suburban American cemeteries which came about as part of the rural cemeteries movement included Mount Hope Cemetery (Bangor, Maine, 1834), the country's second oldest garden cemetery; Green Mount Cemetery (Baltimore, Maryland, 1839); Mount Hope Cemetery (Rochester, New York, 1838); Lowell Cemetery (Lowell, Massachusetts, 1841); Allegheny Cemetery (Pittsburgh, 1844); Albany Rural Cemetery (Menands, New York, 1844); Swan Point Cemetery (Providence, Rhode Island, 1846); Spring Grove Cemetery (Cincinnati, 1844); Forest Hills Cemetery (Jamaica Plain, 1848); Sleepy Hollow Cemetery (Sleepy Hollow, New York, 1849); and Oakwood Cemetery (Syracuse, New York, 1859), plus others in Cave Hill, Kentucky; Savannah, Georgia; and Little Rock, Arkansas.

By 1861, the rural cemetery movement began to decline, partly due to the high cost of maintaining large landscapes, but also due to the development of public urban parks. Many landscape designers, including Frederick Law Olmsted, who co-designed Central Park in New York City with Calvert Vaugh and went on to design other well known urban parks, borrowed ideas from rural cemeteries. As more public parks opened, fewer people went to cemeteries for leisure and relaxation activities.

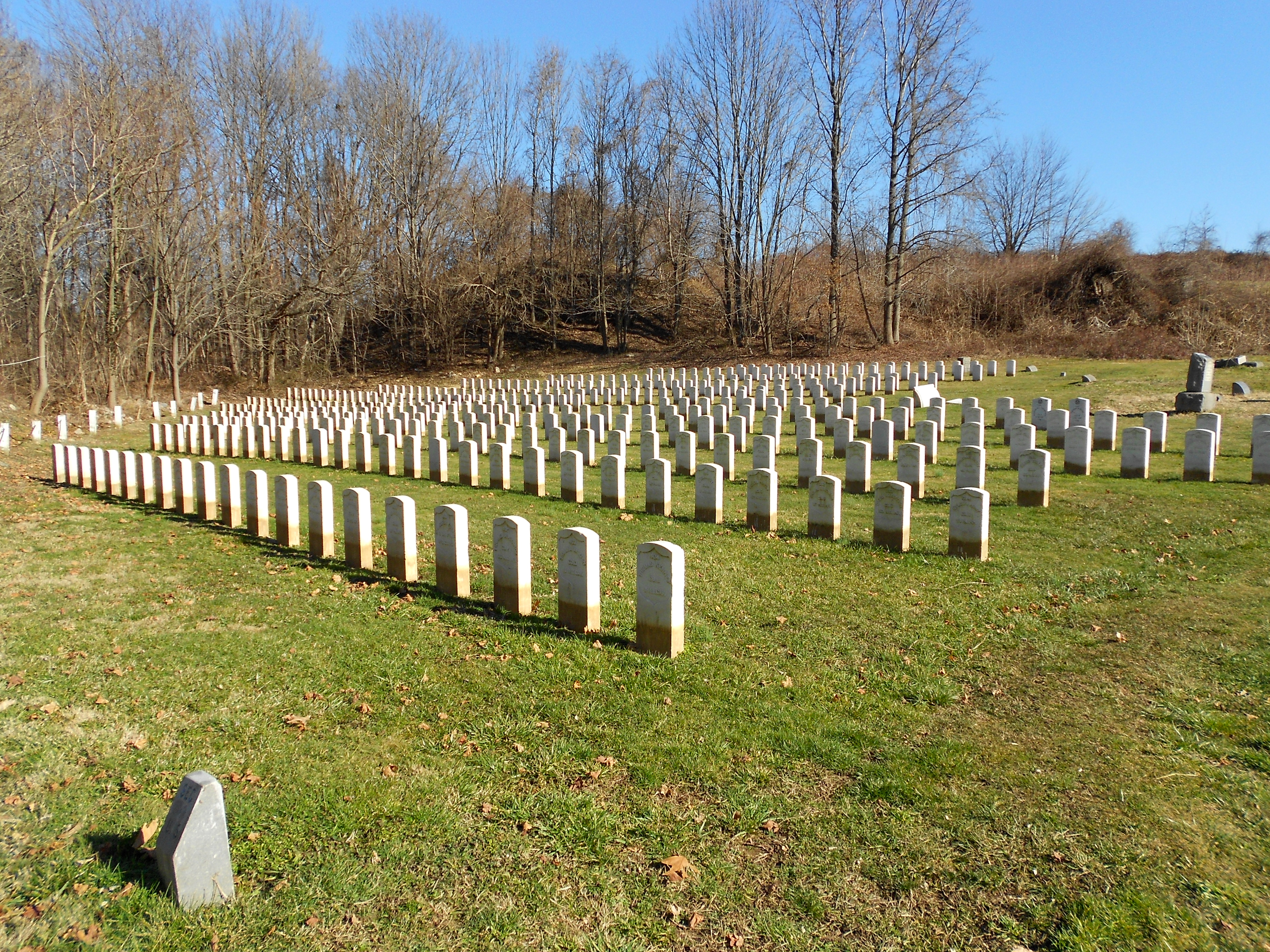
The Soldiers' Lot in Mount Moriah Cemetery was purchased by the U.S. federal government in 1864 for the burial of soldiers in the American Civil War who died at local hospitals.

Due to the scale of death caused by the American Civil War (almost 2% the U.S. population died in the war), the U.S. government outsourced many burials to privately owned rural cemeteries.

Since family plot owners could do as they wished with their lots, rural cemeteries that began as orderly and scenic ended up as cluttered and unkempt. Rural cemeteries began to fade out of popularity and were replaced by the lawn cemetery.

Presently, many of these historic cemeteries are designated landmarks and are cared for by non-profit organizations.

== Canada ==
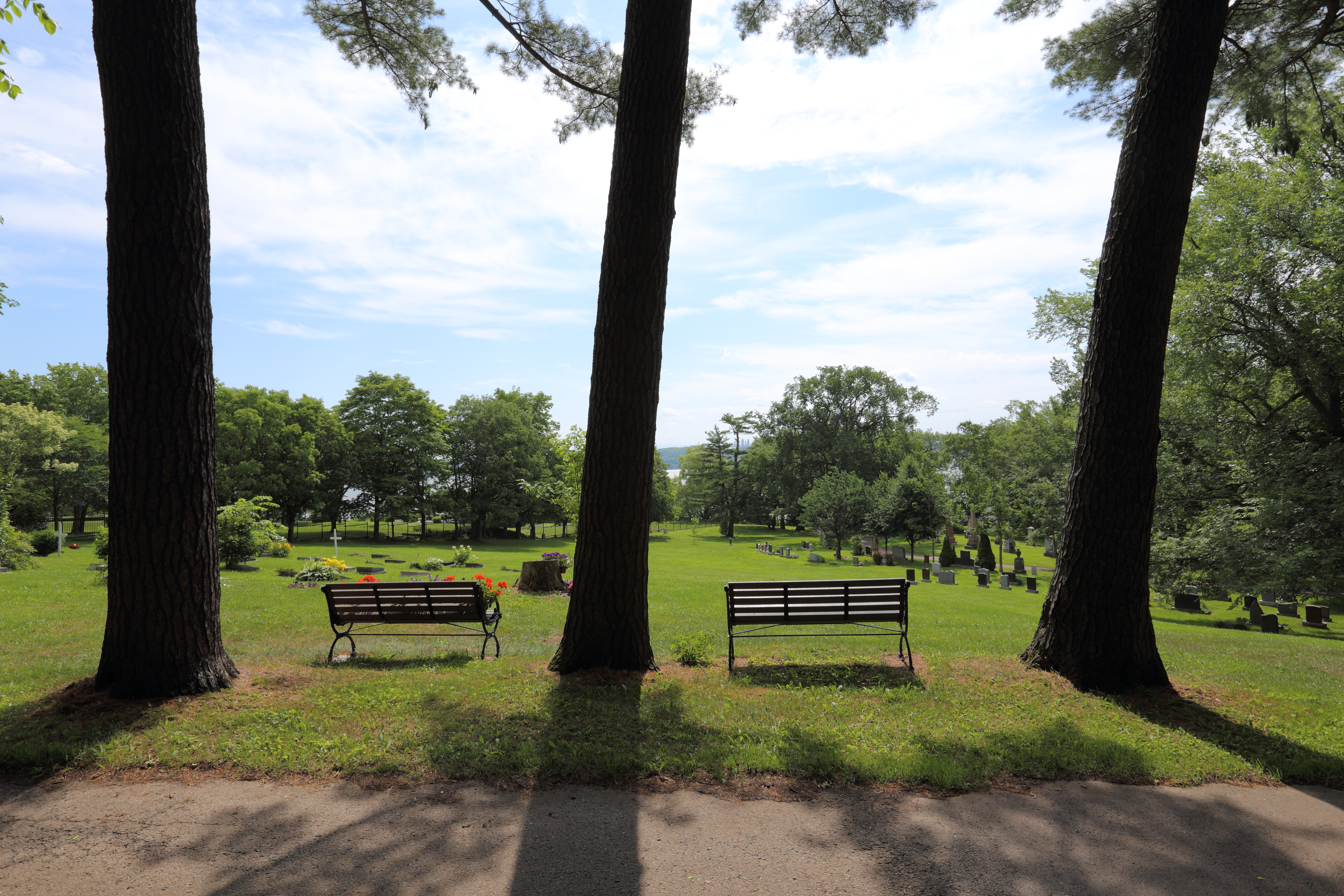
Mount Hermon Cemetery: "Park-like space for public use"

- Mount Hermon Cemetery in Sillery, Québec City (1848)

David Bates Douglass, a military and civilian engineer, working in the capacity as a consulting architect, designed the landscape layout of Albany Rural Cemetery, 1845–1846. He modeled his design of the Albany Rural Cemetery, as well as his subsequent and final one, Mount Hermon Cemetery (1848), in a rural area outside of Quebec City, Canada, upon his first design, the highly acclaimed Green-Wood Cemetery, in what at the time was a rural section of Brooklyn. All three of Douglass' rural, garden cemeteries have been conferred a historic status, by their respective nations.

- Cimetière Notre-Dame-des-Neiges in Montreal (1852);
- Cimetière Notre-Dame-de-Belmont in Sainte-Foy, Québec City (1857–1859)

Its architect, Charles Baillargé, took inspiration from Green–Wood Cemetery, as well, for his design of this garden cemetery, in what at the time was the rural outskirts of the city of Québec.

== United Kingdom ==
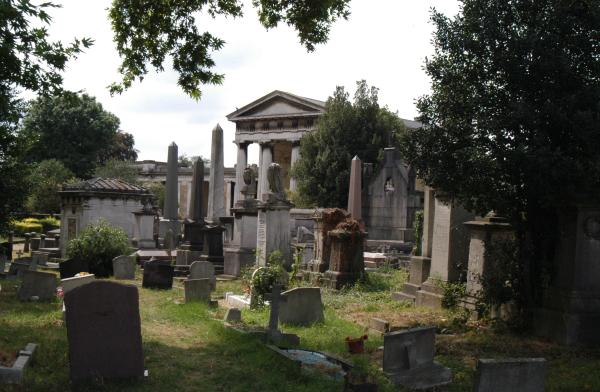
Monuments and chapel at Kensal Green Cemetery

The development of the American movement paralleled the creation of the landscaped cemeteries in the United Kingdom, with Mount Auburn inspiring the design of one of London's first non-denominational cemetery at Abney Park (1840), one of the Magnificent Seven cemeteries.

- Glasgow Necropolis in Glasgow (1832)
- Kensal Green Cemetery in London (1833)
- Sheffield General Cemetery in Sheffield (1836)
- Manchester General Cemetery in Manchester (1837)
- West Norwood Cemetery in London (1837)
- Highgate Cemetery in London (1839)
- Abney Park Cemetery in London (1840)
- Brompton Cemetery in London (1840)
- Nunhead Cemetery in London (1840)
- Tower Hamlets Cemetery Park in London (1841)
- Warriston Cemetery in Edinburgh (1843)
- Paisley Woodside Cemetery near Glasgow (1845)
- Dalry Cemetery in Edinburgh (1846)
- Cathcart Cemetery near Glasgow (1878)
- North Merchiston Cemetery in Edinburgh (1881)

== Germany ==
Among the first of the Parkfriedhof established in German-speaking Europe, the South Cemetery (Südfriedhof) in Kiel dates from 1869, the Riensberger Friedhof in Bremen dates from 1875, the 1881 Zentralfriedhof Friedrichsfelde in Berlin, the 1881 Südfriedhof in Leipzig, and the Ohlsdorf Cemetery in Hamburg. The Ohlsdorf was transformed from a treeless, sandy plain into 92 acres of sculpted, wooded landscape by its first director, architect Wilhelm Cordes. In 2016 it stands as the largest rural cemetery in the world, and has been the largest cemetery in Europe since its opening in 1875.

As of 1911, rural cemeteries were still unusual in Germany. Other examples include the Waldfriedhof Dahlem in Berlin, 1931 and the Parkfriedhof Werl, 1850.

== See also ==
- Rural Cemetery Act
