= Literary and Historical Society of Quebec =

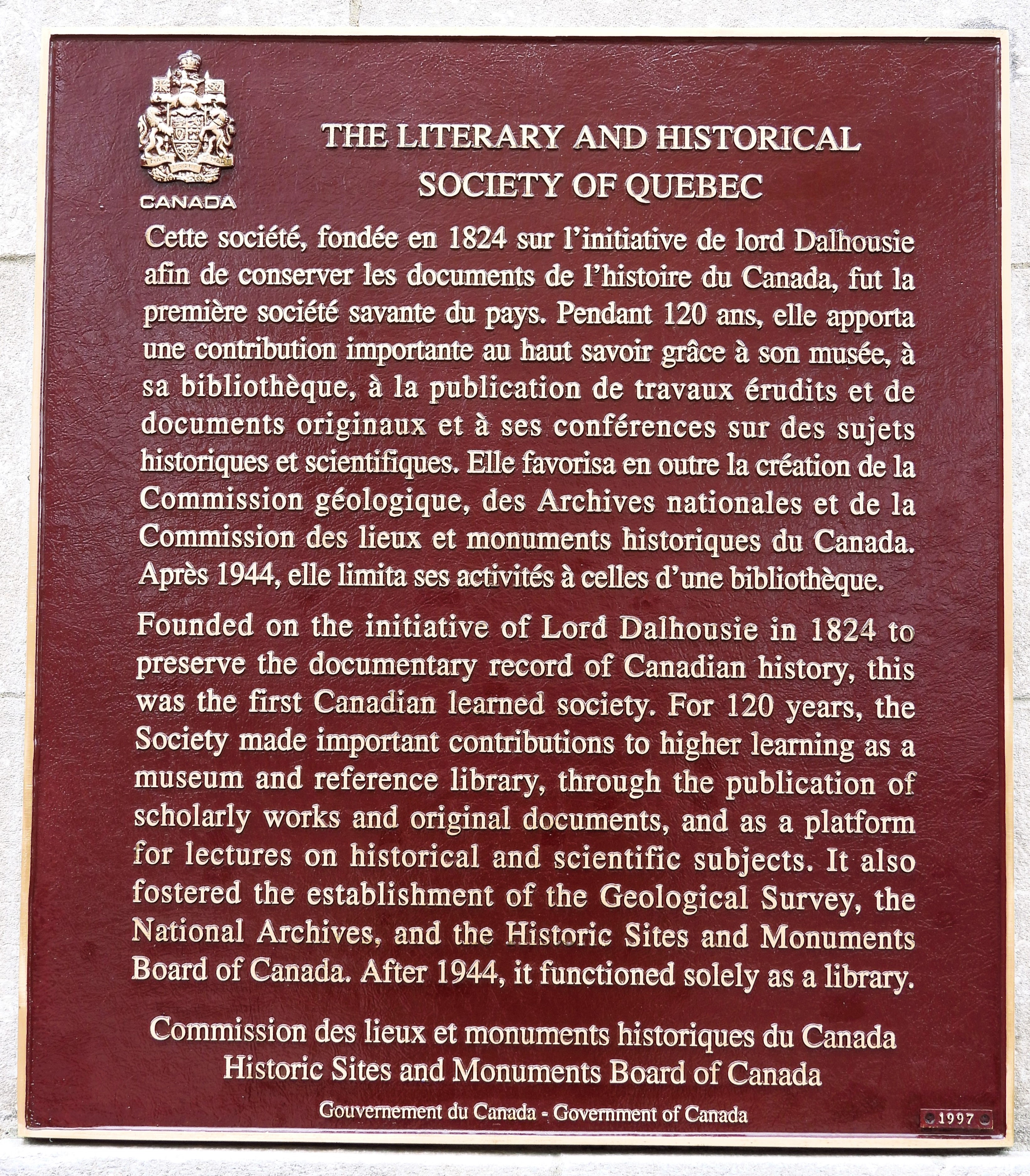
- Plaque at Morrin Centre
- Formation: January 6, 1824; 202 years ago
- Type: Learned society

The Literary and Historical Society of Quebec (LHSQ) was the first English-speaking historical society, and one of the first learned societies, in Canada. It was founded in 1824 by George Ramsay, Earl of Dalhousie, governor of British North America. Its headquarters are still located in Quebec City.

After several moves and two fires, the Society settled into the northern wing of Quebec City's Morrin College in 1868. The college closed at the turn of the 20th century but the Society stayed on, eventually taking over the entire building in 2004.

The Society's original aims were encyclopaedic, being founded in the infancy of Canada's cultural and intellectual development. The Society gathered historical documents about Canada and republished many rare manuscripts. Research in all fields of knowledge was actively encouraged. Talks were held in the Society's reading room, the best of which were published regularly in a quasi-annual series of Transactions from 1824 to 1924.

Over the years, the Society played a part in creating public institutions that would take over many of its traditional roles. For instance, it fostered the foundation of the Public Archives of Canada (today's Library and Archives Canada) in 1872. It was also active in the preservation of Canada's built and natural heritage, helping to save the Plains of Abraham from developers and eventually fostering the creation of the Historic Sites and Monuments board of Canada.

With the growth of national public institutions, the Society's activities gradually became centred on the services of its private lending library, providing access to English-language books in a largely French-speaking city.

In the 1990s, the Society reassessed its mission and sought to expand its cultural services to Quebec City's small English-speaking community. In 2000, it took on the Morrin Centre project, which restored the 200-year-old historic site it is housed in to create an English-language cultural centre in Quebec City.

== Presidents of the LHSQ ==
- Sir Francis Nathaniel Burton, Lt. Governor (1824)
- Hon. James Reid, Chief Justice (1828)
- Lieutenant Frederick Henry Baddeley, R.N. (1829)
- Hon Jonathan Sewell, Chief Justice (1830–1831)
- Hon. Andrew Stuart, K.C. (1832) (1837–1838)
- Hon. William Sheppard (1833–1834, 1841, 1843, 1847)
- Joseph Skey, M.D. (1835)
- Rev. Daniel Wilkie, L.L.D. (1836)
- William Kelly, M.D., R.N. (1839–1840)
- Hon. A.W. Cochrane (1842) (1845) (1848)
- George-Barthélemy Faribault, Esq. (1844, 1849–1854, 1858–1859)
- John Charlton Fisher, Esq., L.L.D. (1846)
- Edmund Allen Meredith, Esq., M.A. (1855, 1860–1861)
- W. Andrew, Esq., M.A. (1856–1857)
- John Langton, Esq., M.A. (1862–1865)
- Com. Edward David Ashe, R.N., F.R.A.S. (1862–1865, 1873)
- Hon. Pierre-Joseph-Olivier Chauveau, L.L.D. (1868)
- James Douglas (1869, 1874–1875)
- Dr. W.J. Anderson (1870, 1872)
- The Hon. Sir James MacPherson LeMoine, Esq. (1871, 1879–1882, 1902–1903)
- James Stevenson, Esq. (1876–1878)
- Hon. David Alexander Ross, Q.C. (1883–1884)
- George Stewart, D.C.L., F.R.S.C., F.R.G.S. (1885–1891)
- Cyrille Tessier, Esq. (1892–1893)
- Archibald Campbell, Esq. (1894–1895)
- Rev. R.W. Norman, D.D., Dean of Quebec (1896–1897)
- Philippe Baby Casgrain, Esq. (1898–1899, 1906–1907)
- William Wood, Esq., D.C.L., F.R.S.C. (1900–1901, 1904–1905, 1938–1941)
- Dr. G.W. Parmelee, L.L.D. (1908–1909, 1917–1918)
- John Hamilton, M.A., D.C.L. (1910–1911)
- Col. H. Neilson (1912–1913)
- Judge John Charles McCorkill (1914)
- Dr. J.M. Harper, M.A., F.E.I.S (1915–1916)
- E.T.D. Chambers, Esq. (1919–1920)
- Lt-Col. the Rev. Peter Michael O'Leary (1921)
- Dominick Daly O'Meara, Esq. (1922–1923)
- J.C. Sutherland, Esq. (1924–1925)
- Hon. G.F. Gibsone (1926–1927, 1942–1943)
- Major W.H. Petry (1928–1929)
- Rev. A.T. Love (deceased April 1930)
- Hon. Frank Carrel, M.L.C. (1930–1934)
- Col. Count de Bury, C.B.E., R.C.O.C. (1934–1935)
- Thomas R. Peacock, R.R.I., B.A. (1936–1937)
- E.C. Woodley, Esq. (1944–1946)
- W.Godfrey Brown, Esq. (1947–1948)
- George A. Clare, Esq. (1949–1952, 1957–1960, 1970–1976)
- William MacMillan (1953–1956)
- John H.C. McGreevy, O.C. (1961–1965)
- Jean H. Bieler (1966–1969)
- Rosemary Cannon (1977–1980, 1985–1989)
- Cameron MacMillan (1981–1984, 1990–1992)
- Dr. Tomas Feininger (1993–1998)
- David F. Blair (1999–2012)
- Sovita Chander (2012–2016)
- Barry Holleman (2016–2020)
- Gina Farnell (2020–2024)
- Neil Williams (2024-current)

== Transactions of the Literary and Historical Society of Quebec ==
- Transactions of the Literary and Historical Society of Quebec Vol. 1
- Vol. 2
- Vol. 3
- Vol. 4
- Vol. 5
- Parts 8-12
- Part 13
- No. 28
- No. 25 - 30
