= David Bates Douglass =

American engineer (1790–1849)

David Bates Douglass LL.D.
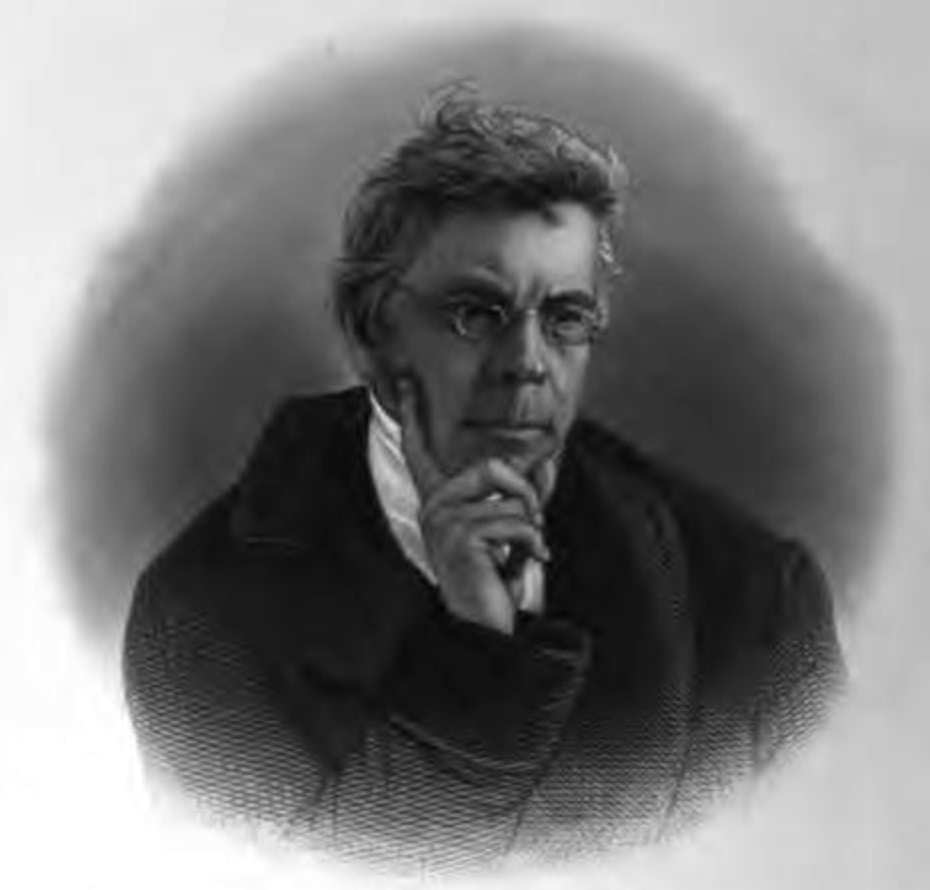
- Born: March 21, 1790; Pompton Township, New Jersey, U.S.
- Died: October 21, 1849 (aged 59); Geneva, New York, U.S.
- Occupation: Professor of Civil Engineering
- Known for: Professor at USMA, designed Green-Wood Cemetery

Signature
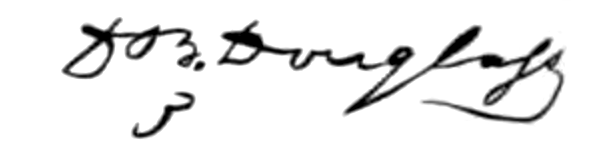

David Bates Douglass (March 21, 1790 – October 21, 1849) was a civil and military engineer, who worked on a broad set of projects throughout his career. For fifteen years he was a professor at the United States Military Academy, and after his resignation from the army he worked as a consulting engineer while holding academic appointments at various colleges and universities. He was the third president of Kenyon College (1841–1845), and when he died in 1849 he was the chair of the Mathematics Department at Hobart College.

== Early life and War of 1812 ==
Douglass was born to Nathaniel and Sarah Douglass in Pompton Township, New Jersey, an iron mining region. His mother's brother was the notable civil engineer, David Stanhope Bates. Although his early education was ordinary, being primarily taught by his mother, he developed a passion for technology under the influence of observation of the local industry. He graduated from Yale College in 1813. Shortly after graduation, he entered service in the War of 1812 and received a commission as Second Lieutenant in command of a corps of miners and sappers. He distinguished himself in the war, participating in the Battle of Lundy's Lane, and receiving a citation and field promotion to First Lieutenant for gallantry at the Siege of Fort Erie.

== West Point years ==
From 1815 until 1831, Douglass was a professor at the United States Military Academy at West Point. During this time, he also worked on a variety of other government-sponsored as well as private projects. He consulted on the western section of the Erie Canal, at the request of Governor DeWitt Clinton.

In 1815, he married Ann Ellicott, the daughter of Andrew Ellicott, Professor of Mathematics at the academy.

=== Lewis Cass expedition of 1820 ===
In 1820, he was a member of the Lewis Cass expedition to explore the south shore of Lake Superior. His orders read:

You are assigned to accompany a party to be employed in exploring the Southern Coasts and Shores of Lake Superior in the course of the ensuing summer under the direction of Governor Cass of Michigan Territory.... You will join him at Detroit by the first of May at the farthest and when your services will be no longer required by him you will return to West Point, N.Y. and report by letter thence to this Department.

Other members of the expedition included Henry Rowe Schoolcraft, Charles C. Trowbridge and James Duane Doty. By most accounts, the expedition successfully completed and even exceeded its mission, particularly in regard to unexpected ethnological observations. Cass had also previously stated that an objective was to ascertain the feasibility of relocating the Iroquois Confederacy from New York, and many Oneida, Brothertown and Stockbridge Indians were removed from New York to Wisconsin (then Michigan Territory) in the succeeding years.

Douglass was charged by Cass to lead the project to write, under joint authorship, the official account of the expedition. However, the death of his father-in-law and obligations to his new position as Chair of the Department of Mathematics (including teaching himself French in order to read the most current texts available on calculus) led to personal delays, and in what was an acrimonious split from his colleague, Schoolcraft scooped him and published his own account.

== Post-military career ==
=== Morris Canal ===
In 1831, Douglass submitted his resignation to the academy and it was accepted, as his outside projects were becoming more of a distraction. First and foremost was as a consulting engineer for the Morris Canal, in particular as the designer of the Montville inclined plane. As the Newark Eagle reported, the 1830 test of the device was a major success:

The machinery was set in motion under the direction of Major Douglass, the enterprising Engineer. The boat, with two hundred persons on board, rose majestically out of the water; in one minute it was upon the summit, which it passed apparently with all the ease that a ship would cross a wave of the sea. As the forward wheels of the car commenced their descent, the boat seemed gently to bow to the spectators and the town below, then glided quickly down the wooden way. In six minutes and thirty seconds it descended from the summit and re-entered the canal, thus passing a plane one thousand and forty feet long, with a descent of seventy feet, in six and one half minutes.

These inclined planes became an internationally renowned tourist attraction. The Elbląg Canal, one of Seven Wonders of Poland, used the Morris Canal's technology as inspiration for its inclined planes; for that reason, the inclined planes on that canal strongly resemble those on the Morris canal.

=== Green-Wood Cemetery ===
One of the Douglass's most significant lasting legacies is Green-Wood Cemetery in New York. It established a style of peaceful, natural setting known as a rural cemetery that was copied several times by Douglass himself as well as his admirers.

=== President of Kenyon College ===
Douglass was the third president of Kenyon College, serving from 1841 to 1845. He wrote two monographs concerning the reasons for his departure.

=== Other post-military projects ===
Other noteworthy projects that Douglass led or was a major contributor in included surveying the Brooklyn and Jamaica Railroad route, the design of a major water delivery system for New York City, and the design of two garden cemeteries based on his design of Green-Wood: Albany Rural Cemetery in Menands, New York (1845–1846), and Mount Hermon Cemetery (1848), located on the outskirts of Quebec City. Douglass was also originally awarded the design of the High Bridge of the Croton Aqueduct system, but was later fired.

=== Final years ===
In October 1848, Douglass was appointed Professor of Mathematics at Hobart College, then known as Geneva College. In October 1849, he died of a stroke.

== See also ==
- Bishop Charles McIlvaine
