= William Charles Henry Wood =

Canadian historian and author

- Born: June 7, 1864; Quebec City, Canada East
- Died: September 2, 1947 (aged 83); Quebec City, Quebec
- Resting place: Mount Hermon Cemetery, Sillery, Quebec, Canada
- Occupation: Historian
- Known for: Books, nature conservation, scouts
- Military career
- Allegiance: Canadian
- Branch: Royal Rifles of Canada
- Service years: 1887-1918
- Rank: Lieutenant-Colonel
- Unit: 8th Regiment

William Charles Henry Wood (7 June 1864 – 2 September 1947) was a Canadian historian, Scout leader and naturalist.

Wood was born on 7 June 1864 in Quebec City. He was the son of George Augustus Leslie Wood, merchant, and Charlotte Feodore Louisa Augusta Guérout. He served in the Royal Rifles of Canada from 1887 to the end of the World War I achieving the rank of Lieutenant-Colonel. He was active in literary and history circles and served as President of the Quebec Literary and Historical Society. He was interested in nature conservation and advocated for bird sanctuaries in Labrador. He was also president of the scouts in Quebec in 1909.

He was a prolific chronicler of Canadian history and wrote several books on the subject, most notably a five volume set on the history of Quebec entitled, The Storied Province of Quebec. He received the Royal Society of Canada's J. B. Tyrrell Historical Medal in 1938.

He died in Quebec City in 1947 at the age of 83. Wood was buried in Mount Hermon Cemetery in Sillery.

== Selected works ==
- The Fight for Canada (1909),
- The Loss of the Conquest of Canada (1909),
- Tercentenial Quebec (1910),
- One Sea, One Fleet (1910),
- Animal Sanctuaries in Labrador Book of Canada (1911, with AG Doughty),
- In the Heart of Old Canada (1912),
- All Afloat (1914),
- The Passing of New France (1914),
- The Great War of 1915 (1915)
- The War of the United States (1915),
- Flags of the Civil War (1921),
- Unique Quebec (1924),
- The Winning of Freedom (1927),
- In Defense of Liberty (1928),
- The Storied Province of Quebec (in five volumes, 1931–32)
