= Richard Turner (Canadian Army officer) =

Canadian Army general and recipient of the Victoria Cross (1871-1961)

Sir Richard Turner VC, KCB, KCMG, DSO, CD
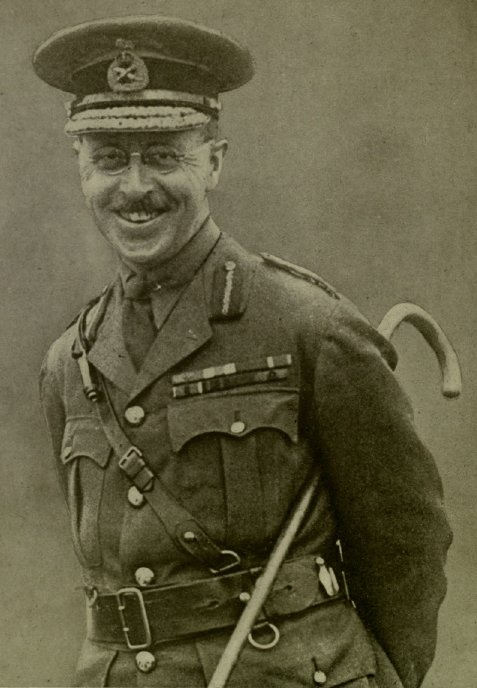
- Lieutenant General Sir Richard Turner in 1917 during the First World War.
- Born: 25 July 1871; Quebec City, Canada
- Died: 19 June 1961 (aged 89); Sainte-Foy, Quebec, Canada
- Burial place: Mount Hermon Cemetery, Sillery, Quebec, Canada
- Relatives: Richard Turner (father)
- Military career
- Allegiance: Canada
- Branch: Canadian Militia
- Service years: 1892–1919
- Rank: Lieutenant General
- Units: Queen's Own Canadian Hussars; The Royal Canadian Dragoons
- Commands: 2nd Canadian Division; 3rd Canadian Brigade
- Conflicts: Second Boer War; First World War
- Awards: Victoria Cross; Knight Commander of the Order of the Bath; Knight Commander of the Order of St Michael and St George; Distinguished Service Order; Mentioned in Despatches; Légion d'honneur (France); Croix de guerre 1914–1918 (France); Order of the White Eagle (Russia)

Lieutenant General Sir Richard Ernest William Turner (25 July 1871 – 19 June 1961) was a senior Canadian Army officer who served during the Second Boer War and the First World War, and was a recipient of the Victoria Cross. While Turner always displayed great personal courage while under fire, he lacked the acumen for brigade- and division-sized tactics, and the men under his command during the First World War suffered grievous losses in several battles before he was moved into administrative roles.

== Early life ==
Turner was born in Quebec City, the son of Richard Turner, and worked at his father's grocery and lumber business, rising to partner before the First World War. He later took over the business, when he returned from the War. Turner joined the militia as a second lieutenant in 1892, his regiment of choice for commissioning being the Queen's Own Canadian Hussars.

== Boer War ==
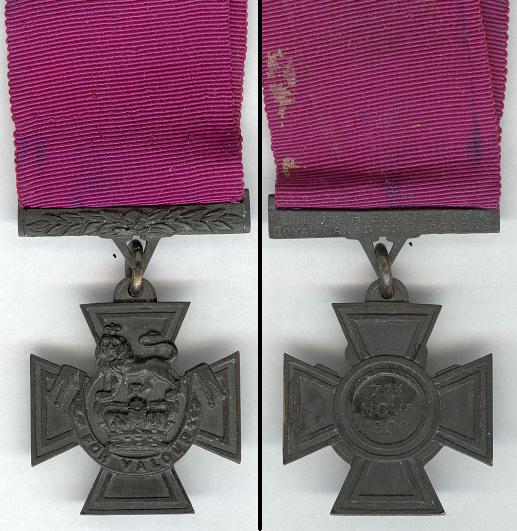
Obverse and reverse of Turner's VC

Turner was 29 years old and a major in the Militia cavalry regiment the 10th Queen's Own Canadian Hussars when he joined the second Canadian contingent to the Second Boer War. He reverted to lieutenant to join The Royal Canadian Dragoons, Canadian Army. He was awarded the Distinguished Service Order (DSO) with effective date 29 November 1900 for his actions at the Vet River on 6 May 1900.

On 7 November 1900, during a desperate rearguard action at the Leliefontein near the Komati River, Turner and Lieutenant Hampden Cockburn commanded a small group of men who repulsed a large force of Boers at close range, allowing two field guns to escape capture. Following the action, Turner and Cockburn were two of three men from their regiment who were subsequently awarded the Victoria Cross for bravery. (The other was Sergeant Edward Holland.)

Turner was Mentioned in Despatches on 16 April 1901, and the VC citations were published in The London Gazette on 23 April 1901. Turner's read:

Later in the day when the Boers again seriously threatened to capture the guns, Lieutenant Turner, although twice previously wounded, dismounted and deployed his men at close quarters and drove off the Boers, thus saving the guns.

He received the VC from the Duke of Cornwall and York (later King George V) during a grand military review in Quebec 17 September 1901, the second day of the visit to Canada of the Duke and Duchess of Cornwall and York during their Commonwealth tour. His Victoria Cross is currently stored as part of the RCD Archives and Collection at CFB Petawawa, Ontario.

== Pre-war service ==
Turner was in command of a contingent of Canadian troops present in London for the Coronation of King Edward VII and Queen Alexandra on 9 August 1902.

== First World War ==
Promoted to brigadier general just after the outbreak of war on 29 September 1914, Turner was given command of the 3rd Brigade in the 1st Division of the Canadian Expeditionary Force (CEF). His brigade major was the then-Colonel Garnet Hughes, son of Sam Hughes, the bombastic Minister of Militia and Defence in Robert Borden's government.

The 1st Division spent the winter of 1914–15 training in England, and were sent to France in February 1915. After a period of indoctrination about the realities of trench warfare, they took control of a section of trench in the Ypres Salient on 17 April 1915. Only five days later, the Germans used poison gas for the first time on the Western Front, sending clouds of chlorine wafting over the Allied trenches. French colonial troops on the Canadians' left flank broke, leaving an enormous hole in the Allied line.

In the chaos that followed, both Turner and Hughes sent erroneous messages back to Lieutenant General Edwin Alderson at divisional headquarters that their line had been broken and was in full retreat, when in fact the 3rd Brigade had not even been attacked yet. Turner was also responsible for sending two reserve battalions forward in a night-time attack on Kitcheners Wood, although he left the details to his subordinate Hughes. Much of the subsequent high casualty rate during the attack can be attributed to Hughes and his insistence on an immediate attack before proper reconnaissance could reveal the presence of enfilading machine gun nests. Although Turner demonstrated great personal bravery when his brigade headquarters came under direct small arms fire and suffered several near misses from artillery, he seemed unable to adequately cope with this new type of trench warfare nor with the demands of brigade-sized tactics.

On the second day of the battle, Turner's brigade came under heavy attack, but was holding its position and repulsing the enemy despite losses from a second gas attack and heavy and accurate artillery fire. Alderson, believing that the Canadian division was capable of holding the line, ordered his brigade commanders to move reserves up to the front line to reinforce losses rather than withdraw. However, Turner made a sudden and unilateral decision to withdraw his brigade back to the General Headquarters (GHQ) line, several miles to the rear. Not only did Turner not inform Alderson, his commanding officer, of his decision, he also did not tell Brigadier General Arthur Currie, commanding the 2nd Brigade on Turner's right, that Currie's flank was now completely unprotected. (Currie would be forced to withdraw his brigade the next day, albeit in an orderly fashion, in order to avoid having his flank rolled up.) Turner's orders were also very dangerous to the well-being of his men – companies in the front line were in close contact with the enemy; when they left the relative safety of their trenches to retreat across hundreds of yards of open fields in broad daylight, the companies of the 3rd Brigade were subject to accurate and devastating small arms and artillery fire, and suffered grievous losses. This was exacerbated by the uncoordinated nature of the withdrawal – the orders arrived at various companies at different times, leaving each to withdraw as best it could, without the benefit of covering fire from other units. Some never received the withdrawal order, or the order arrived too late; they were flanked, surrounded and either captured or killed. Most devastating to the Allies, the 3rd Brigade's sudden withdrawal opened a 4,000-yard hole in their front line. Only the relative reticence of the Germans prevented an immediate catastrophe; having encountered stiff resistance from the Canadians the previous day, the Germans were not expecting a withdrawal, and were not positioned to immediately exploit the gap in the Allied front line the same day.

As the battle raged on, Turner travelled back to Corps headquarters to consult with his commanding officer, Edwin Alderson. The normally reserved Alderson exchanged sharp words with Turner about the unauthorized withdrawal of the 3rd Brigade, a withdrawal that now threatened the entire Ypres Salient. Historian George Cassar is of the opinion that, had Turner not been a popular Boer War hero and politically well-connected back in Canada, Alderson would have relieved him of command on the spot.

Turner was replaced as brigade commander by R. G. E. Leckie on 12 August 1915. His subsequent promotion to divisional command was opposed by Alderson, who considered him to be incompetent. However the well-connected Turner had the support of Sam Hughes and other Canadian politicians, and Alderson was overruled. Alderson bitterly wrote, "I am sorry to say that I do not consider Turner really fit to command a Division and his name was not put forward by Sir John French, but Canadian politics have been too strong for all of us and so he has got it." Turner was subsequently appointed a Companion of the Order of the Bath (CB) in the King's Birthday Honours of June 1915, and promoted to major general in September 1915, and given command of the 2nd Division when it arrived in France. However, the division suffered heavy losses during the battle of St. Eloi in April 1916 when Turner lost communication with his division and did not form a clear picture of where they were on the confused battlefield. In addition, due to a miscommunication, his men were decimated by their own artillery, suffering 1,600 casualties as German soldiers retook the land, negating the gains made at heavy cost just a few days before. General Sir Herbert Plumer, the commander of British 2nd Army who had overall responsibility for the front, demanded the immediate dismissal of the 6th Brigade's commander, Turner's subordinate Huntly Ketchen, and when Turner claimed that if Ketchen was dismissed he would resign, the Canadian Corps' commander, Alderson, sought Turner's dismissal as well. Both officers were supporters of Sam Hughes, who made it clear in no uncertain terms to Commander in Chief Sir Douglas Haig that if Turner went then Haig could no longer rely on Canadian support. This led to the diplomatic compromise of Alderson being relieved of his corps command and replaced by Julian Byng, while Turner and Ketchen retained their commands.

Turner was eventually relieved of field command on 5 December 1916 and shunted into administrative duties, becoming commander of Canadian forces operating in Britain and the Canadian government's chief military adviser.

Turner was appointed a Knight Commander of the Order of St Michael and St George (KCMG) in the King's Birthday Honours of June 1917, and promoted to lieutenant general on 9 June 1917. On 18 May 1918, he became the Chief of the General Staff, Overseas Military Forces of Canada. In addition, he was awarded the Croix de Guerre avec Palme and the Legion d'Honneur from the French government, and the Russian Order of the White Eagle with Swords.

== Bibliography ==
- Stewart, William Frederick (2015). Embattled General: Sir Richard Turner and the First World War. McGill–Queen's University Press. ISBN 978-0773546257.

== See also ==
- Mount Turner (Alberta)

Military offices
Preceded by Sam Steele	GOC 2nd Canadian Infantry Division; 1915–1916	Succeeded by Henry Burstall
