= Hazard Bailey Terrill =

Canadian politician

Hazard Bailey Terrill (8 December 1811 – 29 October 1852) was a lawyer and political figure in Canada East.

He was born in Ascot Township, Sherbrooke, Lower Canada, in 1811, the son of Joseph Hazard Terrill, commissioner of small causes at Sherbrooke. He studied law, articling with Edward Short, and was admitted to the bar in 1835. He established a practice at Stanstead in 1836.

In 1851, he was elected to the 4th Parliament of the Province of Canada representing Stanstead. He died of cholera at Quebec City, in 1852, 40-years of age, while still in office. Hazard Bailey Terrill was buried at Mount Hermon Cemetery in Sillery.

His brother, Timothy Lee Terrill, was elected to the same seat in a by-election held in November 1852.
