= Morrin College =

Former higher education institution

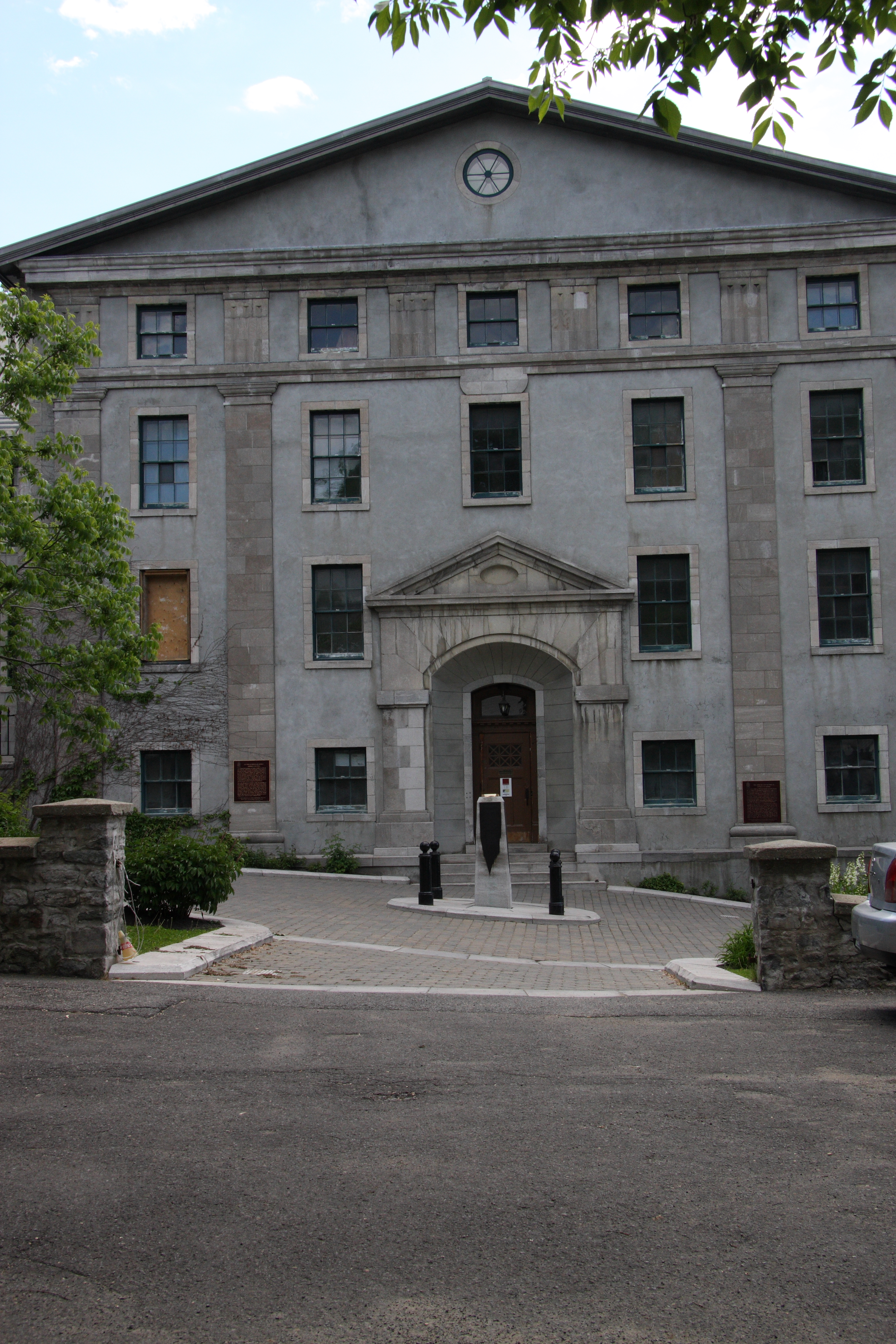
- Morrin College occupied this former prison between 1868 and 1902
- Type: anglophone institute of higher education
- Active: 1862–1902, continues as charitable organisation
- Affiliations: Presbyterian
- Location: Quebec City, Quebec, Canada

Morrin College, the first anglophone institute of higher education in Quebec City, Quebec, Canada flourished between the years 1862 and 1902.

== History ==
It was founded following an important bequest from Joseph Morrin, former city mayor and prominent doctor. The college initially occupied rooms rented from the Masonic Temple from 1862 to 1868. It then moved to its permanent headquarters in François Baillairgé's 1808 city gaol at 44, Chaussée des Écossais (then Rue Saint-Stanislas) after architect Joseph-Ferdinand Peachy remodelled the building.

Although officially open to everyone, Morrin College was very much a Presbyterian institution. It attracted some Protestants of other denominations, but few Roman Catholics. The school’s founder and Principal for 31 of its 40 years was the Reverend John Cook, Minister of Saint-Andrew’s Church across the street.

== Faculties ==
A Faculty of Divinity within the school formed a total of 24 Presbyterian ministers. In addition to this, a Faculty of Arts and a short-lived Faculty of Law had a wider appeal. Morrin College was affiliated in Arts with McGill University from 1863 to 1900.

== Legacy ==
Morrin College struggled from the very beginning. In addition to persistent financial problems, the Anglo-Protestant population of Quebec City was too small to justify an institution of its kind. It never had more than 9 paid professors and 28 full-time students. The institution discontinued regular classes around 1902. It continued to administer the college building and adjacent properties until 1988.

The Board of Governors of Morrin College still meets, and continues to administer a fund for the purposes of education. Past financial contributions have ensured the survival of the Literary and Historical Society of Quebec at a precarious time in the early 20th century. The Society now manages the former Morrin College building, now known as the Morrin Centre.

== Notable alumni ==
A total of 46 students graduated with a McGill BA. The school was also a local pioneer in terms of women's education, allowing female students to study for a BA in co-ed classes from 1885. A few people who later went on to illustrious careers taught at the college, namely Edwin Hatch, James Douglas Jr., and George Mercer Dawson.

- Salem Bland (1877), Methodist theologian and Social Gospel leader
- Albert Joseph Brown (1883), Canadian Senator
- Robert Cassels (1866), first registrar of the Supreme Court of Canada
- Ethel Margaret Fraser (1894), Physician, Head of the American Women's Hospitals at La-Ferté-Milon, France during WWI
- Euphemia MacLeod (1889), Poet, First woman M.A. Philosophy in Quebec
- Henry James Morgan (?), Biographer
- George C. Pidgeon (1892), Minister, first moderator of the United Church of Canada
- John T. Ross (1883), Businessman, Director of the Quebec Bank
- James Hossack Woods (?), Editor of the Calgary Herald

== See also ==
- List of historic places in Quebec
