= 10th Queen's Own Canadian Hussars =

Queen's Own Canadian Hussars; 10th Queen's Own Canadian Hussars
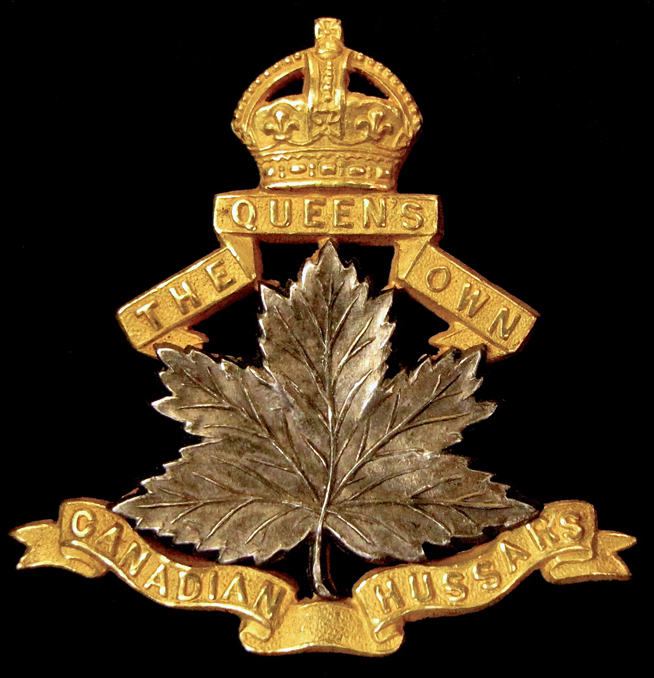
- Regimental cap badge
- Active: 13 November 1856 – 15 August 1913; 1 August 1928 – 1 February 1936
- Country: Canada
- Branch: Canadian Militia
- Type: Hussars
- Role: Cavalry
- Size: One regiment
- Part of: Non-Permanent Active Militia
- Garrison/HQ: Quebec City, Quebec
- Engagements: Second Boer War
- Battle honours: N/A

The 10th Queen's Own Canadian Hussars (QOCH) was a cavalry regiment of the Non-Permanent Active Militia (this was the name of the part-time volunteer Canadian land force before the formation of the Canadian Army in 1940) which existed between 1856 and 1913 and 1928 and 1936.

Although the unit did not take part in any fixed actions of its own, various officers and men were incorporated as volunteers into Canadian overseas forces such as the Canadian Mounted Rifles in the Second Boer War, where some distinguished themselves such as Lieutenant-General Richard Turner, who, as a lieutenant serving with the Royal Canadian Dragoons (RCD), won the Victoria Cross at Leliefontein, one of three members of the RCD who were given the award for the same action.

== History ==
The regiment was originally raised on 13 November 1856 at Quebec City with the name the Queen's Own Canadian Hussars and was, until 1880, the only cavalry regiment in the province of Quebec.

Between 1900 and 1913 it was part of the 4th Cavalry Brigade, 5th Division, in Military District No. 5. Renamed the 10th Queen's Own Canadian Hussars in 1903. It was disbanded on 15 August 1913.

On 1 August 1928 the 10th were re-raised, again in Quebec City, but disbanded permanently on 1 February 1936 along with 13 other regiments as part of the 1936 militia reorganization.

Although not sent as a unit to the Second Boer War, some personnel volunteered to serve with the Canadian Mounted Rifles (CMR), which was raised to soldier in that campaign. Various sources list individuals from the QOCH who were attached to the CMR (First Contingent) such as the following members of "E" Company (Montreal):

- Dynes, E. J.
- Home, F.
- Lee, F.
- Sheehan, M.
- Tregett, J.

Amongst the number who volunteered for service against the Boer republics was 29-year-old Richard Turner, who had been commissioned into the QOCH as a lieutenant, rising to the rank of major. In order to serve overseas he dropped rank to lieutenant and joined the Royal Canadian Dragoons. During his service there he gained the Victoria Cross along with two other RCD soldiers, Lieutenant Hampden Cockburn and Sergeant Edward Holland. Turner was given command of the 10th QOCH as a lieutenant-colonel. He was eventually promoted to lieutenant-general during the First World War, although his career finished ignominiously after a friendly fire incident near the town of St. Eloi in September 1916. This resulted in him being removed from command and given administrative jobs for the rest of his time with the Canadian forces.

== Uniform and badge ==
The uniform was similar to that of Imperial hussar regiments: dark blue with gold frogging on the jacket and a double yellow stripe on the trousers. Unlike other Canadian hussar regiments the QOCH also wore a busby similar to their imperial cousins. The rest of the Canadian hussars (with the exception of the 8th) wore a white pith helmet until they replaced them with busbies in the early 1900s.

The badge had a blackened silver maple leaf as the central device and was attached to the main body by two pins. The rest of the badge is gilded. The collar dogs (badges worn on the lapel) were all gilt.

== Notable members ==
- Lieutenant-General Richard Turner

== See also ==
- List of regiments of cavalry of the Canadian Militia (1900–1920)
- History of the Canadian Army
