= Frank Carrel =

Canadian politician

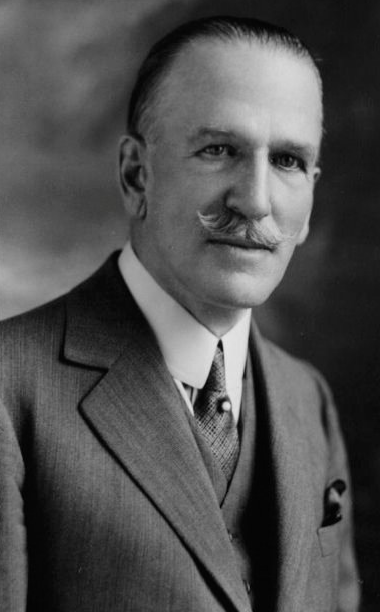

Member of the Legislative Council of Quebec for Golfe
- In office 1918–1940
- Preceded by: Richard Turner
- Succeeded by: Jules-André Brillant

Personal details
- Born: September 7, 1870 Quebec City, Quebec
- Died: July 30, 1940 (aged 69) Quebec City, Quebec
- Resting place: Mount Hermon Cemetery, Sillery, Quebec, Canada
- Party: Liberal

Frank Carrel (7 September 1870 — 30 July 1940) was a Canadian journalist, publisher, and politician.

In 1918, he was appointed to the Legislative Council of Quebec for Golfe. A Liberal, he served until his death in 1940.

He was buried at Mount Hermon Cemetery in Sillery, on 1 August 1940.
