= Morrin Centre =

Cultural centre in Quebec, Canada

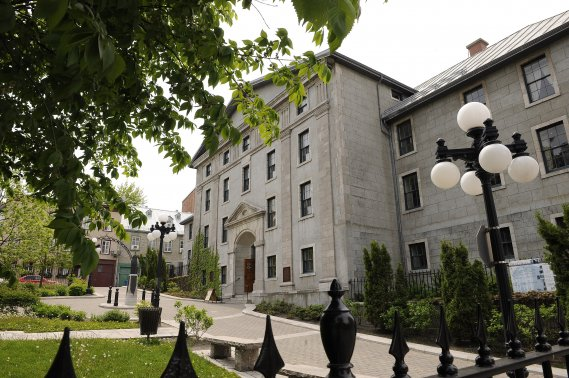
- Location: 44, chaussée des Écossais; Quebec City, Quebec; G1R 4H3
- Coordinates: 46°48′46″N 71°12′38″W
- Website: www.morrin.org

National Historic Site of Canada
- Official name: Morrin College / Former Quebec Prison National Historic Site of Canada
- Designated: 1984

Patrimoine culturel du Québec
- Official name: Édifice du Morrin College
- Type: Classified heritage immovable
- Designated: 1981
- Reference no.: 92687

The Morrin Centre is a cultural centre in the Old Quebec neighbourhood of Quebec City, Quebec, Canada. It is designed to educate the public about the historic contribution and present-day culture of local English-speakers. The centre contains the private English-language library of the Literary and Historical Society of Quebec, heritage spaces for events, and interpretation services. The English-language library has been located in the Morrin Centre since 1868. The Library is the repository of the LHSQ's collection of historical documents, including copies of the society's journal, Transactions. These documents include original, scientific, historical, and literary articles from the nineteenth century, as well as reprints of older historical primary sources found in archives around the world. In order to access these materials, one must be a member of the library.

== History ==
It is located in a former prison building that has been designated a National Historic Site of Canada.

This site has served four different functions:

- Royal Redoubt (1712–1808)
- Quebec City Common Gaol (1812–1867)
- Morrin College (1868-c. 1902)
- Literary and Historical Society of Quebec (1868–present)

In 2004, the Literary and Historical Society of Quebec became owners of the historic site through an emphyteutic lease.

In the last decade, the Society has broadened its mandate. The building was entirely renovated, and transformed into the Morrin Centre, which not only houses the library but also acts as Quebec City’s English-language cultural centre and a historical interpretation site.

== Affiliations ==
The Museum is affiliated with: CMA and CHIN.
