= M1895 Colt–Browning machine gun =

American machine gun

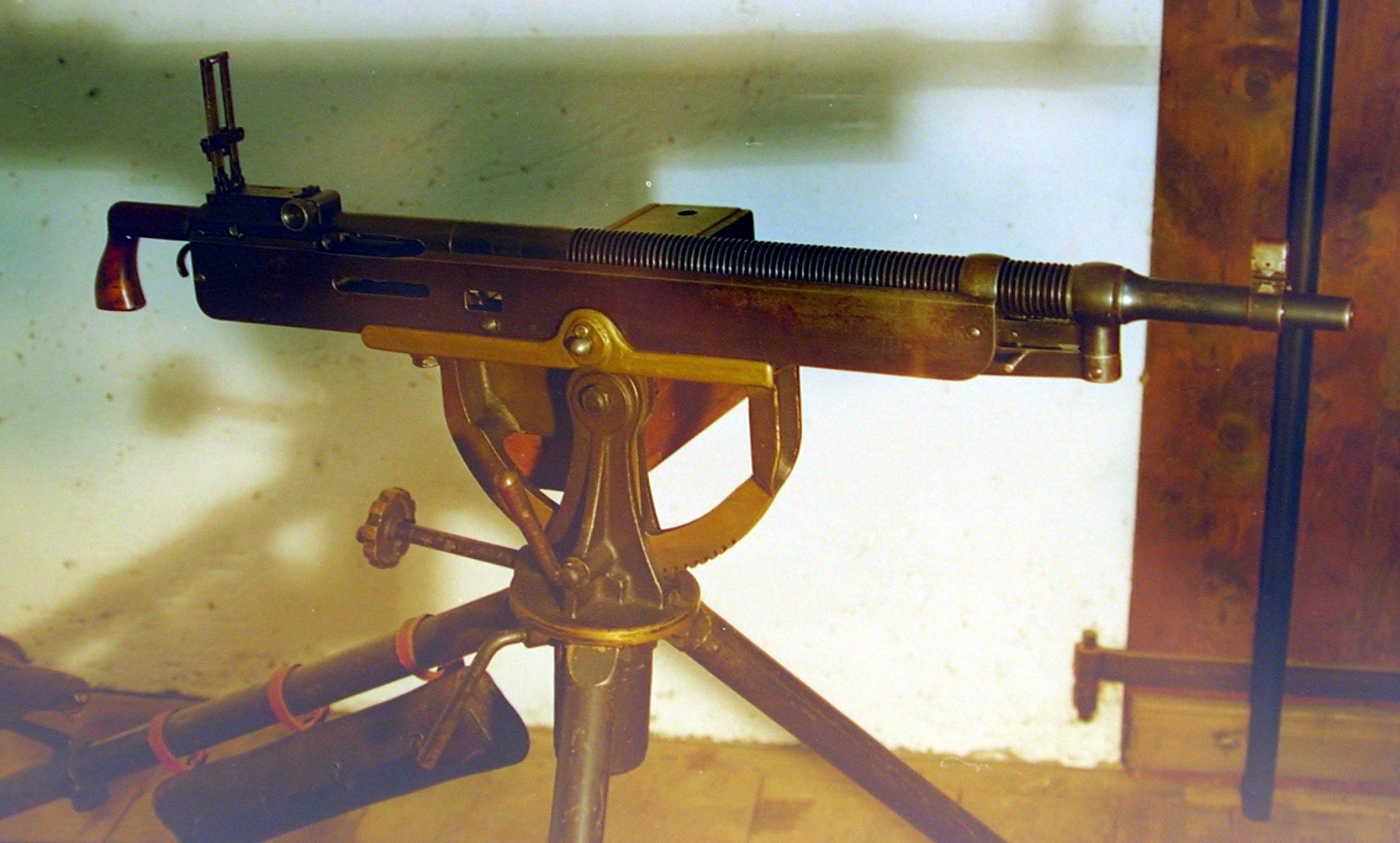
- Colt–Browning M1895/14 machine gun in 7mm Mauser caliber, possibly used in the Mexican Revolution.
- Type: Heavy machine gun
- Place of origin: United States

Service history
- Used by: See § Users
- Wars: See § Conflicts

Production history
- Designer: John M. Browning; Matthew S. Browning; Carl Gustave Swebilius (Note: Designer of the Marlin-Rockwell M1917 and M1918.)
- Designed: 1889–1895
- Manufacturer: Colt; Marlin Rockwell
- Variants: See § Variants

Specifications
- Mass: 41.4 kg (91.27 lb) (Fully Loaded): Gun: 16 kg (35.27 lb); Tripod: 25.4 kg (56.00 lb)
- Length: 1,040 mm (40.94 in)
- Barrel length: 711 mm (27.99 in)
- Shell: US Service: 6×60mmSR (.236 Navy); 7.62×59mmR (.30-40 Krag); 7.62×63mm (.30-06 Springfield); Export: 6.5×52mm (6.5mm Carcano); 7×57mm (7mm Mauser); 7.62×54mmR (.30 Russian); 7.7×56mmR (.303 British)
- Action: Gas-operated, lever actuated closed bolt firing cycle
- Carriage: Tripod
- Rate of fire: 400–450 rounds/min
- Feed system: Belt
- Sights: Iron sights

The Colt–Browning M1895, nicknamed "potato digger" because of its unusual operating mechanism, is an air-cooled, belt-fed, gas-operated machine gun that fires from a closed bolt with a cyclic rate of 450 rounds per minute. Based on an 1889 design by John Browning and his brother Matthew S. Browning, it was the first successful gas-operated machine gun to enter service.

== Operating mechanism ==
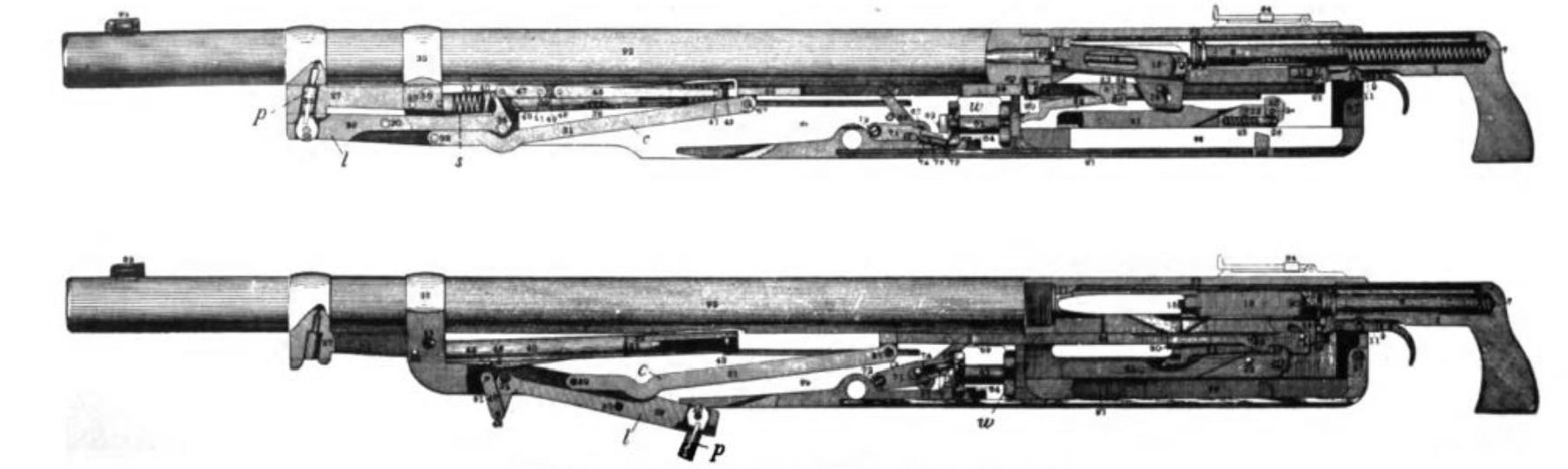
M1895 operating mechanism showing the lever (P) in the forward (top) and rear (bottom) positions

Filed for patent in 1892, the M1895's operating mechanism is one of John and Matthew S. Browning's early patents for automatic rifles; they had previously been working on lever-action rifles for Winchester such as the Winchester 1886.

In a typical lever-action design, the operating lever lies under the rear of the gun, typically below the stock, and is hinged near the breech area. It is operated by rotating the lever down and forward, which causes the breechblock to slide rearward away from the barrel and eject the spent round. The potato digger mechanism, in effect, bears some similarities to the basic lever action design; it uses a lever that is powered by the expanding gases that are propelling the bullet down the barrel, rather than the operator's hands.

The M1895 uses a tilting bolt to lock into position when firing, the first example of such in a machine gun design. The bolt slides forward and rearward within a slot in the receiver area, held forward by a spring inside the tube that also holds the operator's grip handle. As it moves forward the bolt eventually meets the barrel. At that point a cam below the bolt dropped into a hole which allowed the rear of the bolt to tilt downward, seating it against the rear of the breech and locking it in a closed bolt position for firing. The bolt actuates an auto sear releasing a linear hammer when in-battery to fire the weapon.

As the bullet travels down the barrel after firing, it eventually passes a hole drilled in the bottom of the barrel known as a port. The hot gasses behind the bullet flow into the port and push down on a plug, marked p in the diagrams. This causes the plug to pop out of the hole with some velocity. The plug is attached to one end of a short lever, l, while the other end of the lever is connected to a hinge below the barrel. The motion of the plug causes the entire lever to rotate down and to the rear, around the hinge point. This action is essentially front-to-back version of the typical back-to-front motion of a lever action rifle. The end point of this motion can be seen in the lower diagram, with the lever having traveled through an arc of about 160 degrees. A spring located at the hinge is compressed by this motion, and eventually causes the lever to rotate forward again, forcing the plug back into the port and holding it there when it is not in motion.

Connected to the midpoint of the rotating lever is a long metal arm. The motion of the lever causes this arm to be forced rearward, pushing the entire breech mechanism with it. The rear end of this mechanism presses on the cam, forcing the bolt upward and unlocking it. Continued motion slides the bolt rearward against the spring, while also operating the mechanism that feeds the ammunition belt and readies the next round. When it reaches the end of its motion the spring pushes everything forward again, carrying the new bullet with it and seating it in the barrel before locking again.

== Development ==
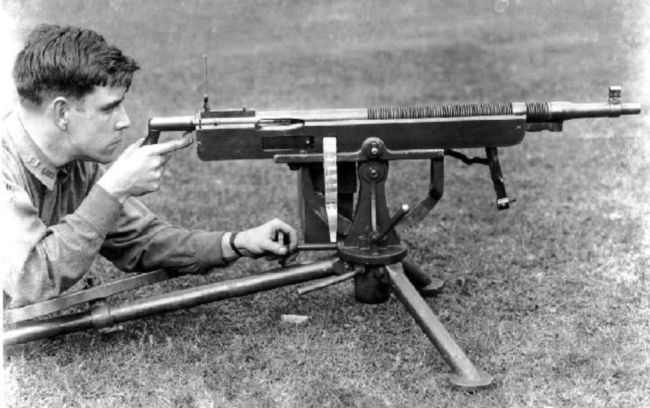
One of the later versions of the Colt-Browning M1895 machine gun is demonstrated by Captain (later Major General) Julian Hatcher. The gun is shown mid-action, with the operating lever extending downward below the front of the barrel.

The earliest prototype developed by Browning in fall 1889 was a .44-40 black powder cartridge rifle, weighing under 12 pounds (5.4 kg). This version placed the operating lever at the front of the barrel, and was acted on directly by the muzzle blast. An improved design was offered to Colt in 1892. The lever was moved rearward, and power was supplied by a gas port about six inches (15 cm) back from the muzzle.

To minimize heating during rapid fire, the gun used a very heavy straight contour barrel, bringing its weight up to 35 pounds (15.8 kg). Later versions added prominent finning to aid air cooling. The standard tripod mount with seat for the gunner added another 56 pounds (25.4 kg). Despite the heavy barrel, the closed bolt mechanism would cook off shots if a round was left chambered in a hot barrel. This required that the gun be unloaded immediately after an extended burst of firing. During testing of the gun, it was found to be capable of firing extended bursts of over 1,000 rounds before the barrel overheated and bullets began to tumble out of control; upon stopping, the red-hot barrel cooked off four or five additional shots before cooling down.

The gun was originally chambered in 6mm Lee Navy and later, after the adoption of the Krag–Jørgensen rifle, in .30-40 Krag, 7×57mm Mauser caliber (the same cartridge used in the Spanish Model 1893 Mauser), and .30-06 Springfield in 1914. The 1914 version also included a lower tripod for firing prone; this is likely what led to the gun's nickname of "potato digger", as the operating lever would dig into the ground if it were fired from too low a position.

The M1895 was made for export as well; the Russians ordered several thousand M1895 machine guns in 1914 in 7.62×54mmR caliber for use in World War I. In .303 British caliber, the M1895/14 saw service in the United Kingdom and France. The M1895 was also sold in 7×57mm Mauser caliber for use by various countries in South America.

The Colt's unusual method of operation had both advantages and disadvantages compared to competing machine gun designs of the day. The lever-operated repeating action gave the weapon a relatively low rate of fire (less than 400 rounds a minute). However, the low rate of fire combined with a heavy barrel also allowed the gun to be air-cooled, resulting in a simpler, lighter, and more portable machine gun compared to water-cooled designs. Though combat reports of action stoppages were not uncommon, most of these could be overcome by manually cycling the action. As gunners gained experience with operating an air-cooled machine gun, it became apparent that avoiding long continuous periods of fire materially added to the weapon's reliability and barrel life.

== Use ==
The M1895 was the first machine gun adopted by the United States military, and it saw service with the Army (who never formally adopted it), and the US Navy/US Marines, and was adapted to use in many roles. It was mounted on tripods, horse-drawn carriages, boats, aircraft, and even armored cars. The US Navy was the first to begin testing, as early as 1893, with a version chambered in the Navy's 6mm cartridge.

=== Early conflicts ===
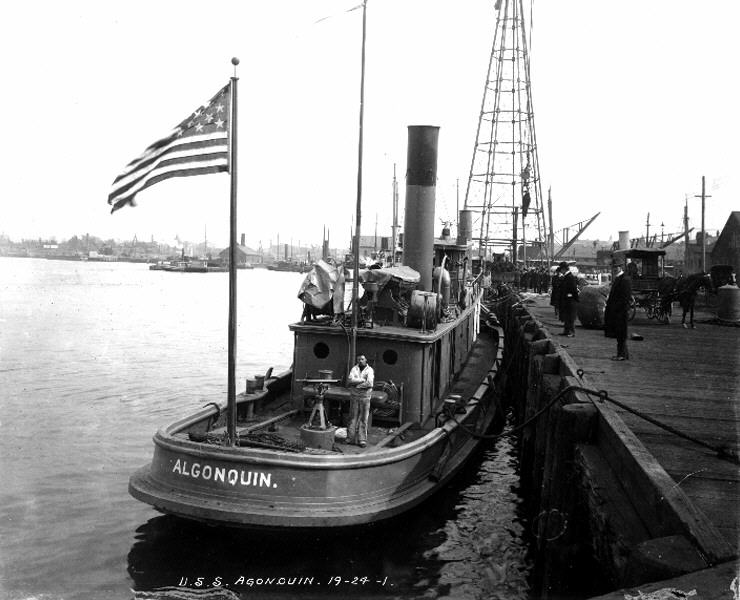
USS Algonquin (1898–1946) at the Brooklyn Navy Yard in 1898 with a 6mm machine gun mounted on a pedestal on the aft deck.

In 6mm Lee Navy caliber, the M1895 saw service with the United States Marines during the Spanish–American War, including the 1898 invasion of Guantanamo Bay, where a Marine battalion deployed four Colt guns (two of them borrowed from USS Texas's armory). The M1895 proved to be a significant advance in firepower for the Marines, who employed them in the first known use of machine guns by the American military to provide tactical support of infantry forces during an assault. In contrast, Army regular forces in the campaign were still burdened with heavy, manually operated Gatling guns that required heavy artillery carriages pulled by mule transport. Lt. Colonel Roosevelt's Rough Riders, a dismounted volunteer cavalry regiment that fought in Cuba, also deployed two M1895 Colt machine guns in 7×57mm Mauser caliber (built for export, both guns were privately purchased for the Rough Riders by family members of the troops), but although they did cause some Spanish casualties were reportedly somewhat unreliable. As Lt. Col. Roosevelt noted, "These Colt automatic guns were not, on the whole, very successful...they proved more delicate than the Gatlings, and very readily got out of order." The two M1895 guns were transferred to Lt. John Parker's Gatling Gun Detachment, who used them in the siege of Santiago.

The M1895 in 6mm Lee was also utilized by American Naval and Marine forces during the Philippine–American War, and the Boxer Rebellion, where it proved to be accurate and reliable. Around 1904 the Mexican government purchased 150 of these guns in 7mm Mauser caliber, and these guns were employed throughout the protracted Mexican Revolution. Use of the 7mm M1895 in the Mexican Revolution has been photographically documented, including the use of the gun by what appears to be a Villista. The US Navy also deployed some 6mm Lee M1895 guns from ship armories during the 1914 Vera Cruz fighting and occupation.

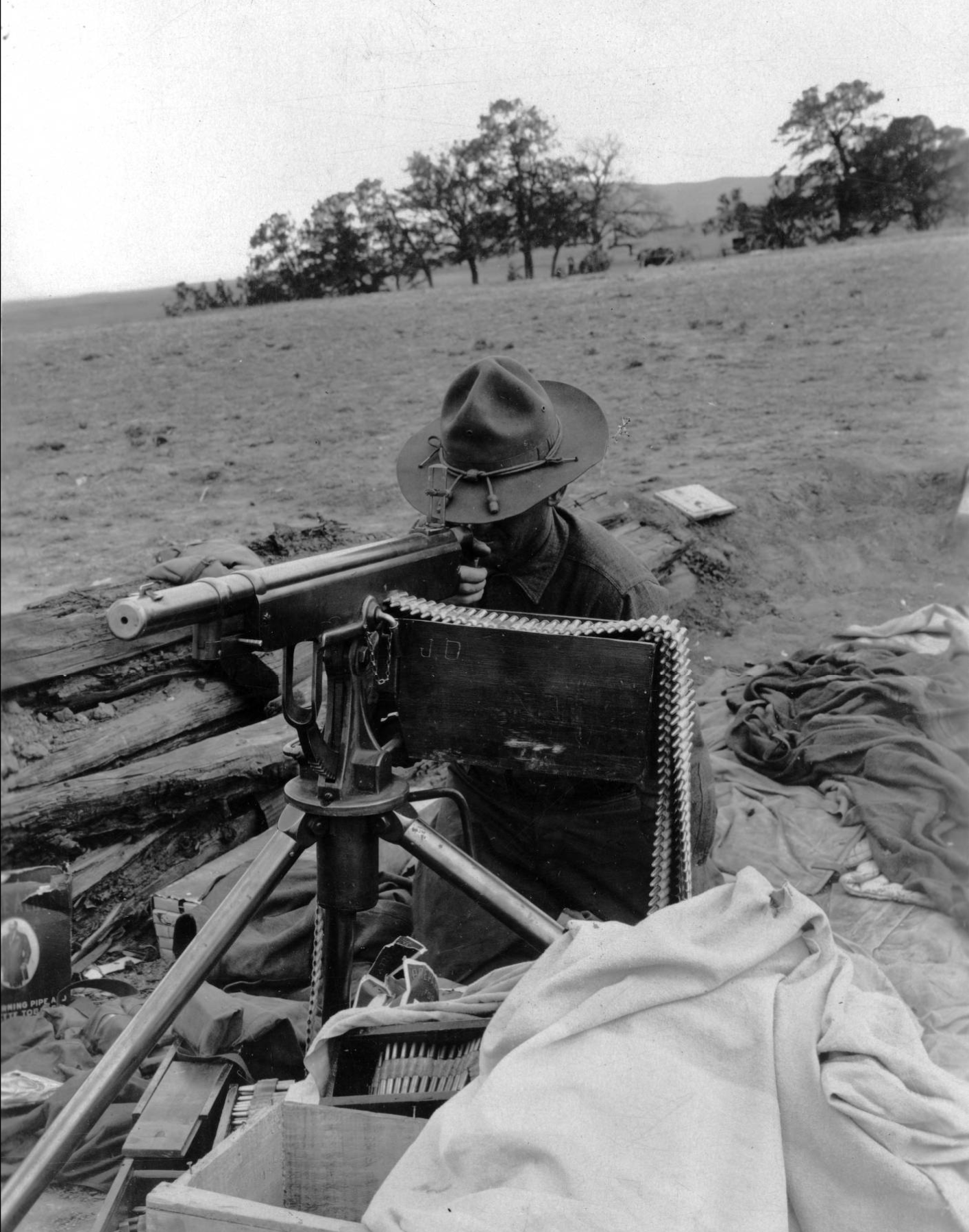
Colorado National Guardsman Sergeant John Davis manning a M1895 machine gun on Water Tank Hill, facing towards the striker's tent colony at Ludlow, Colorado during the Colorado Coalfield War, 1914.

The US Army, while never formally adopting the M1895, purchased two guns in 1902, followed by an additional purchase of 140 guns in 1904. These guns, along with small quantities of Maxim and Vickers guns, were issued to various units for evaluation purposes. These saw intermittent use by Army and National Guard Units at least until 1921. The first formally adopted machine gun by the US Army was the M1909 Benét–Mercié (Hotchkiss) machine-rifle, a bipod-mounted, strip-feed machine gun.

Further south, the M1895 was also used by the Uruguayan Army against rebels during a late flare-up of the Uruguayan Civil War in 1904.

Canadian mounted troops successfully used .303 M1895 guns in the Second Boer War (1899–1902). In one spectacular rear guard action at the Battle of Leliefontein on 7 November 1900, Sergeant Edward Holland of The Royal Canadian Dragoons used a Colt gun mounted on a Dundonald galloping carriage to stop a rare mounted Boer charge, resulting in his being awarded the Victoria Cross, one of three awarded to Canadians in that action. Winston Churchill, then a young Lieutenant in the South African Light Horse and a war correspondent, was impressed by the effect of the fire of a whole battery of these guns. The Canadian success with the M1895 led to the further use of the gun by the Canadian Army in World War I.

The M1895 was also used by various U.S. state militia and guard units, including the Colorado National Guard. A few of these guns fell into the hands of private militias staffed by mine company guards after the state discontinued funding of most of the guard units assigned to maintain order during the prolonged miners' strike that became the Colorado Coalfield War. In 1914, an emplaced "digger" of one of these private militias fired extensively into a miner camp in Ludlow, Colorado, an event later termed the Ludlow Massacre. A privately purchased M1895 also provided the main armament of an armored car of the Baldwin-Felts Detective Agency used to terrorize miners' camps during the strike, which the miners called the Death Special.

=== World War I ===
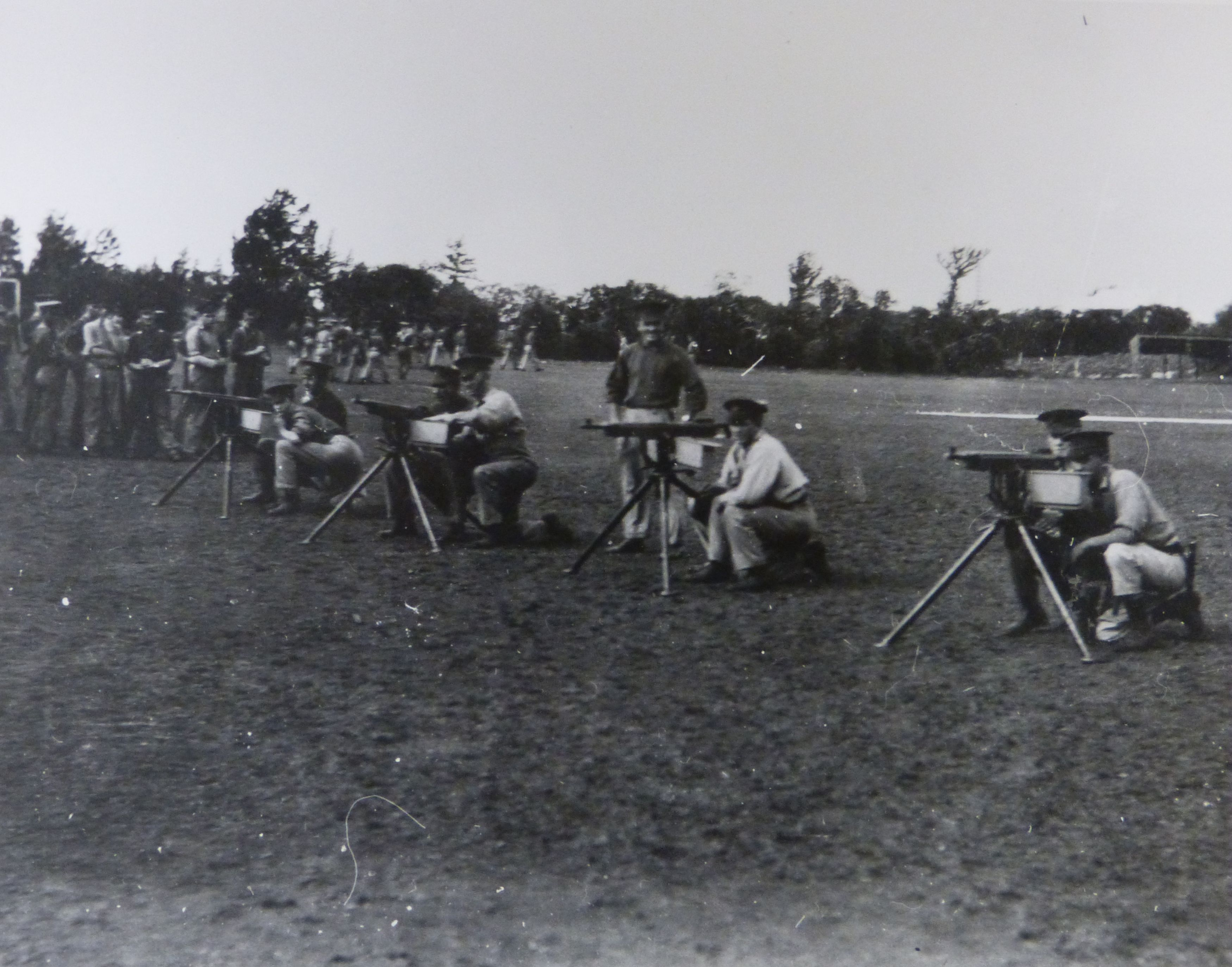
38th Battalion (Ottawa), CEF, with M1895 Colt–Browning machine guns at Prospect Camp, Bermuda, in 1915

The First Newfoundland Regiment of the British Army also purchased a Colt-Browning for training purposes in 1914. The M1895/14 Colt–Browning saw use in France by some Canadian infantry formations. Deploying to France in 1915, the 21st Battalion, CEF used .303-caliber M1895/14 machine guns in combat, as did the 10th Battalion, CEF which employed them until mid-1917 when they were replaced by the Lewis gun. The Colts were reallocated to equip formations of the Belgian Exile Army. The French also tested the .303 Colt and bought 1,000 in late 1914. They were used by the infantry and in aircraft. Additional Colt guns were sent to the Russians, who used them extensively.

While the United States used the M1895 for training, it was considered obsolete by the time the United States entered the war, and saw no service. Colt ceased production of the M1895 and variants in 1916 in order to concentrate on increased Vickers production, selling the machinery and rights to manufacture to Marlin Rockwell, who took over the still active Russian military and Italian Navy contracts.

==== Marlin Rockwell M1917/M1918 versions ====
After Marlin started making the Colt 1914s, it developed an improved version of the M1895. In 1917 this was adopted by the US Army as a training weapon and approximately 2,500 were purchased. Besides its designation of Colt–Browning M1895/14, it was also called the "Marlin Gun" and "Model 1917". The primary improvement was the use of a detachable barrel, a more generous side plate cut-out and a sliding door on the right side plate opening (also made larger) for easier access. Despite these improvements, as an air cooled machine gun, the Marlin was still limited to 500 rounds of continuous fire due to a tendency to overheat, typical for any air cooled weapon. The Navy also purchased a version of the Marlin gun with a gas piston in lieu of the lever mechanism, although very few if any guns saw service aboard ship.

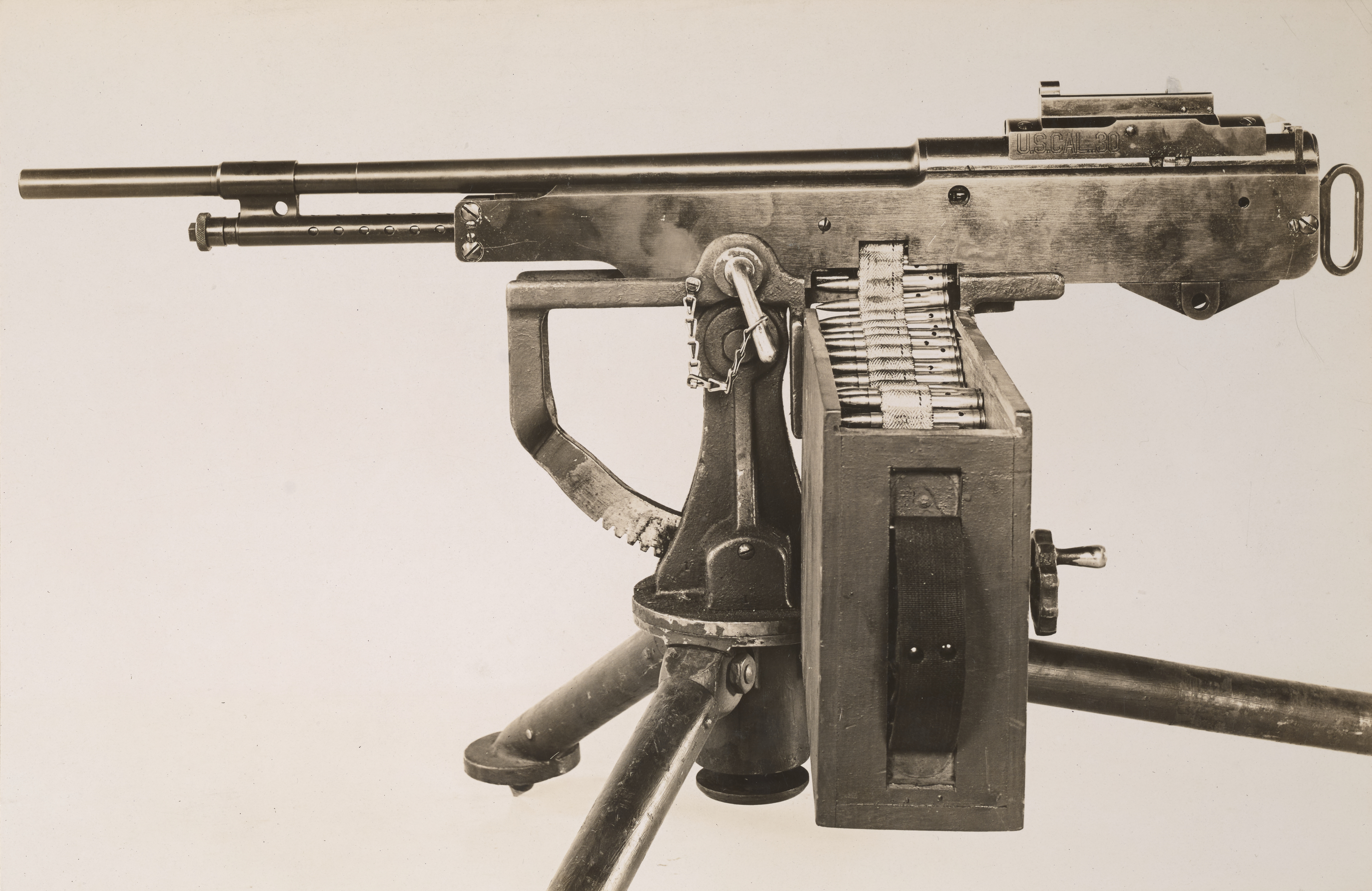
The Marlin M1917 used a different operating mechanism and bears only a passing resemblance to the M1895/14 it was based on.

A second, much more radical version of the M1895 was introduced in 1917 for tank and aircraft use, later designated the Marlin M1917 and M1918, with a Swedish armaments designer named Carl Gustave Swebilius responsible for the improvements. Like the Navy Marlins, these variants used a linear gas piston in place of the 'potato digger' arm and bore little outward physical resemblance to the basic "digger" design. The new reciprocating piston was located parallel to the barrel and below it, allowing the gun to be mounted lower to the ground. Another improvement was the addition of a breech-to-muzzle aluminum heat sink, with lengthwise fins and covering some 270° of the gun barrel's outer circumference's upper areas, to dissipate heat. Most Marlin M1917 and M1918 guns saw use in aircraft as defensive armament—however, as they retained the original M1895 "potato digger" ordnance's closed bolt firing cycle, these Marlin guns, weighing only some 25 pounds (11.34 kg) apiece, versus the standard Vickers gun's 33 pound (15 kg) figure for aviation use, could readily be used for forward-firing offensive armament with fighter aircraft, when used with synchronization gear for safely firing forward through a spinning propeller—the non-synchronizable, open bolt-firing cycle Lewis gun was still slightly heavier than the Marlin, at about 28 pounds (12.7 kg). By the last months of World War I, almost 50% of the SPAD XIII fighter aircraft used by the United States Army Air Service in France had their Vickers guns replaced with Marlins. Had the war lasted into 1919, the Marlin would have been the primary U.S. tank and aircraft gun. The M1917/1918 also equipped Thomas Morse Scout aircraft used for advanced training at stateside bases.

A number of Colt and Marlin-made machine guns was also provided to Italian forces during World War I to replace similar weapons lost in the retreat that followed the massive Austrian-German breakthrough at the Battle of Caporetto. Besides being chambered for the standard 6.5×52mm Mannlicher–Carcano Italian rifle cartridge, they were converted to liquid cooling with the installation of a narrow brass sleeve around the barrel; M1895/14 machine guns receiving this modification were designated "6.5/80" and employed by the Regia Marina (Royal Italian Navy) as a field weapon for Marine infantrymen defending the mouth of the Piave river. They also appeared on Navy vessels, with as many as four equipping each Italian MAS (torpedo boat), on "Class F" submarines and on some destroyers. The MAS used by Gabriele D'Annunzio in the famous Beffa di Buccari and displayed at his former residence (Vittoriale degli Italiani) still mounts a Colt M1895.

The Marlin gun saw postwar use on the machine gun version of US Army's M1917 Tank, an American version of the French Renault FT. However, the Marlin guns quickly disappeared from U.S. military service after the great success of the .30 Browning machine guns and variants subsequently adopted for air, ground, and shipboard use, with the debut of the M1919 Browning machine gun air-cooled ordnance.

== Postwar service ==
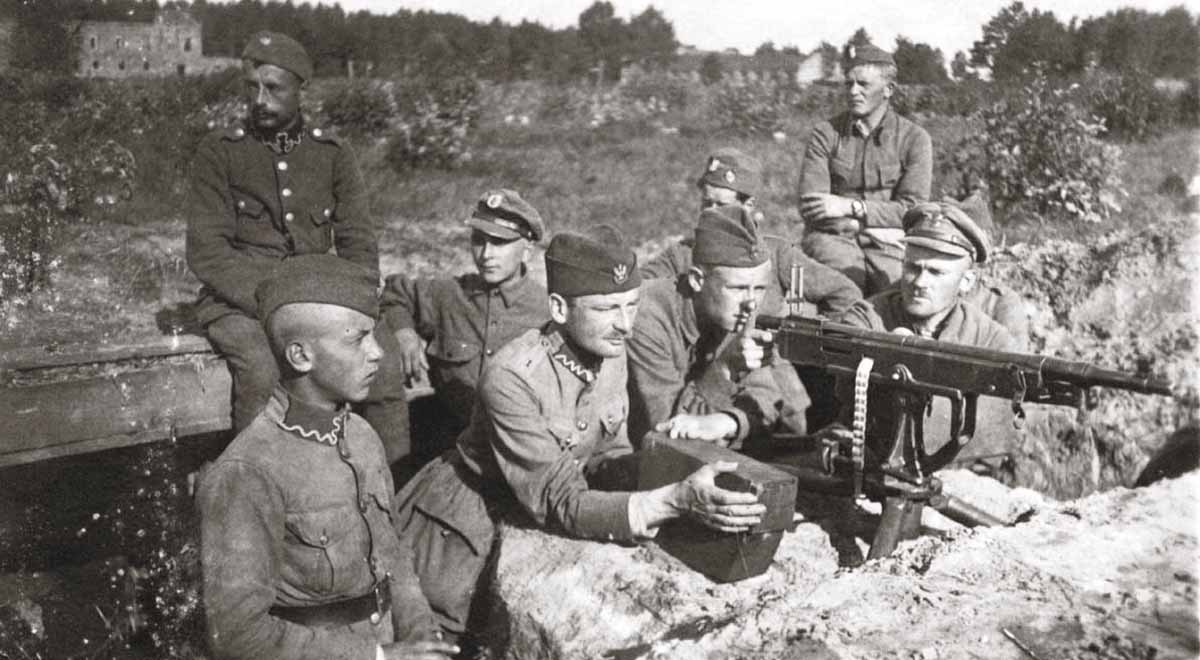
Polish soldiers with the M1895/14 during the Battle of Warsaw in 1920.

After World War I, some Colt–Browning guns (possibly including the M1917/18 Marlin variants) saw use in the Russian Civil war. Its most spectacular use came during the Czech Legion's exodus from Russia, where the guns (either Colt–Browning M1914 or Marlin M1917 models) were photographed in sandbagged stations on the top of trains being used to transport the Legion as it withdrew from Soviet Russia. Many of these guns were also used in the Polish–Soviet War of 1920. At the outset of World War II, M1917 and M1918 Marlins were also sent to Britain for use by the Home Guard, but were never used in combat.

The last documented use of the type was by the US National Guard against striking miners in the Battle of Blair Mountain, West Virginia, U.S., in 1921. A contemporary photo illustrates a Colt–Browning gun with one of the aforementioned finned aluminum heat-sink outfitted barrel from the Marlin-Rockwell firm, in the hands of a guardsman supporting sheriff's deputies. The presence of the breech-to-muzzle finned aluminum heat sink indicates the gun was most likely a Marlin-Rockwell M1917/18 machine gun purchased by the Army in 1917–18 for training and familiarization purposes, as the U.S. military never purchased the Colt M1895/1914 variant.

Due to their previous use in the Spanish Army the machine gun was used extensively on both sides of the Spanish Civil War. It was notably used to great effect at the Battle of Jarama by the British battalion however it often jammed and so was ill thought of by the troops.

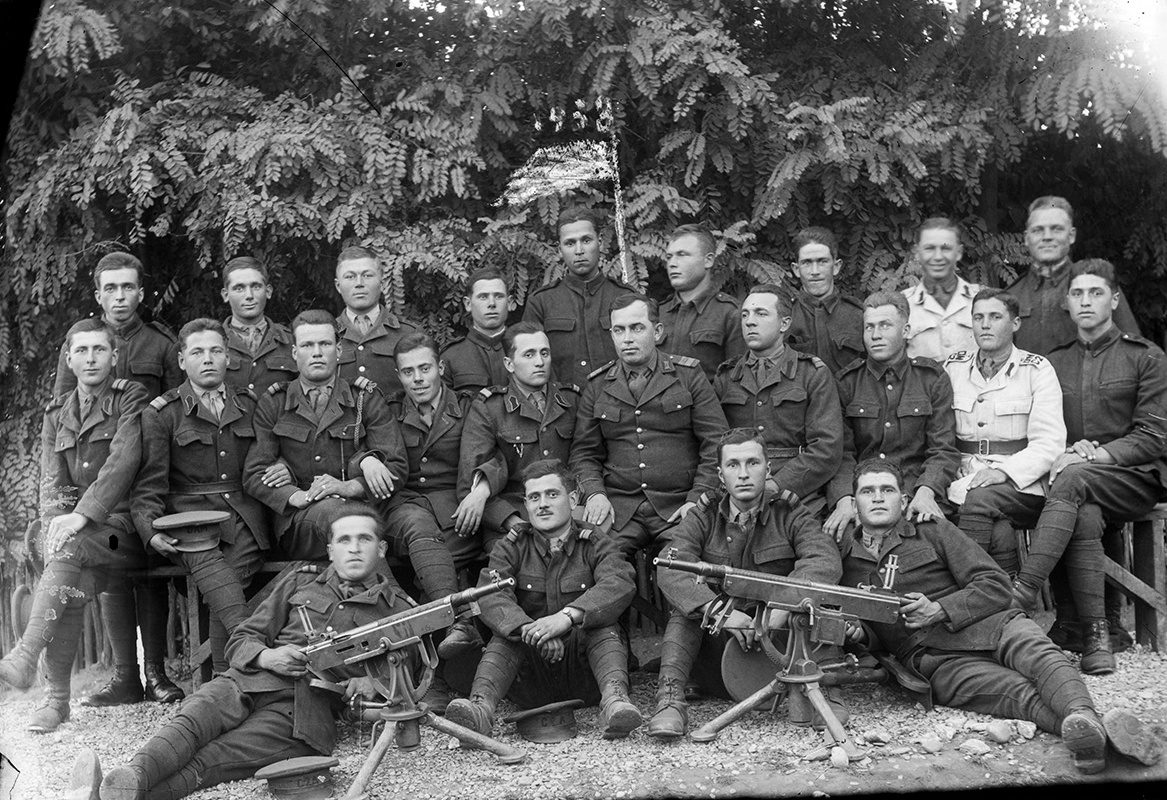
Romanian soldiers with two M1895 Colt–Browning machine guns. c. 1939

The Belgian army acquired a large number of 7mm Mauser M1895/14 versions towards the end of World War I, which were kept in storage after the conflict and allocated to certain reserve infantry regiments before the outbreak of World War II. The guns were widely used in action during the German invasion of Belgium between 10 May and 28 May 1940.

Colt–Browning guns placed in storage by the US military after the First World War were purchased for the British Home Guard in the summer of 1940. There were mostly later "Marlin" variants, and few appear to have reached troops.

Italy also kept M1895s in its inventory for a very long time. Well into the Second World War they were still being issued to second-line units, namely to MVSN branches such as DICAT (in charge of Flak guns) and MILMART (coastal artillery) for the anti-aircraft defense of Italy proper as late as 1943.

== Variants ==
- Colt–Browning M1895 — Original version.
- Colt–Browning M1895/14 — Commercial version of the original M1895, equipped with a detachable barrel with multiple radial fins. Also produced by Marlin.
- Marlin M1917 / Marlin M1918 — Tank and aircraft machine guns produced by Marlin. Different from the base design by the use of a linear gas piston, running in parallel to the barrel and below it, along with addition with an aluminum radiator. Most Marlin guns saw action as aircraft machine guns.

== Users ==
- Australia
- Belgium
- Bolivia
- Brazil – Two guns with wheeled carriages were bought by the Maranhão police in 1895 Used by police in the Federal District.
- Canada
- China – 27 were imported by Feng Yuxiang
- Spain
- Czechoslovakia
- Finland – Saw use with both sides during Finnish Civil War. Briefly used by Finnish Army in 1918–1919, then transferred to Finnish Civil Guard (Suojeluskunta). They remained in Civil Guard use until sold and exported in 1936.
- France
- Greece
- Honduras
- Italy – Designated the ''Mitragliatrice Colt Modello 1915 calibro 6.5''; it was first issued to the Regia Marina to equip torpedo and patrol boats. They were also used by the Brigata Marina San Marco. After the Battle of Caporetto, they were issued to front-line infantry units where they remained in service until the end of the war. There are photographs showing Colts still in service in the Second Italo-Ethiopian war (1935–1936) and the early days of WWII, usually in the anti-aircraft role.
- Mexico
- Philippines
- Poland
- Paraguay
- Romania
- Russian Empire – 14,850 M1895/1914s were purchased
- Uruguay
- United Kingdom
- United States
- Yemen

== Conflicts ==
19th century – 1920s
Spanish–American War
Philippine–American War
Chinese Boxer Rebellion
Central American–Caribbean-American Banana Wars
Second Boer War
Uruguayan Revolution (1904)
Mexican Revolution
- United States labor uprisings
  - Colorado Coalfield War (1913–1914)
  - Battle of Blair Mountain (1921)
- World War I (Note: Including the aftermath of World War I.)
  - Russian Revolution
  - Finnish Civil War
  - Polish–Soviet War
Warlord Era of China (limited use)
Second Honduran Civil War
1930s onward
Bolivia-Paraguay Chaco War
Second Italo-Ethiopian War
Spanish Civil War
World War II (limited use)
North Yemen Civil War

== See also ==
- Salvator-Dormus M1893
