= Christiaan Ernst Fourie =

South African military commander

Combat General (veggeneraal) Christiaan Ernst Fourie (1858-1943)
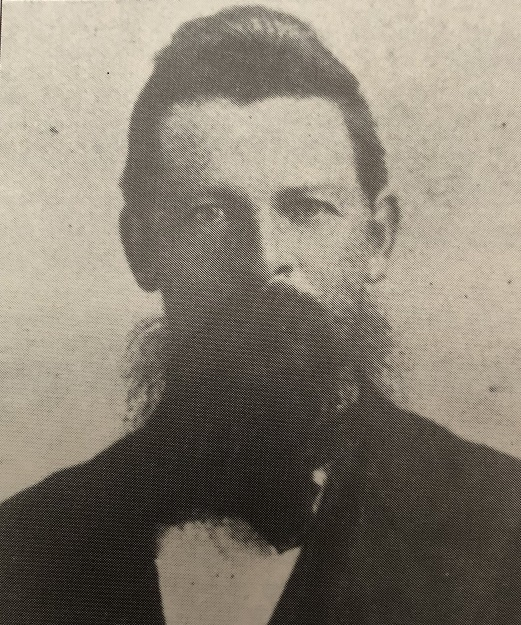

Personal details
- Born: 17 June 1858 Lydenburg (Mashishing), South African Republic
- Died: 15 August 1943 (aged 85) Pietersburg (now Polokwane, Limpopo), South Africa
- Occupation: commander, combat general (Afrikaans: veggeneraal)

Military service
- Allegiance: South African Republic
- Battles/wars: military campaigns against Sekhukhune (First Sekhukhune War, 1876), and Nyabela, 1885; Second Boer War (1899–1902); early battles, including the Battle of Dundee (20 October 1899), Modderspruit, several battles on the Tugela River, such as the Battle of Colenso (15 December 1899)

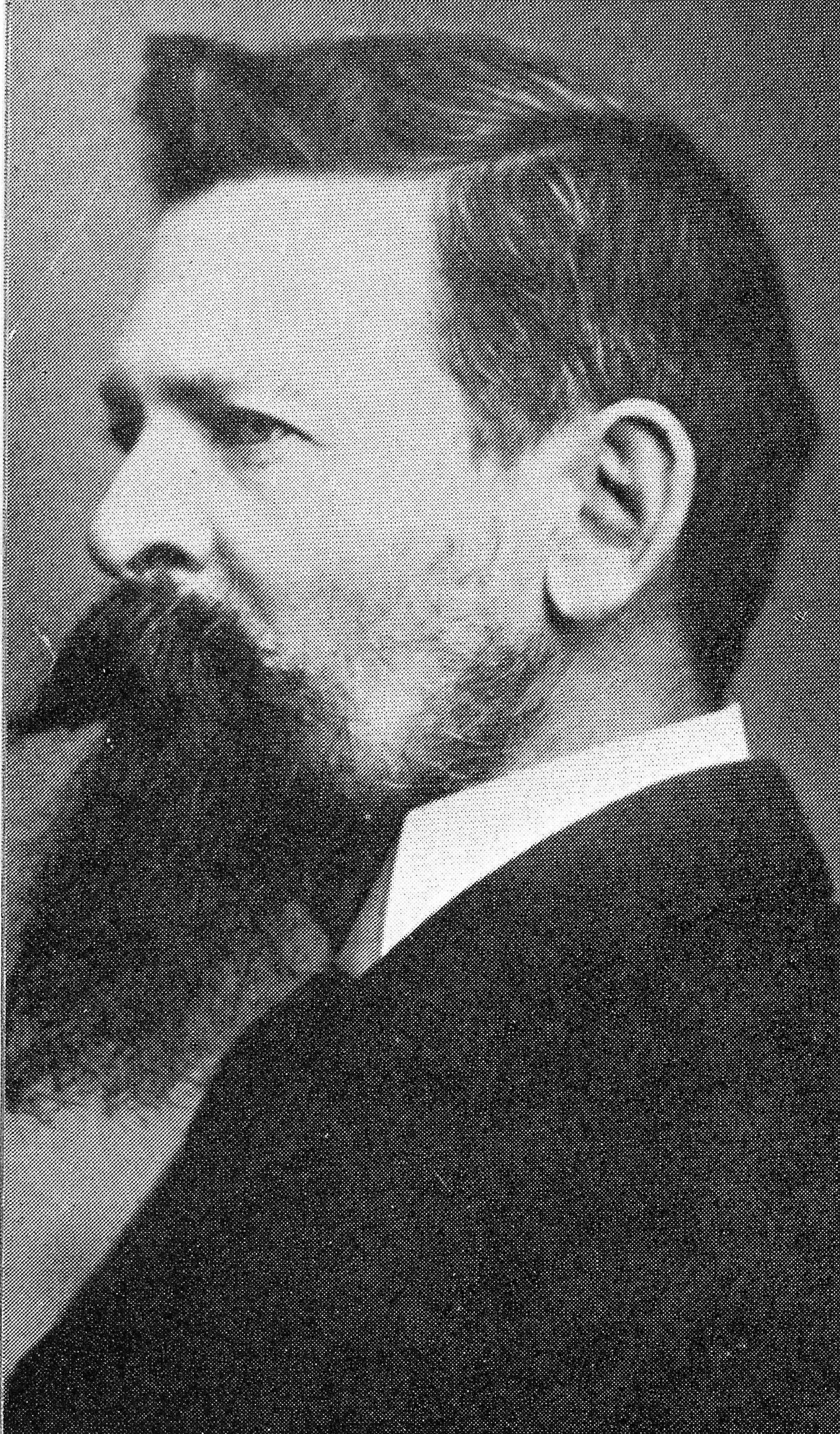
General Christiaan Ernst Fourie.

Christiaan "Chrisjan" Ernst Fourie (Lydenburg, 17 June 1858 – Pietersburg, 15 August 1943) was an Anglo-Boer War commander of the Middelburg and Johannesburg Commandos and later a combat general (Afrikaans: veggeneraal) for the South African Republic. He should not be confused with his colleagues, the Boer generals Joachim Christoffel Fourie (1845–1900) and Petrus "Piet" Johannes Fourie (1842–1916).

== Early years ==
Fourie participated in various military campaigns such as the First Sekhukhune War against the Pedi people in 1876 and Nyabêla in 1885. He moved to Blesbokfontein in the Middelburg district in 1888. Fourie was sent by the government with a committee on an adventurous trip to Mashonaland in 1890. He was elected Field cornet for the Olifantsrivier section of his district in 1896 and promoted to commander in 1897. That same year he was made Natives Commissioner (Afrikaans: Naturellen kommissaris) as well.

== Second Boer War 1899 – 1902 ==
In the first months of the Anglo-Boer War Fourie fought several battles and was raised to the rank of Combat General (Afrikaans: veggeneraal) on 13 December 1899 by the interim Kommandant-Generaal of the South African Republic. Boer general Ben Viljoen complained about the contradictory orders at the Battle of Colenso of 15 December 1900, where "a certain Mr. C. Fourie ...also played general". Historian Breytenbach concurs with Viljoen that Fourie's orders were counterproductive, and concludes that the Boers' victory could have been greater by executing Louis Botha's original plan to outflank the British with more British troops captured. After the relief of Ladysmith Fourie went to Orange Free State to reinforce the Heidelberg Commando there.

Later he was sent to the Highveld to help with artillery and the appeasement of the Pedi people. Fourie succeeded in providing the commandos with salt and maize, but was captured by the British due to treason in March 1900. He however managed to escape from his prison in Middelburg in June 1900, and continued fighting the British to the end of the war. In old age, he led the horse commando on a parade in Middelburg during the centennial commemoration of the Great Trek in 1938. Fourie died on 15 August 1943 in Pietersburg (Polokwane).

== Literature ==
- A.E., Onze Krijgs-officieren. Album van portretten met levens-schetsen der Transvaalse Generaals en Kommandanten, Volksstem, Pretoria 1904, Pretoria, Volksstem, 1904. In Dutch with a preface by Louis Botha. PDF on Wikimedia Commons.
- Breytenbach, J. H., Die Geskiedenis van die Tweede Vryheidsoorlog in Suid-Afrika, 1899–1902, Die Staatsdrukker Pretoria, 1969–1996. Six volumes in Afrikaans.
  - Breytenbach, J. H. (1971). Die eerste Britse offensief, Nov. - Des. 1899 [The first British offensive, Nov. - Dec. 1899]. Die Geskiedenis van die Tweede Vryheidsoorlog in Suid-Afrika, 1899-1902 (in Afrikaans). Vol. II. Pretoria: Die Staatsdrukker. Prelude to the Battle of Colenso : pages 240, 242, and 251. Battle of Colenso, 15 December 1899: page 332.
  - Breytenbach, J. H. (1973). Die stryd in Natal, Jan. - Feb. 1900 [The battle in Natal, Jan. - Feb. 1900]. Die Geskiedenis van die Tweede Vryheidsoorlog in Suid-Afrika, 1899-1902 (in Afrikaans). Vol. III. Pretoria: Die Staatsdrukker. ISBN 9780797012394. OCLC 612581136. Pages 3, 275, 338, 402, 407–410, 415–416, 419–420, 422, 424, 426, 429, 439, 442, 452, and 522 (armistice at Hart's Hill 25 February 1900, in the Battle of the Tugela Heights). Portrait: Photo 28.
- Viljoen, Benjamin Johannis, Mijne herinneringen uit den Anglo-Boeren-Oorlog, Amsterdam: W. Versluys, 1902. In Dutch. English version: General Ben Viljoen: My Reminiscences of the Anglo-Boer War. Maps from Drawings by P. Van Breda, London: Hood, Douglas, & Howard, 11, Clifford's Inn, E.C. 1902. Viljoen, Ben (1902). "My Reminiscences of the Anglo-Boer War". gutenberg.org. Project Gutenberg Literary Archive Foundation.
