= Battle of Leliefontein =

1900 battle of the Second Boer War

- Part of Second Boer War
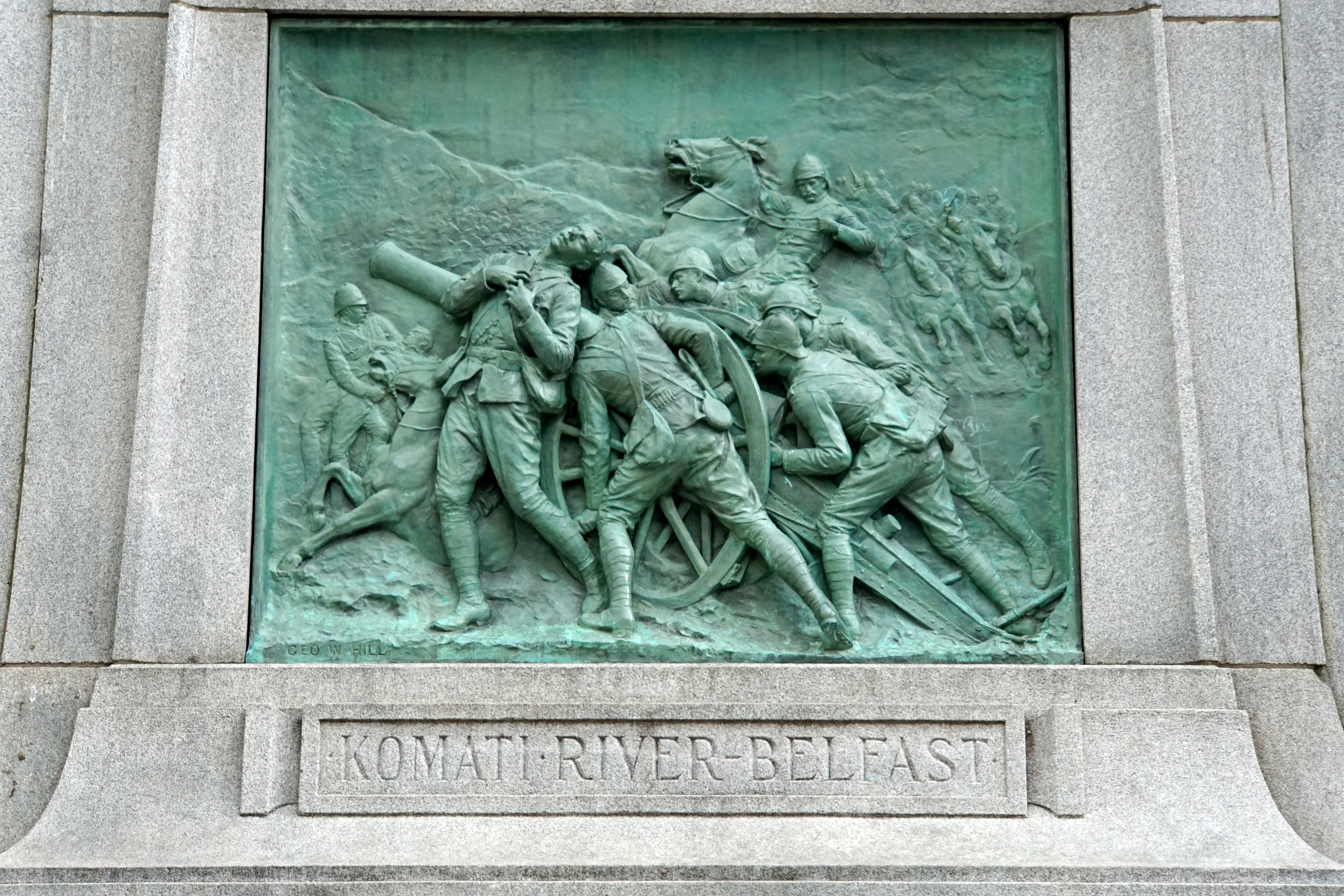
- Depiction of the Battle of Leliefontein on the Boer War Memorial in Montreal
Date	7 November 1900
Location	Lelifontein, Transvaal 25°58′0″S 30°3′0″E
Result	Anglo-Canadian victory: See aftermath

Belligerents
United Kingdom; Canada	South African Republic

Commanders and leaders
(United Kingdom) Horace Smith-Dorrien (Canada) François Lessard	(South African Republic) Joachim Fourie † (South African Republic) Johann Grobler (WIA) (South African Republic) Hendrik Frederik Prinsloo †

Strength
90–100 men (Note: The following figure refers to those engaged in rearguard actions at Leliefontein and does not include the larger British-Canadian force that was withdrawing from the area.)	Unknown

Casualties and losses
3 killed 11 wounded	Unknown

The Battle of Leliefontein (also known as the Battle of Witkloof) was an engagement between British-Canadian and Boer forces during the Second Boer War on 7 November 1900, at the Komati River 30 kilometres (19 mi) south of Belfast at the present day Nooitgedacht Dam.

During the engagement, the Canadian rearguard successfully repelled Boer assaults against the column, facilitating the successful withdrawal of the British-Canadian force from the area. Three members of the Royal Canadian Dragoons were awarded the Victoria Cross for their actions during the battle.

== Background ==
In November 1900, a British force advanced from Belfast towards the Komati River to push the Boer soldiers out of the area. The British force also included the second Canadian contingent to arrive in South Africa, including members of the Royal Canadian Dragoons, the 2nd Canadian Mounted Rifles and "D" Battery of the Canadian Field Artillery.

Led by Major-General Horace Smith-Dorrien, the force arrived at the river on 6 November and drove the Boers from their positions. However, as resistance was stronger than expected, and because Smith-Dorrien had expected the Boers to be reinforced, he ordered his forces to set up camp at Leliefontein for the night, before beginning a withdrawal back to Belfast the following morning.

The Boers that withdrew from their positions in Komati later reconsolidated with reinforcements, having expected the British force to pursue them. The Boer force included the Ermelo Commando and Carolina Commando. The Boers originally planned to intercept an advancing British force at a road south of the river. However, after the Boers realized that the British-Canadian force was not pursuing them and was withdrawing from the area, they advanced to attack the rear of the British-Canadian column.

== Battle ==
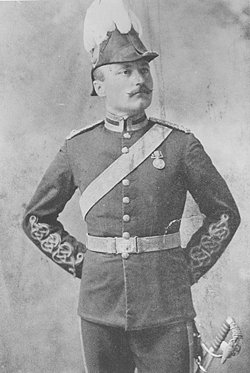
Lieutenant-Colonel François-Louis Lessard of the Royal Canadian Dragoons, 1900. Lessard was tasked with covering the withdrawal of the British-Canadian force.

A force led by Lieutenant-Colonel François-Louis Lessard, which included 90–100 men from the Royal Canadian Dragoons, two 12-pounder field guns from "D" Battery of the Canadian Field Artillery, and a horse-drawn M1895 Colt-Browning machine gun, was tasked with covering the larger force's withdrawal as its rearguard. The dragoons were deployed in a 4-to-5-kilometre-wide (2.5 to 3.1 mi) line behind the withdrawing British column, with the horse-drawn machine gun at its centre.

Throughout the morning, Boer forces assaulted the Canadian rearguard positions. At one point during the engagement, 200 mounted Boers charged the Canadian's positions in an attempt to break their line. A handful of Royal Canadian Dragoons repulsed the mounted charge, with assistance from the left section of D Battery under the command of Lieutenant Edward Morrison. The mounted charge almost captured a field gun, but a hastily organized ambush conducted by 12 men led by Lieutenant Richard Turner prevented the field gun's capture. Although Morrison was injured, the dragoons, assisted by the machine gun on their left flank, repelled the Boer assault.

Boers then assaulted the position where the horse-drawn machine gun carriage was placed and eventually captured the position. However, Sergeant Edward Holland took the machine gun off its carriage and carried it away to prevent its capture, burning his hand on the gun's barrel in the process. During this fighting, machine gun fire killed two of the local Boer commanders, General Joachim Christoffel Fourie, and Kommandant Hendrik Frederik Prinsloo. Boer General Johann Grobler was also wounded during the engagement.

Dragoons under Lieutenant Hampden Cockburn defended their positions until the rest of the rearguard withdrew further behind them. However, as a result of the action, the dragoons under Holland's command were all captured, killed, or wounded; with Holland being captured and also sustaining injuries. Boer assaults on the Canadian positions persisted, although lacking the organization and momentum of earlier assaults due to the loss of the commanders. The two 12-pound field guns were used to fight a rearguard action until the Canadian soldiers reached the high ground, after which the Boers halted their attack.

== Orders of Battle ==
Anglo-Canadian order of battle	Boer order of battle
Flying Column, Belfast Garrison (Commanding Officer: Major General Horace Smith-Dorrien)	Boer Forces (Overall Commander: Assistant-General Joachim Christoffel Fourie) †
British Forces: D Squadron, 5th Royal Irish Lancers [100 officers and men]; Eight companies, 2nd Battalion, The King's Shropshire Light Infantry [600 officers and men] (Commanding Officer: Lieutenant Colonel James Spens); 84th Battery, Royal Field Artillery (Officer Commanding: Major Guiness); 4 x 15-pdr. guns; S Section, Vickers-Maxims, RFA; 2 x 1-pdr. pom-poms; Section, 14 Company, Southern Division, Royal Garrison Artillery; 2 x 5-inch guns; X Division Ammunition Column, Royal Artillery; Section, Royal Engineers; Detachment, 43 Company, Army Service Corps; 19 Brigade Bearer Company, RAMC; Canadian Forces: Composite Squadron, The Royal Canadian Dragoons (Special Service Force) [90 officers and men] (Commanding Officer: Lieutenant Colonel François-Louis Lessard); Regimental Scouts (Section Commander: Sergeant Robert Ryan); No. 1 Troop, A Squadron (Officer Commanding: Lieutenant Francis Sutton); No. 2 Troop, A Squadron (Officer Commanding: Lieutenant Hampden Cockburn) (WIA) (POW); No. 2 Troop, B Squadron (Officer Commanding: Lieutenant Richard Turner) (WIA); Machine Gun Section (Section Commander: Sergeant Edward Holland); 1 x .303 Colt Machine Gun; Composite Squadron, 1st Canadian Mounted Rifles (Commanding Officer: Lieutenant Colonel Thomas D. B. Evans); No. 2 Troop, A Squadron (Officer Commanding: Lieutenant J.V. Begin); No. 3 Troop, A Squadron (Officer Commanding: Lieutenant T.A. Wroughton); No. 2 Troop, B Squadron (Troop Sergeant: Sergeant C.R. Tryon); Left Section, D Battery, Royal Canadian Field Artillery (Officer Commanding: Lieutenant Edward W.B. Morrison); 2 x 12-pdr. guns	Boer Commandos: Carolina Commando [est. 300 men] (Commander: Commandant Hendrik Frederik Prinsloo) †; Ermelo Commando [est. 100 men] (Commander: Commandant Johannes Nicolaas Hendrik Grobler) (WIA); Middelburg Commando [est. 100 men] (Commander: Commandant Louis Steyn)

== Aftermath ==
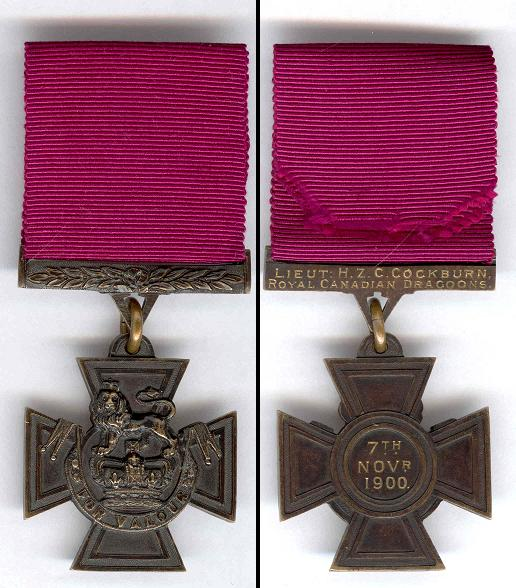
Lieutenant Hampden Cockburn's Victoria Cross. Cockburn was one of three Royal Canadian Dragoons awarded the Victoria Cross for their actions at Leliefontein.

After the battle, Smith-Dorrien wrote a letter to the British Chief of Staff, commending the successful rearguard action by the Royal Canadian Dragoons as well as Lessard's leadership.

I have much pleasure in forwarding attached statements on the gallant behaviour of officers and non-commissioned officers of The Royal Canadian Forces in the actions of 7th November 1900 between Witkloof and Leliefontein on the Koomati River. I must in bringing them forward emphasize the fact that the behaviour of the whole Royal Canadian rear guard under Lieutenant-Colonel Lessard was so fine that it makes it most difficult to single out for special distinction. There is no doubt that men sacrificed themselves in the most gallant way to save the guns which they succeeded in doing.

— Major-General Horace Smith-Dorrien

In addition to commending Lessard, Smith-Dorrien also recommended to the Chief of Staff awarding the Victoria Cross to four members of the Royal Canadian Dragoons, and another military decoration to Lieutenant Morrison.

=== Awards ===
Three members of the Royal Canadian Dragoons, including Sergeant Holland, Lieutenant Turner, and Lieutenant Cockburn were awarded the Victoria Cross for their actions at Leliefontein. The Royal Canadian Dragoons remains the only Canadian unit where three of its members were awarded the Victoria Cross in a single day. Private W. A. Knisley of the Royal Canadian Dragoons was also recommended for a Victoria Cross by Smith-Dorrien, although Knisley was not awarded the decoration. Lieutenant Morrison was awarded the Distinguished Service Order for his actions during the engagement.

== Legacy ==
Every year in early-November, the Royal Canadian Dragoons commerate Leliefontein Day in honour of the anniversary of the battle and of the RCD's role and achievements in it.

The two field guns that were involved in the battle are presently held by the Canadian War Museum.
