= François-Louis Lessard =

Canadian Army officer

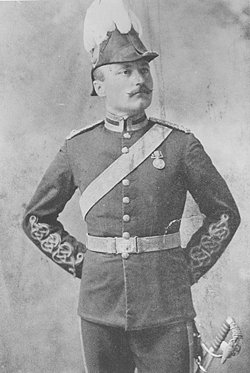
- Born: December 9, 1860; Quebec City, Canada East
- Died: August 7, 1927 (aged 66); Meadowvale, Mississauga, Ontario
- Burial place: Mount Hope Catholic Cemetery, Section 20
- Military career
- Allegiance: Canada
- Branch: Canadian Militia
- Service years: 1878–1919
- Rank: Major General
- Commands: Military District No. 6 Military District No. 2 Royal Canadian Dragoons; 1st Battalion, Canadian Mounted Rifles
- Conflicts: North-West Rebellion; Second Boer War; Battle of Leliefontein; World War I
- Awards: Companion of the Order of the Bath

Major General François-Louis Lessard, CB (December 9, 1860 – August 7, 1927) was a Canadian Army officer, most known for his service during the Second Boer War.

== Early life and education ==
Born in Quebec City, the son of Louis-Napoléon Lessard and Jane Felicity McCutcheon, Lessard was educated at the Collège Saint-Thomas in Montmagny and the Académie Commerciale de Québec.

== Military career ==
In 1880, he entered the Quebec Garrison Artillery as a second lieutenant. In 1884, he transferred to the 65th Battalion, Mount Royal Rifles before later joining the Permanent Force with the Cavalry School Corps (now Royal Canadian Dragoons). In 1885, he would see active service during the North-West Rebellion, although he did not see direct combat; as his cavalry unit was kept on lines of communication duties and guarding supply lines. He was promoted to captain in 1888 and major in 1894. In 1896, he was made Inspector of Cavalry for the Dominion of Canada. In 1898, he was promoted to lieutenant colonel and placed in command of the Royal Canadian Dragoons. He took part in the Second Boer War and was later made a Companion of the Order of the Bath by King Edward VII in recognition of his services.

Lessard returned to Canada in 1901 and was appointed Adjutant-General of the Canadian Militia in 1907. He was promoted to colonel in 1907, brigadier general in 1911, and major general in 1912. He was a director of the Canadian National Exhibition.

During the First World War, Lessard was passed over for frontline command because he clashed with Sir Sam Hughes, the Minister of Militia. He spent most of the war in Canada, including touring Quebec for recruits. In 1918, he suppressed the Quebec City conscription riots, killing four civilians.

== Final years ==
He retired in 1919 and settled in Meadowvale, Ontario, where he died of stomach cancer in 1927. A Roman Catholic, he was buried in Mount Hope Catholic Cemetery in Toronto.
