= Joachim Christoffel Fourie =

Anglo-Boer War general (1845–1900)

Joachim Christoffel Fourie (1845-1900)
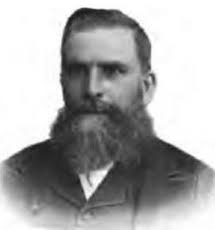

Personal details
- Born: 1 February 1845 Grahamstown, Cape Colony
- Died: 7 November 1900 (aged 55) Witkloof Farm, Carolina, South Africa. Killed in action in the Second Boer War.
- Occupation: farmer, field cornet, combat general (Afrikaans: veggeneraal) and Assistant Commander-in-chief (Assistent Kommandant Generaal)

Military service
- Allegiance: South African Republic
- Battles/wars: First Boer War (1880–1881); Military campaigns against South African Natives; Second Boer War (1899–1902)

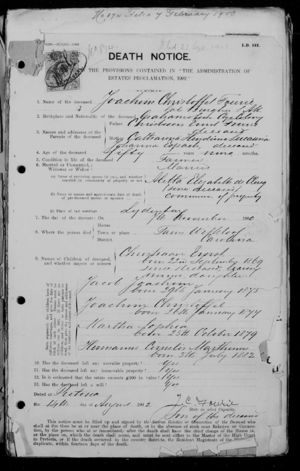
Death certificate ("notice") for Joachim Christoffel Fourie signed by (a different) J.C. Fourie.

Joachim Christoffel Fourie (1 February 1845 – 7 November 1900) was an Anglo-Boer War Combat General (Afrikaans: Veggeneraal) and Assistant Commander-in-Chief (Assistent Kommandant Generaal) for the South African Republic. He should not be confused with his colleagues, the Second Boer War generals Christiaan Ernst Fourie (1858-1943) and Petrus "Piet" Johannes Fourie (1842-1916), and his son and namesake Joachim Christoffel Fourie (1877-1958), military commander of the Carolina Commando in the South West Africa campaign (1914-1915) in the First World War.

== Early life ==
Fourie was born as one of the eight children of Christiaan Ernst Fourie (Grahamstown, South Africa, 14 June 1815 – Blauwkop District, Ermelo, South Africa, 11 March 1897) and Catharina Hendriena Lucasina Espach (Plaas (Farm) Goedehoop, Grahamstown, 12 February 1820 – Plaas Valharts, Ermelo, 24 August 1886). The Fourie family are the descendants of Huguenot immigrants to South Africa. Joachim Fourie grew up in Lydenburg, married Aletta Elizabeth de Clercq (Transvaal, 20 June 1849 – Carolina, 5 July 1902) and had four sons and one daughter by her. He fought as a field cornet for Lydenburg in the First Boer War (1880-1881) and various Native wars afterwards. Fourie represented the district of Lydenburg in the Volksraad of the South African Republic in 1893–1894.

== Second Boer War (1899–1902) ==
At the outbreak of the Second Boer War in October 1899 Fourie joined the Boer forces at the Natal front as a private citizen (Afrikaans: burgher). He distinguished himself and although he then lacked a military rank was elected in March 1900 Assistant General (Vechtgeneraal). In May 1900 Louis Botha promoted him to assistant commander-in-chief for the South African Republic. Fourie replaced Schalk Burger and led the Commandos from the districts of Carolina, Lydenburg, Heidelberg (including Boksburg), Standerton and Soutpansberg but could not stem the northward advance of British general Redvers Buller and his troops. Fourie fought several battles, including at Modderspruit (Afrikaans: Slag van die Twee Riviere (Battle of the two rivers), 28 November 1899), Spion Kop (Spioenkop, 23–24 January 1900), and Witrand - Dalmanutha (Bergendal, 21–27 August 1900). On 7 November 1900 he was killed in action at Witkloof Farm, Carolina, in the Battle of Leliefontein near his house and was buried there the next day at Welgevonden Farm.

== Literature ==
- A.E., Onze Krijgs-officieren. Album van portretten met levens-schetsen der Transvaalse Generaals en Kommandanten, Volksstem, Pretoria 1904, Pretoria, Volksstem, 1904. In Dutch with a preface by Louis Botha. PDF on Wikimedia Commons.
- Breytenbach, J. H., Die Geskiedenis van die Tweede Vryheidsoorlog in Suid-Afrika, 1899–1902, Die Staatsdrukker Pretoria, 1969–1996. Six volumes in Afrikaans.
  - Breytenbach, J. H. (1996). Die beleg van Mafeking tot met die Slag van Bergendal [The siege of Mafeking up to the Battle of Bergendal]. Die Geskiedenis van die Tweede Vryheidsoorlog in Suid-Afrika, 1899-1902 (in Afrikaans). Vol. VI. Pretoria: Die Staatsdrukker. ISBN 9780797033214. OCLC 813492747. Pages 64, 81, 83–84, 89, 102, 115, 123, 131, 135–136, 141–142, 144, 154–156, 159, 165, 176, 182, 184, 188, 198, 243, 269, 295, 302, 320, and 331.
- Brits JP (1977). "Fourie, Joachim Christoffel". In Krüger DW, Beyers CJ (eds.). Dictionary of South African Biography Vol III (1st ed.). Cape Town: Tafelberg-Uitgewers. pp. 305–306. ISBN 0624008495. OCLC 1063845175.
