= Piet Fourie =

General Petrus Johannes Fourie

Personal details
- Born: 20 June 1842
- Died: 23 May 1916 (aged 73) Perzikenfontein, Bloemfontein, Free State, South Africa
- Occupation: farmer, commander, combat general (Afrikaans: veggeneraal)
- Nickname: Piet

Military service
- Allegiance: Orange Free State
- Battles/wars: Free State–Basotho Wars; Second Boer War (1899–1902); all major early battles, including; - the Battle of Graspan (25 November 1900), - Battle of Modder River (Afrikaans: Slag van die Twee Riviere) (28 November 1900) and; - the Battle of Magersfontein (11 December 1899); Battle of Sanna's Post (Afrikaans: Sannaspos) (31 March 1900).; Battle of Sand River (Afrikaans: Sandrivier) (10 May 1900).; Battle of Rooiwal Station (7 June 1900) between Kroonstad and Vereeniging).

Petrus "Piet" Johannes Fourie (20 June 1842 – 23 May 1916 (aged 73)) was a Boer general for the Orange Free State in the Anglo-Boer War (1899–1902) in South Africa. He should not be confused with his Boer colleagues generals Joachim Christoffel Fourie (1845–1900) and Christiaan Ernst Fourie (1858–1943).

== Family ==
Fourie was the eldest son of Louis Jacobus Fourie (Uitenhage, Port Elizabeth, Eastern Cape, South Africa, 27 January 1814 – Vet River, Winburg, 28 June 1856) and Maria Magdalena (Magdalina) Pieterse(n) (3 September 1815 – Rustfontein, Bloemfontein, Free State, South Africa, 2 July 1868), among in total two daughters and two sons. He married Maria Magdalena van Tonder (Ladismith, Western Cape, 17 March 1850 – Dewetsdorp, Free State, 16 April 1940), and had four sons and one daughter by her.

== Early years ==
Fourie was born in the Cape Colony but moved at a young age to the Orange Free State. He fought in the Free State–Basotho Wars and had a prosperous farm near Bloemfontein, where he was a justice of the peace.

== Second Boer War ==
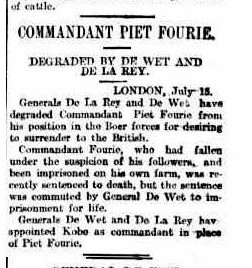
"Commandant Piet Fourie. Degraded by De Wet and De la Rey", Newspaper The Argus, Melbourne, July 15, 1901. Fourie was stripped of his rank because of his desire to surrender to the British.

After the outbreak of the war in October 1899 Fourie became the commander of the Bloemfontein Commando and fought all the major battles at the western front. After the capture of Bloemfontein by the British on 13 March 1900 Fourie participated in the Boer victory at Sanna's Post (31 March 1900), the failed attack on British positions at Jammersberg Drift (9 April 1900), the failure to stop the British advance in the Battle of Sand River southwest of Kroonstad (10 May 1900), and again a victory at Rooiwal (Roodewal) Station (7 June 1900), under the overall command of Christiaan de Wet.

To retaliate and to deter further Boer resistance British Commander-in-Chief Roberts dynamited De Wet's farm Roodepoort on 16 June. Afterwards Fourie visited the site with general Stoffel Froneman and De Wet himself. At the end of July, Fourie escaped from the Brandwater Basin with 1500 men, where Marthinus Prinsloo surrendered soon after on 30 July with more than 4000 remaining Boer troops. In August 1900 Fourie was promoted to Assistant Chief Commander for the districts of Bloemfontein, Smithfield, Rouxville and Wepener. In December 1900 he broke the British line of blockhouses at Sprinkaansnek.

In February 1901 De Wet sent his generals Froneman and Fourie with many troops east of the Cape Town-Bloemfontein railway line to mislead the British. De Wet and his smaller unit crossed the Orange River at Sand Drift, 60 kilometres west of the railway and marched into the Cape Colony.

In July 1901 De Wet and general De la Rey stripped Fourie of his rank because of his stated desire to surrender to the British. Subsequently, he was imprisoned on his own farm. However, he changed heart later, was pardoned and joined Christiaan de Wet's troops again, but no more as a general.

== Bibliography ==
- Bossenbroek, M.P. (2018). The Boer War. Translated by Rosenberg, Yvette. New York, NY: Seven Stories Press. pp. 273, 285, and 321–322. ISBN 9781609807474.
- Breytenbach, J.H. (1978). Die Boere-offensief : Okt.-Nov. 1899 [The Boer Offensive: Oct.-Nov. 1899]. Die Geskiedenis van die Tweede Vryheidsoorlog in Suid-Afrika, 1899–1902 (in Afrikaans). Vol. I. Pretoria: Die Staatsdrukker.
- Breytenbach, J.H. (1969). Die eerste Britse offensief, Nov.- Des. 1899 [The first British Offensive, Nov.-Dec. 1899]. Die Geskiedenis van die Tweede Vryheidsoorlog in Suid-Afrika, 1899–1902 (in Afrikaans). Vol. II. Pretoria: Die Staatsdrukker. pp. 40, 78, and 117.
- Breytenbach, J.H. (1978). Die stryd in Natal, jan.-feb. 1900 [The Battle in Natal, Jan.-Feb. 1900.]. Die Geskiedenis van die Tweede Vryheidsoorlog in Suid-Afrika, 1899–1902 (in Afrikaans). Vol. III. Pretoria: Die Staatsdrukker.
- Breytenbach, Johan Hendrik (1977). Die Boereterugtog uit Kaapland [The Boer retreat from (the) Cape Colony]. Die Geskiedenis van die Tweede Vryheidsoorlog in Suid-Afrika, 1899–1902 (in Afrikaans). Vol. IV. Pretoria: Die Staatsdrukker. pp. 179, 465, and 471. ISBN 9780621040241.
- Breytenbach, Johan Hendrik (1983). Die Britse Opmars tot in Pretoria [The British advance up to Pretoria]. Die Geskiedenis van die Tweede Vryheidsoorlog in Suid-Afrika, 1899–1902 (in Afrikaans). Vol. V. Pretoria: Die Staatsdrukker. pp. 116, 192, 195, 206, 226–227, 236, 279–280, 310, 398, and 466. ISBN 9780621083606.
- Brits JP (1977). "Fourie, Petrus Johannes". In Krüger DW, Beyers CJ (eds.). Dictionary of South African Biography Vol III (1st ed.). Cape Town: Tafelberg-Uitgewers. pp. 306–307. ISBN 0624008495. OCLC 1063845175.
- Grobler, J. E. H. (2004). The War Reporter: the Anglo-Boer war through the eyes of the burghers. Johannesburg: Jonathan Ball Publishers. pp. 17, 41, 55, 61, 77, 86, 91, 96, 103, 107, 110–111, and 118. ISBN 978-1-86842-186-2.
