= Hampden Cockburn =

Recipient of the Victoria Cross

Major Hampden Cockburn VC
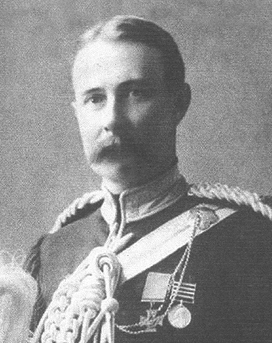
- Hampden Cockburn in uniform
- Born: Hampden Zane Churchill Cockburn; 19 November 1867; Toronto, Ontario, Canada
- Died: 12 July 1913 (aged 45); Maple Creek, Saskatchewan, Canada
- Burial place: St. James Cemetery (Hill A, Section S 1/2, Lot 11)
- Education: Upper Canada College
- Relatives: George Cockburn (father)
- Military career
- Allegiance: Dominion of Canada
- Branch: Canadian Militia
- Service years: 1891–1913
- Rank: Major
- Units: The Governor General's Body Guard; The Royal Canadian Dragoons
- Conflicts: Second Boer War: Battle of Leliefontein (WIA)
- Awards: Victoria Cross

Hampden Zane Churchill Cockburn (19 November 1867 – 12 July 1913) was a Canadian soldier who was awarded the Victoria Cross, the most prestigious award for gallantry in the face of the enemy that can be awarded to British and Commonwealth forces, for his actions during the Battle of Leliefontein during the Second Boer War.

== Early life ==
Born in Toronto, Ontario, Canada, Cockburn was a graduate of Upper Canada College in Toronto. On 20 November 1891, Cockburn joined the Canadian Militia and was commissioned as a Second Lieutenant with The Governor General's Body Guard.

== Second Boer War ==
When the Second Boer War broke out in 1899, Cockburn, then a 32-year-old lieutenant, volunteered for service in The Royal Canadian Dragoons, Canadian Militia, and was posted to South Africa with the regiment, where the action took place for which he was awarded the VC.

On 7 November 1900, during the Battle of Leliefontein near the Komati River, a large force of Boer commandos sought to encircle a retreating British column whose rearguard comprised two troops of Royal Canadian Dragoons and two 12-pounder guns of "D" Battery, Royal Canadian Field Artillery. Cockburn and Lieutenant Richard Turner commanded a small group of troopers who repulsed the Boers at close range, allowing the two field guns to escape capture. Sergeant Edward Holland of the Royal Canadian Dragoons, ably assisted them with good machine-gun work, finally fleeing in the face of superior Boer force with the machine gun under his arm to avoid its capture. All the men under Cockburn's command were either killed, wounded or captured. Cockburn was also wounded during the action.

Following the battle, three men of the Royal Canadian Dragoons were awarded the Victoria Cross: Cockburn, Turner and Holland.

The citations were published in the London Gazette of 23 April 1901. Cockburn's read:

Lieutenant Cockburn, with a handful of men, at a most critical moment held off the Boers to allow the guns to get away; to do so he had to sacrifice himself and his party, all of whom were killed, wounded, or taken prisoners, he himself being slightly wounded.

== Return to Canada ==
Following the Boer War, Cockburn returned to Canada, and eventually achieved the rank of major. He died in a horse-riding accident in Grayburn, Saskatchewan, in 1913, and was buried at St. James Cemetery, Toronto, Ontario, with a headstone at Hill A, Section S 1/2, Lot 11.

== Medal ==
Cockburn's Victoria Cross and sword were, for many years, displayed in the lobby of his alma mater, Upper Canada College. In 1977, the school had a high-quality copy made for display, and moved the original to safe-keeping.

== Gallery ==
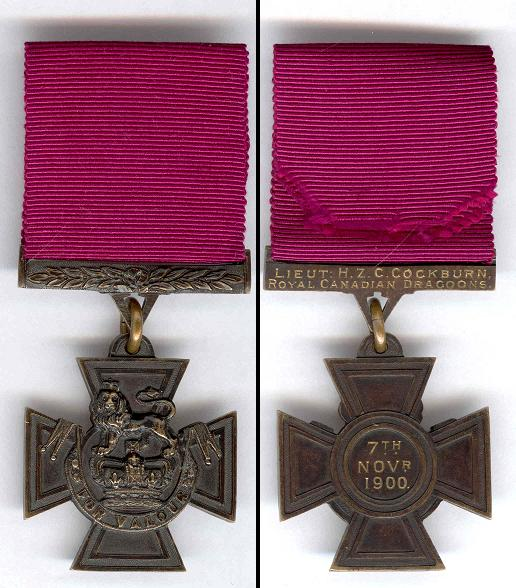
Obverse and reverse of Cockburn's Victoria Cross

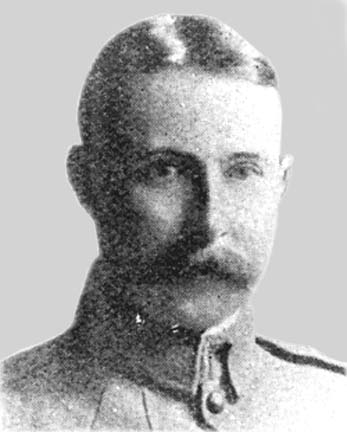
Cockburn as a lieutenant

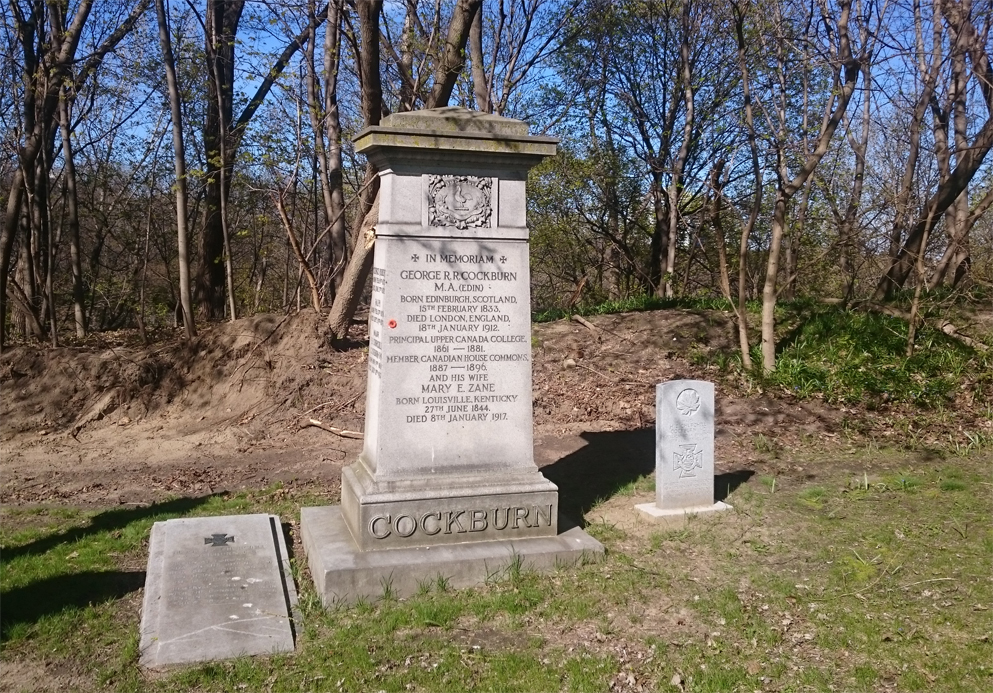
The grave site of Cockburn (and his parents) at St. James Cemetery, Toronto

== Sources ==
- Monuments to Courage (David Harvey, 1999)
- The Register of the Victoria Cross (This England, 1997)
- Victoria Crosses of the Anglo-Boer War (Ian Uys, 1981)
