= Edward Holland (Canadian Army officer) =

Recipient of the Victoria Cross (1878–1948)

Major Edward Holland VC
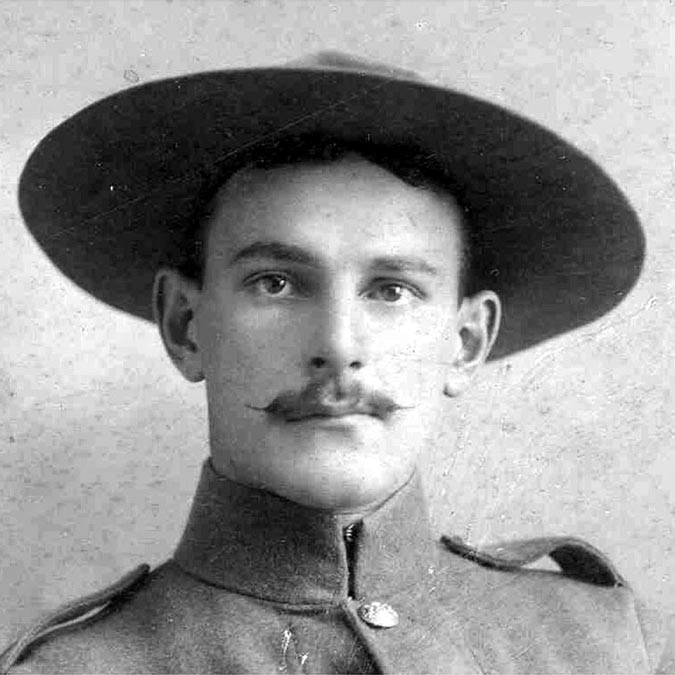
- A portrait of Edward Holland.
- Born: Edward James Gibson Holland; 2 February 1878; Ottawa, Ontario, Canada
- Died: 18 June 1948 (aged 70); Cobalt, Ontario, Canada
- Burial place: St James Cemetery (cremated)
- Education: Ottawa Collegiate Institute; Ottawa Model School
- Military career
- Allegiance: Dominion of Canada
- Branch: Canadian Militia: Canadian Expeditionary Force
- Rank: Major
- Units: The Royal Canadian Dragoons; Canadian Machine Gun Corps
- Conflicts: Second Boer War: Battle of Leliefontein; World War I: Western Front
- Awards: Victoria Cross

Edward James Gibson Holland (2 February 1878 – 18 June 1948) was a Canadian soldier who won the Victoria Cross, the most prestigious award for gallantry in the face of the enemy that can be awarded to British and Commonwealth forces, for his actions during the Battle of Leliefontein during the Second Boer War.

== Early life ==
Holland was born in Ottawa, Ontario, son of Andrew Holland and Mrs. (Gibson) Holland. He was educated at Ottawa Collegiate Institute (now called Lisgar Collegiate Institute) and at Ottawa Model School (Teachers College).

== Military career ==
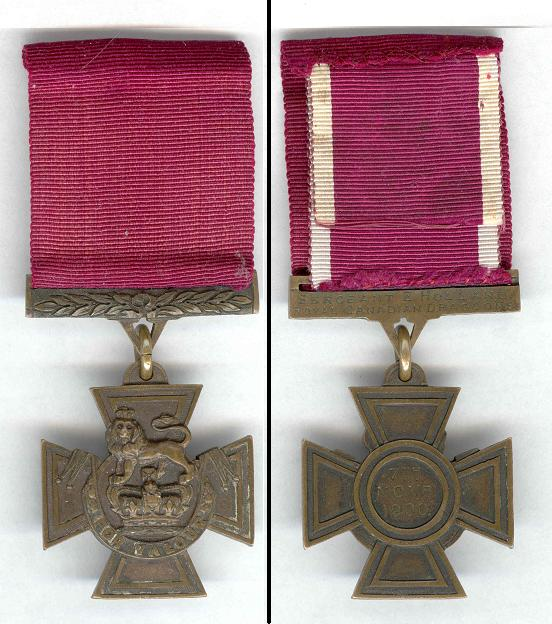
Obverse and reverse of Holland's VC

At the start of the Second Boer War, Holland, at 22 years of age, enlisted as a sergeant in The Royal Canadian Dragoons. He was one of three men from his regiment who were awarded the VC during a desperate rearguard action on 7 November 1900 at the Battle of Leliefontein near the Komati River. (The others were Lieutenant Hampden Cockburn and Lieutenant Richard Turner.)

During a dramatic retreat in the face of a superior force, Turner and Cockburn commanded a small group of men tasked with repulsing a large force of Boers at close range to prevent two 12-pound field guns from being captured. During the action, Holland helped to hold back the Boers using a Colt machine gun mounted on a carriage between the two guns. However, when the Colt machine gun overheated and jammed, Holland was unwilling to let it fall into the hands of the Boers. Realizing that the horse that pulled the machine gun carriage was too exhausted to outrun the Boers, Holland quickly detached the hot weapon from the carriage, caught and mounted a nearby horse and rode from the scene with the machine gun under his arm.

His citation for the Victoria Cross was published in The London Gazette of 23 April 1901:

Sergeant Holland did splendid work with his Colt gun, and kept the Boers off the two 12-pounders by its fire at close range. When he saw the enemy were too near for him to escape with the carriage, as the horse was blown, he calmly lifted the gun off and galloped away with it under his arm.

Following his return to Canada, Holland became a commissioned officer. During the visit to Canada of the Duke and Duchess of Cornwall and York, Holland received the Victoria Cross from the Duke of Cornwall and York (later King George V) in Ottawa on 21 September 1901.

Holland eventually achieved the rank of Major and served in World War I with the Canadian Machine Gun Corps. He commanded and actively recruited for the Borden's Machine Gun Battery in Cobalt, Ontario and the surrounding Temiskaming District.

From an article in New Liskeard Speaker, Friday, 15 January 1915 - Off to the Front

     Temiskaming friends of Major "Eddie" Holland will be interested in knowing that he is making all arrangements for the proper filling up of vacancies in the "Borden Armoured Light Battery", which will be sent to the front to aid the Allies just as quickly as all plans can be made.  Major Holland, who is a veteran of the Boer War, where he received the V.C. for gallant service, is in Temiskaming this week, where he is recruiting a number of men with whose ability to rough it he is already well acquainted.  Major Holland has come to the right quarter for the men he most desires to enlist.  No where but in a mining region; where the prospector and miner is hardened to the severest kind of work, could he secure men fit to take to the road in as short a space of time as can the chaps he is after, and we are sure he will find that the difficult part of his job will be to select the best men from the large numbers who will want to enlist under the command of the genial Major.    
   Speaking of the equipment over which the Major will have command, the Nugget says:    
   "Major Holland, V.C., will have seven armoured cars, one semi-armoured car, six motor-cycles, machine shop and ammunition and transport car in his equipment.  He has 60 men under his command and the majority of these men are all well known in Temiskaming, having been prospectors at various times in the north.  Four men and one officer are attached to each car".
    Following are the names of the men recruited by Major E.J. Holland for service in the Automobile Battery being and outfitted by Sir George Drummond and other Montreal gentlemen.  All the men named below are residents of New Ontario.
    Major E.J. Holland, Capt. B. McCarthy, Lieut. J.H. Rattery, Lieut. W. Patterson, Sergt.-Major E.H. Holland, I.H. Holland, F.B. Reece, W.H. Bruce, E.D. Carrier, H.W. Mauce, Reg. Moore, Sandy McIntyre, Doc Dowsley, Dave Moore, W. Mayor, T. Rogers, I.J.P. Morgan, J. Kennedy, Dan MacRae, D. Kipper, W. Maudley, Joe McDonald, Pete McDonald, O.J. Leeman, B.E. Sorpos, E. Moore, J. Oswald, F. Kennedy, Geo. Scott, M. Montgomery, J. Brennon, D. Saltrold, L. Coyne, Geo. M. Scott, A. Fraser, W. Taylor, A. Brady, A. McEcheram, J. Sullivan, A. Close, C. Ross.

== Later life ==
Holland died on 18 June 1948 in Cobalt, Ontario, a town at the south end of Lake Temiskaming and former centre of the silver-mining industry in Canada. He was cremated at St James's Crematorium, Toronto, Ontario, Canada. Ashes were scattered Island 17, Lake Temagami and at Prescott, Ontario, Canada (south of Ottawa, Ontario).

== Honours ==
- His Victoria Cross is currently stored as part of the Archives and Collection of the Royal Canadian Dragoons at CFB Petawawa.
- A plaque erected in 1969 at Trafalgar House on Argyle Street in Ottawa and dedicated to Holland relates the story of how he earned his VC.
- A brass plaque and print were erected in 1986 at his alma mater, Lisgar Collegiate Institute, by students and alumni in 1986 in remembrance of his bravery at Leliefontein.
- The Canadian Department of National Defence named an armoury in Ottawa the Major E.J.G. Holland VC Armoury. It is home to four local reserve units: 33 Signals Regiment, 33 Combat Engineer Regiment, 33 Service Battalion, and 33 Military Police Platoon.

== See also ==
- Monuments to Courage (David Harvey, 1999)
- The Register of the Victoria Cross (This England, 1997)
- Victoria Crosses of the Anglo-Boer War (Ian Uys, 2000)
- List of Canadian Victoria Cross recipients
