= Johan Hendrik Breytenbach =

South African historian

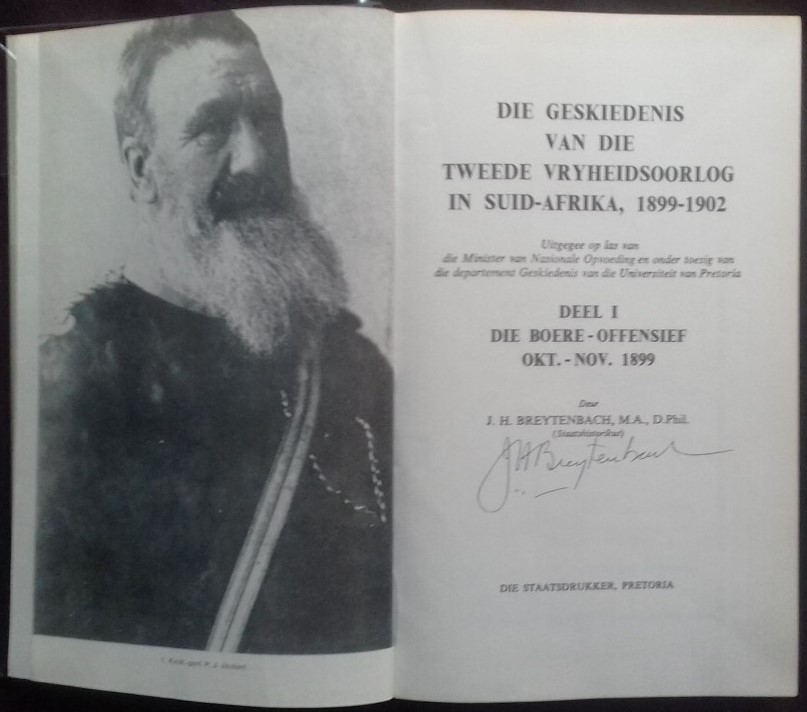
J. H. Breytenbach: Die Boere-offensief, Okt. – Nov. 1899 (1969). Frontispiece and title page of Volume I of Die Geskiedenis van die Tweede Vryheidsoorlog in Suid-Afrika, 1899–1902.

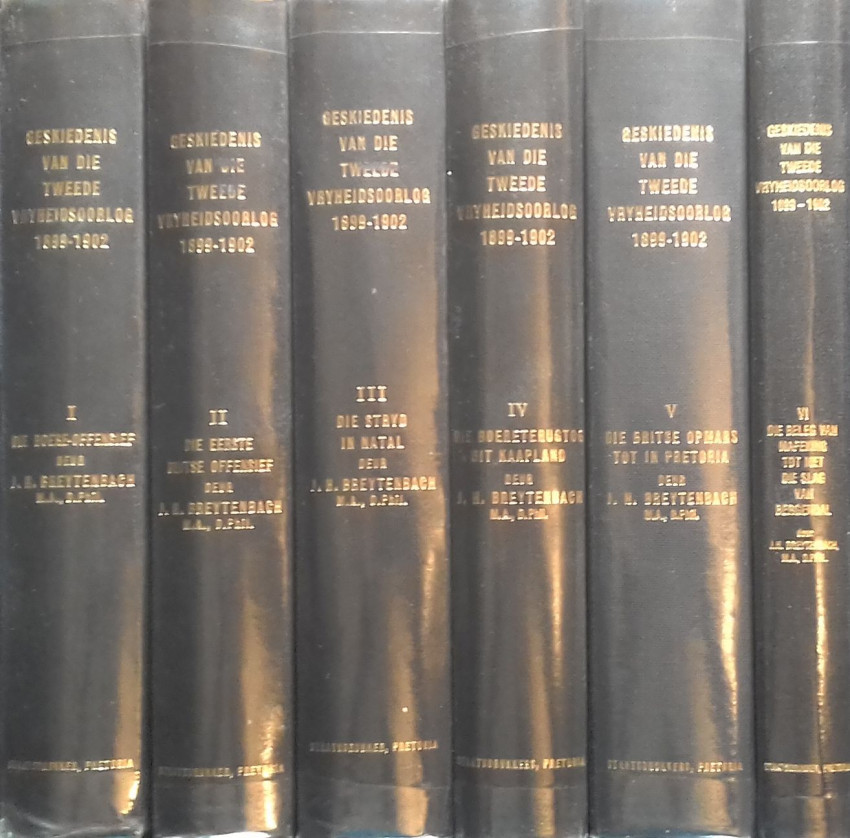
Book spines of J.H. Breytenbach: Die Geskiedenis van die Tweede Vryheidsoorlog in Suid-Afrika, 1899–1902, 1969–1996.

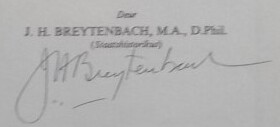
Signature of J.H. Breytenbach.

Johan Hendrik Breytenbach (1917 – 3 January 1994) was the official South African state historian for the Second Boer War. He was employed by the National Archives in Pretoria and studied the Second Boer War since 1940. In 1959 the Minister of Education, Arts and Science appointed Breytenbach state historian for the Second Boer War, supervised by the Department of History of the University of Pretoria. When Breytenbach died in 1994, he had published five volumes of his Die Geskiedenis van die Tweede Vryheidsoorlog in Suid-Afrika, 1899–1902 (in Afrikaans, translated title: The History of the Second War of Independence in South Africa, 1899–1902) between 1969 and 1983, with two further volumes at the planning stage. Using Breytenbach's notes, the State Archives finalised and published Volume 6 posthumously in 1996, concluding with a treatment of the Battle of Bergendal (21-27 August 1900). Apart from this major work Breytenbach published many books and articles on South African history.

== Quotes ==
Breytenbach on the reason to undertake Die Geskiedenis van die Tweede Vryheidsoorlog in Suid-Afrika, 1899–1902:

(Translation from Afrikaans) There are various reasons why the Government of the Republic of South Africa decided to have the history of the Second War of Independence described and published. Firstly, it is the largest and most glorious war ever fought in South Africa... Yet the history of the war in its entirety has never been scientifically described.... Secondly, the works fully treating the war all suffer from serious defects. In most, truth and fabrication are so mixed up due to the writers' sentiments that they fail to give a faithful picture of what really happened. Again, the few exceptions are all based on incomplete and hasty research... Furthermore, these works are not scientifically accounted for... The compiler of the present work has devoted himself since 1940 continuously to an in-depth study of the sources... Many of which are propaganda...

— Johan Hendrik Breytenbach, Die Geskiedenis van die Tweede Vryheidsoorlog in Suid-Afrika, 1899–1902. Deel I. Die Boere-offensief, Okt. – Nov. 1899. Voorwoord, page ix. In Afrikaans. (Translated title: The History of the Second War of Independence in South Africa, 1899–1902. The Boer Offensive, Oct. – Nov. 1899. Foreword.)

Breytenbach justified Boer general Piet Cronjé's controversial surrender to the British at the Battle of Paardeberg on 27 February 1900:

(Translation from Afrikaans) That general Piet Cronjé surrendered on Majuba Day was not his fault, and the small group of women and children in his encampment had nothing to do with it. In order to understand his capitulation, it is essential to grasp two things well: the first is that his approximately 4,000 infantry who had only 5 cannons, were trapped by a superior force of approximately 40,000 soldiers with 100 cannons, and that he was also cut off from De Wet's burghers outside the British encirclement line by a completely unfordable river.

— Johan Hendrik Breytenbach, Die Geskiedenis van die Tweede Vryheidsoorlog in Suid-Afrika, 1899–1902. Deel IV. Die Boereterugtog uit Kaapland (1974). Hoofstuk XVII. Die oorgawe van Genl. Cronjé. 7. Konklusie, page 427. In Afrikaans. (Translated title: The History of the Second War of Independence in South Africa, 1899–1902. Vol. IV. The Boer retreat from the Cape Colony. Chapter XVII. The surrender of General Cronjé.)

== Publications ==
Breytenbach's publications, all in Afrikaans, include:

- 1940: Andries François du Toit, sy Aandel in die Transvaalse Geskiedenis, Proefskrif Pretoria : Unisa, 1940. In 1942 in Series: Argiefjaarboek vir Suid-Afrikaanse geskiedenis.
- 1940: Gedenkalbum van die Tweede Vryheidsoorlog, Editor. Kaapstad, Nasionale Pers, 1940.
- 1943: with Beyers, Coenraad; Venter, P. J.; Franken, J. L. M.; Thom, H. B.; Botha, C. Graham: Argief-jaarboek vir Suid-Afrikaanse Geskiedenis/ Archives Year Book for South African History (Sixth Year), Authority of the Minister of the Interior, 1943.
- 1948-1949:
  - 1948: Die Tweede Vryheidsoorlog I. Voorspel tot die stryd, Nasionale Pers Beperk, Kaapstad, 1948.
  - 1949: Die Tweede Vryheidsoorlog II: Ontplooiing van die Boere-offensief Oktober 1899, Nasionale Pers Beperk, Kaapstad, 1949.
- 1949: Die betekenis van die tweede Vryheidsoorlog; vyftig jaar: 11 Okt. 1899 -- 11 Okt. 1949, Johannesburg: F.A.K., 1949. Federasie van Afrikaanse Kultuurvereniginge. Derde Uitgawe 2002, with A. E. Breytenbach: Die Volkskomitee vir die Herdenking van die Tweede Vryheidsoorlog, 2002. ISBN 9780620290845.
- 1949-1956: with Pretorius, H. S., and Joubert, D. C.: Suid-Afrikaanse Argiefstukke; Notule Van Die Volksraad van die Suid-Afrikaanse Republiek (volledig met alle bylae daarby). Dl. I (1949): 1844-1850, dl. II (1950): 1850-1853, dl. III, dl. IV (1952): 1859-1863, dl. V (1953): (1864-1866), Dl. VI (1956): 1866-1867. Cape Times Ltd. for the Government Printer, Cape Town.
- 1950: Kommandant Danie Theron: Baasverkenner van die Tweede Vrijheidsoorlog, Kaapstad: Nasionale Boekhandel Beperk, 1950.
- 1952-1953, with van der Vyver, W.B.: Suid-Afrikaanse Argiefstukke; Oranje-Vrystaat No. 1 : Notule van die Volksraad van die Oranje-Vrystaat. Deel 1 (1854 - 1855), South African archival records. Orange Free State, two volumes, Government Printer, Parow, Cape.
- 1954: Die Geskiedenis van die Krugerstandbeeld, Pretoria : Die Krugergenootskap, 1954. Nasionale Kultuurhistoriese en Opelugmuseum, Pretoria, 1979.
- 1958: Notule van die Natalse Volksraad (volledig met alle bylae daarby), Staatsdrukker, Parow 1958-1987. Reeks: Suid-Afrikaanse argiefstukke. Vol. 1: Notule Natalse Volksraad (met bylae) 1838-1845; Vol. 2: Records of the Natal Executive Council 1846-1848; Vol. 3: Records of the Natal Executive Council 1849-1852; Vol. 4: Records of the Natal Executive Council 1853-1856; Vol. 5: Records of the Natal Executive Council 1856-1859; Vol. 6: Records of the Natal government house despatches 1845-1846.
- Breytenbach, J. H. (1969–1996). Die Geskiedenis van die Tweede Vryheidsoorlog in Suid-Afrika, 1899–1902 [The History of the Second War of Independence in South Africa, 1899–1902] (in Afrikaans). Pretoria: Die Staatsdrukker.
  - Breytenbach, J. H. (1969). Die Boere-offensief, Okt. – Nov. 1899 [The Boer Offensive, Oct. – Nov. 1899]. Die Geskiedenis van die Tweede Vryheidsoorlog in Suid-Afrika, 1899–1902 (in Afrikaans). Vol. I. Pretoria: Die Staatsdrukker. OCLC 798106662.
  - Breytenbach, J. H. (1971). Die eerste Britse offensief, Nov. – Des. 1899 [The first British offensive, Nov. – Dec. 1899]. Die Geskiedenis van die Tweede Vryheidsoorlog in Suid-Afrika, 1899–1902 (in Afrikaans). Vol. II. Pretoria: Die Staatsdrukker. OCLC 768446219.
  - Breytenbach, J. H. (1973). Die stryd in Natal, Jan. – Feb. 1900 [The battle in Natal, Jan. – Feb. 1900]. Die Geskiedenis van die Tweede Vryheidsoorlog in Suid-Afrika, 1899–1902 (in Afrikaans). Vol. III. Pretoria: Die Staatsdrukker. ISBN 9780797012394. OCLC 612581136.
  - Breytenbach, J. H. (1977). Die Boereterugtog uit Kaapland [The Boer retreat from the Cape Colony]. Die Geskiedenis van die Tweede Vryheidsoorlog in Suid-Afrika, 1899–1902 (in Afrikaans). Vol. IV. Pretoria: Die Staatsdrukker. OCLC 249019723.
  - Breytenbach, J. H. (1983). Die Britse Opmars tot in Pretoria [The British advance to Pretoria]. Die Geskiedenis van die Tweede Vryheidsoorlog in Suid-Afrika, 1899–1902 (in Afrikaans). Vol. V. Pretoria: Die Staatsdrukker. ISBN 9780621083606. OCLC 769254652.
  - Breytenbach, J. H. (1996). Die beleg van Mafeking tot met die Slag van Bergendal [The siege of Mafeking up to the Battle of Bergendal]. Die Geskiedenis van die Tweede Vryheidsoorlog in Suid-Afrika, 1899–1902 (in Afrikaans). Vol. VI. Pretoria: Die Staatsdrukker. ISBN 9780797033214. OCLC 813492747.
- 1980: with Jan Ploeger: Majuba gedenkboek : uitgegee ter herdenking van die Boere se stryd ter verkryging van hul onafhanklikheid 'n eeu gelede, Roodepoort : Cum Boeke / CUM Books, 1980. ISBN 086984184X / ISBN 9780869841846.
