= Middelburg Commando =

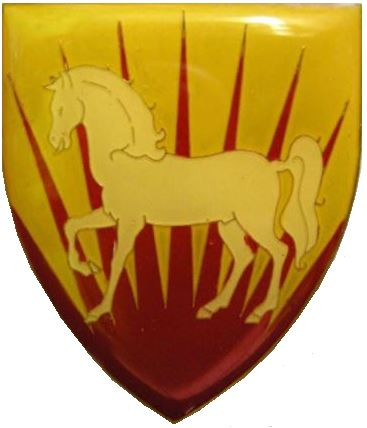
- Middelburg Commando emblem
- Country: South Africa
- Allegiance: Republic of South Africa; Republic of South Africa
- Branch: South African Army; South African Army
- Type: Infantry
- Role: Light Infantry
- Size: One Battalion
- Part of: South African Infantry Corps; Army Territorial Reserve
- Garrison/HQ: Middelburg

Middelburg Commando was a light infantry regiment of the South African Army. It formed part of the South African Army Infantry Formation as well as the South African Territorial Reserve.

== History ==
=== Origin ===
The Middelburg Commando can probably trace its origins to the Middelburg Vrywilligers (English: Middelburg Volunteers) of 1876 of the Middelburg, Mpumalanga town in the ZAR.

=== Operations ===
==== With the Republic of Transvaal ====
===== Boer Bagananwa War =====
During the period of 1894–95, the Middleburg commando was involved in the Siege of Leboho as a result of the government introducing a hut tax on people living in their suzerainty. Kgosi Maleboho and the Bahananwa refused to pay taxes and three commandos were sent to subdue them, besieging their mountain fortress.

===== Anglo Boer War =====
During the Anglo Boer War, the Middelburg Commando was engaged against the British at the Battle of Thukela Heights on 13 to 28 February 1900 and the Battle of Bergendal on 21 August 1900.

==== With the Union Defence Force ====
Closed down by the British following the Anglo Boer War, it then existed as a Rifle Association in the early 1920s until the formal establishment as a Rifle Commando around 1949.

==== With the SADF ====
During this era, the unit was mainly used for area force protection, search and cordones as well as stock theft control assistance to the rural police. The unit was part of the Danie Theron Group of the Northern Transvaal Command. It was then placed under the command of Group 12 HQ at Ermelo.

==== With the SANDF ====
===== Disbandment =====
This unit, along with all other Commando units was disbanded after a decision by South African President Thabo Mbeki to disband all Commando Units. The Commando system was phased out between 2003 and 2008 "because of the role it played in the apartheid era", according to the then Minister of Safety and Security, Charles Nqakula.

== Unit insignia ==
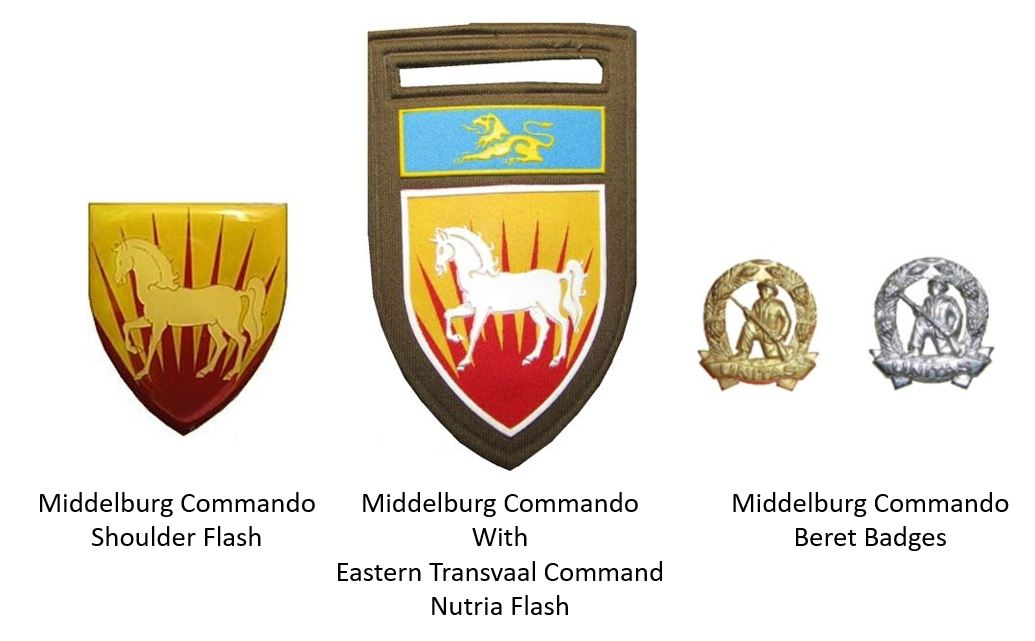
SADF era Middelburg Commando Insignia

== Leadership ==
Leadership
From	Honorary Colonels	To	Ribbon
	No known incumbents		
From	Commanding Officers	To	Ribbon
1899	Cmdt W.J. Steyn	1902	
1900	Cmdt Piet Trichaardt (Note: Took command at the Battle of Thukela Heights)	1900	
From	Regimental Sergeants Major	To	Ribbon
	No known incumbents		

== See also ==
- South African Commando System
