= Royal Canadian Dragoons =

Canadian Army armoured regiment

The Royal Canadian Dragoons
- Regimental badge
- Active: 1883–present
- Country: Canada
- Branch: Canadian Army
- Type: Armoured
- Role: Armoured cavalry
- Size: One regiment (4 squadrons and headquarters squadrons)
- Part of: 2 Canadian Mechanized Brigade Group
- Garrison/HQ: CFB Petawawa
- Mottos: Audax et celer (Latin for 'bold and swift')
- March: "Monsieur Beaucaire"; "Light of Foot" (dismounted)
- Mascot: Springbok
- Anniversaries: Leeuwarden; Leliefontein
- Equipment: See § Equipment
- Engagements: North-West Rebellion; Second Boer War; Advance on Pretoria; Battle of Doornkop; Battle of Diamond Hill; Battle of Witpoort; Battle of Leliefontein; World War I; Battle of Festubert; Battle of the Somme; Battle of Bazentin Ridge; Battle of Pozières; Battle of Flers-Courcelette; Battle of Cambrai (1917); Battle of St. Quentin (1918); Battle of Amiens (1918); Hindenburg Line; Battle of the St. Quentin Canal; Pursuit to Mons; World War II; Italy, 1944–1945; Gothic Line; Battle of San Marino; Battle of Rimini (1944); Winter Line; Battle of Groningen; Operation Diadem; Operation Snowgoose; War in Afghanistan; Operation Unifier
- Battle honours: See § Battle honours

Commanders
- Colonel-in-chief: Charles III
- Colonel of the regiment: MGen (Retired) Dean Milner, CMM, MSC, CD
- Commanding officer: LCol C. Summerfield, CD

Insignia
- NATO Map Symbol
- Abbreviation: RCD

The Royal Canadian Dragoons (RCD) is the senior armoured regiment of the Canadian Army by precedence. It is one of three armoured regiments in the Regular Force and forms part of the Royal Canadian Armoured Corps.

The colonel-in-chief of the RCD is Charles III, King of Canada. The colonel of the regiment is Major-General (Retired) Stephen Cadden, CD. The commanding officer is Lieutenant-Colonel C. Summerfield, and the regimental sergeant major is Chief Warrant Officer J. Nickerson. The regiment is composed of Regimental Headquarters, "A", "B", "C", "D" and Headquarters Squadrons. "A", "B" and "D" Squadrons, based at CFB Petawawa, are light cavalry squadrons. "C" Squadron is based at CFB Gagetown, and the squadron consists of both Dragoons and members of 12^{e} Régiment blindé du Canada. Headquarters Squadron, based in Petawawa, provides first-line combat service support to the regiment.

== Lineage ==
=== The Royal Canadian Dragoons ===
- Originated 21 December 1883 in Quebec City, Quebec as the Cavalry School Corps
- Redesignated 14 May 1892 as the Canadian Dragoons
- Amalgamated 27 June 1892 with the Canadian Mounted Rifle Corps in Winnipeg, Manitoba (lineage below): retaining its designation
- Redesignated 24 May 1893 as The Royal Canadian Dragoons
- Redesignated 16 October 1946 as the 1st Armoured Regiment (Royal Canadian Dragoons), RCAC
- Redesignated 2 March 1949 as the Royal Canadian Dragoons (1st Armoured Regiment)
- Redesignated 19 May 1958 as Royal Canadian Dragoons
- Redesignated 12 January 1959 as The Royal Canadian Dragoons

=== The Canadian Mounted Rifle Corps ===
- Originated 20 July 1885 in Winnipeg, Manitoba as the School of Mounted Infantry
- Redesignated 7 August 1891 as the Canadian Mounted Rifle Corps
- Amalgamated 27 June 1892 with the Canadian Dragoons

== History ==
=== Formation ===
Formed on December 21, 1883 as the Cavalry School Corps, The Royal Canadian Dragoons is the senior cavalry regiment in the Canadian Army and was Canada's first professional, full-time cavalry unit. It was originally organized as a troop (the then-company-sized British Army cavalry maneuver sub-unit, today regarded as a squadron) and was commanded by Captain (Brevet Lieutenant-Colonel) J.F. Turnbull of Quebec City's Queen's Own Canadian Hussars. The first Regimental Sergeant-Major was Sergeant-Major George Baxter, recruited by Lt.-Col. Turnbull from the British Army's 4th Dragoon Guards at Aldershot along with two other British Army Sergeant-Instructors from the 7th Dragoon Guards and the 15th The King's Hussars.

=== North-West Rebellion ===
The Cavalry School Corps mobilized A Troop on 10 April 1885 for active service during the North-West Rebellion. It served with the Alberta Column of the North-West Field Force until it was removed from active service on 18 September 1885. A Troop patrolled the Touchwood Hills in Saskatchewan to secure lines of communication and saw no active combat.

=== South African War ===
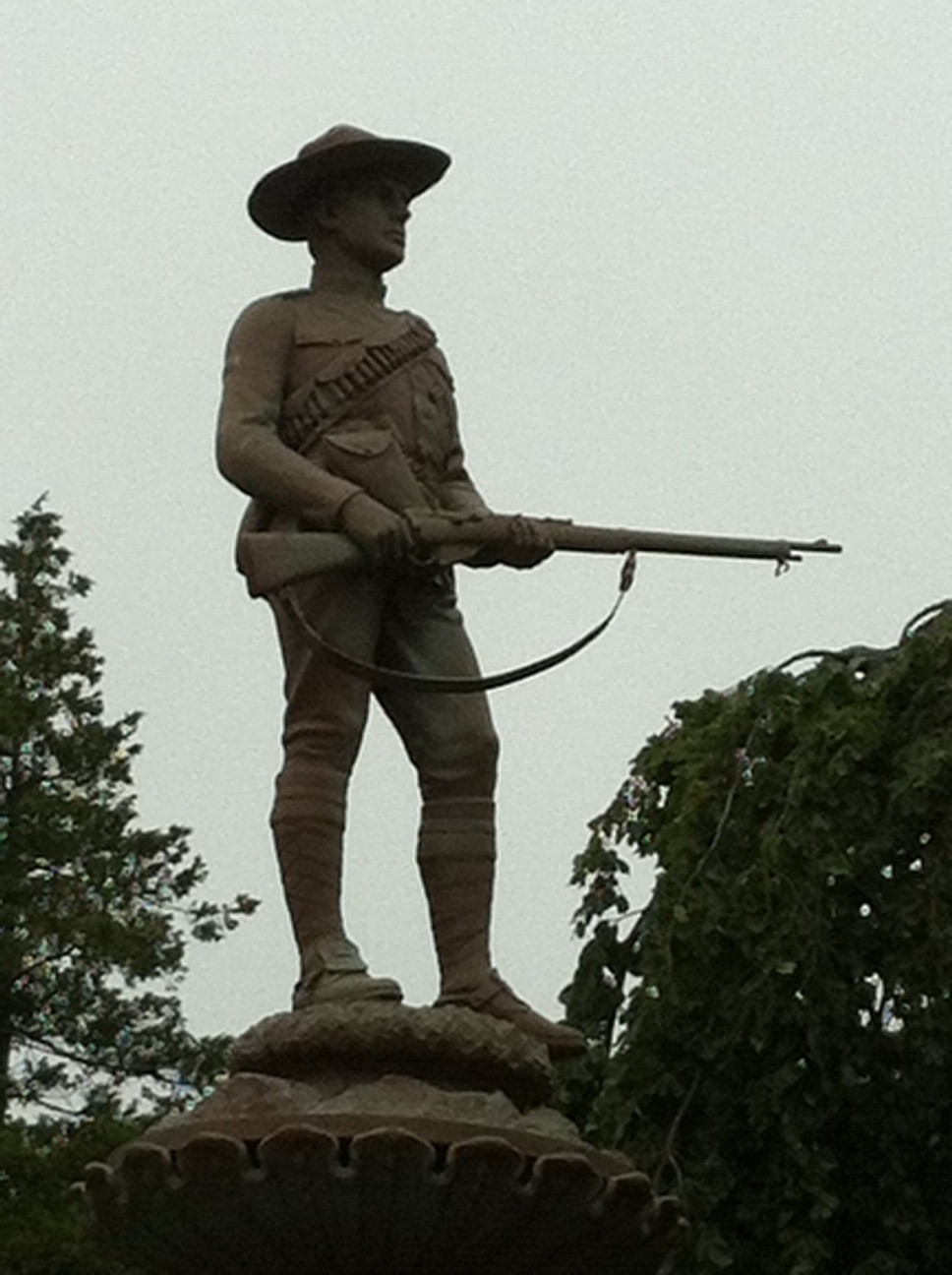
Royal Canadian Dragoons, Boer War Sculpture by sculptor Hamilton MacCarthy (1903), Halifax Public Gardens, Nova Scotia

The regiment was mobilized for service in South Africa during the Second Boer War as the 1st Battalion, Canadian Mounted Rifles, and composed of 19 officers and 371 men and their horses, organized into two squadrons. The battalion embarked for South Africa on 21 February 1900, where it fought as part of the 1st Brigade, 1st Mounted Infantry Corps and as part of Major-General Horace Smith-Dorrien's column until its departure from the theatre of operations on 13 December 1900. The nucleus of each squadron was provided by the experienced regular officers, non-commissioned officers and men from The Royal Canadian Dragoons. For this reason on 1 August 1900, at the unit's own request, the 1st Canadian Mounted Rifles were renamed the Royal Canadian Dragoons. By 12 November 1900 the regiment's strength was down to three officers and 83 other ranks.

Two famous Dragoon casualties of South Africa were Lieutenant Harold Lothrop Borden, son of the then-Minister for Militia and Defence Frederick William Borden and Major A.L. "Gat" Howard, formerly the regiment's Machine Gun Officer, who remained behind in South Africa to command "Howard's Canadian Scouts." Gat Howard was captured and murdered while a prisoner. During the regiment's service in South Africa every junior officer, except for one, was killed in action, died of disease or was wounded, the regiment marched more than 2700 kilometers (1700 miles) and had been in action on 41 separate days.

Three Dragoons were awarded the Victoria Cross for the gallant stand at Leliefontein on 7 November 1900, a feat of arms never surpassed by Canadians.

=== Great War ===
The regiment was placed on active service on 6 August 1914 for instructional and camp administration duties. On 14 September 1914 the regiment mobilized The Royal Canadian Dragoons, CEF, which embarked for England on 3 October 1914. On 5 May 1915 it disembarked in France, where it fought dismounted in an infantry role as part of Seely's Detachment (really the Canadian Cavalry Brigade), 1st Canadian Division. On 24 January 1916, it remounted and resumed its cavalry role as part of the 1st Canadian Cavalry Brigade with whom it continued to fight in France and Flanders until the end of the war. The overseas regiment disbanded on 6 November 1920.

=== Second World War ===
The camp flag of The Royal Canadian Dragoons

At the start of the Second World War, The Royal Canadian Dragoons were still horse cavalry and would remain so until the regiment finally dismounted in August, 1940. On 24 May 1940, the regimental headquarters and one squadron mobilized together with the headquarters and one squadron of Lord Strathcona's Horse (Royal Canadians) to form the short-lived 1st Canadian Motorcycle Regiment, CASF (RCD/LSH (RC)). On 21 September 1940, this regiment was redesignated as Lord Strathcona's Horse (Royal Canadians) CASF and the Dragoons returned to the regiment. The regiment subsequently mobilized as an armoured car regiment, The Royal Canadian Dragoons (Armoured Car Regiment), CASF, on 21 September 1940. It was initially earmarked to serve in the 5th Canadian Armoured Division and embarked for Britain on 13 November 1941. The RCD landed in Sicily on 8 November 1943 and moved to mainland Italy on 5 January 1944. There it fought as the armoured car regiment for I Canadian Corps until being transferred to the 1st Canadian Infantry Division as the divisional armoured car regiment on 14 July 1944. Due to the mountainous terrain of Italy, the regiment fought much of its time there in a dismounted role as infantry.

In March 1945 the regiment moved with the I Canadian Corps to North-West Europe as part of Operation Goldflake, and the regiment resumed its role as the I Canadian Corps's armoured car regiment. The regiment was heavily engaged in operations in the Netherlands and Germany until the end of the war. The RCD was the first Allied unit to advance through Holland to the North Sea, famously liberated the city of Leeuwarden and fought off an attempted German amphibious assault. The fighting was so intense and chaotic that two of the squadron sergeants-major, WOII Deeming and WOII Forgrave, were separately awarded the Distinguished Conduct Medal (second in precedence to the Victoria Cross) for dismounting the members of their supply convoys and fighting through enemy infantry positions to get fuel, ammunition, water and rations forward to their squadrons.

On 1 September 1945 a second Active Force component of the regiment mobilized for service in the Pacific theatre of operations designated as the 2nd-1st Armoured Car Regiment (The Royal Canadian Dragoons), RCAC, CASF. It was redesignated as the 2nd-1st Armoured Regiment (The Royal Canadian Dragoons), RCAC, CASF, on 15 November 1945; and as the 1st Armoured Regiment (The Royal Canadian Dragoons), RCAC, CASF, on 1 March 1946. On 27 June 1946 the regiment was embodied in the Permanent Force.

=== Korea ===
D Squadron, equipped with M4A3E8 Sherman tanks rented from the U.S. Army, served in Korea following the armistice in 1954. Lieut Frank Sidney Stilwell died in a vehicle accident while deployed to Korea on 25 January 1954. "Dog Squadron", so-called because Dog was the word for the letter D in the old phonetic alphabet, were the last Canadians to operationally employ Sherman tanks.

=== UN and NATO ===
The Royal Canadian Dragoons, along with Lord Strathcona's Horse (Royal Canadians), contributed troops to 56 Reconnaissance Squadron for duty with the United Nations Emergency Force (UNEF) from March 1957 to January 1959, equipped with Ferret scout cars. The Officer Commanding, Major R. Barry Tackaberry, the Second-in-Command, Capt. J.A. Beament, the 2nd Troop Leader, Lt J.G.H. Ferguson, and the 4th Troop Leader, Lt J.B. Long, as well as half of the NCOs and soldiers, were Dragoons. Other squadrons of the regiment served there and in Cyprus. Two members of 56 Recce Squadron died: Lt Charles C. Van Straubenzee on 10 May 1957 and Trooper George E. McDavid on 29 November 1957. The regiment contributed several other recce squadrons to UNEF until its demise in 1967. Trooper Ronald H. Allan was killed by Egyptian machine gun fire on 28 November 1959.

The regiment was part of the initial deployment to Cyprus as part of Operation Snowgoose, Canada's long contribution to UNFICYP, and conducted other squadron-sized tours as well as a regimental deployment from March to September 1989. Trooper. Joseph H. "Fess" Campbell died in Cyprus on 31 July 1964.

The regiment served at Fort Beausejour, Iserlohn, Germany, from November 1957 to November 1959

The regiment served at CFB Lahr, West Germany, as part of 4 Canadian Mechanized Brigade Group from 1970 to 1987 equipped with Centurion, rented German Leopard 1 and Leopard C1 tanks and Lynx tracked reconnaissance vehicles. During this time, the Canadian Forces ceased conducting regimental rotations to 4 CMBG, going instead to a man-for-man individual rotation system.

During the 1990s, the regiment conducted deployments to the Former Yugoslavia with the UN as part of United Nations Protection Force, and with NATO as part of Implementation Force, Stabilisation Force in Bosnia and Herzegovina and in Kosovo with Kosovo Force. Corporal James William Ogilvie died in Bosnia on 30 August 1998.

=== Afghanistan ===
The Royal Canadian Dragoons contributed both reconnaissance and tank crews to the Canadian task forces that served in Afghanistan from 2002 to 2014.

The following Dragoons died in Afghanistan:

- Sergeant Craig Paul Gillam, 3 October 2006
- Corporal Robert Thomas Mitchell, 3 October 2006
- Trooper Mark Andrew Wilson, 7 October 2006
- Master Corporal Allan Stewart, 11 April 2007
- Trooper Patrick James Pentland, 11 April 2007
- Trooper Darryl Caswell, 11 June 2007
- Major Raymond Ruckpaul, 22 August 2007
- Trooper Brian Richard Good, 7 January 2009
- Trooper Marc Diab, 8 March 2009
- Trooper Jack Bouthillier, 20 March 2009
- Trooper Corey Joseph Hayes, 20 March 2009
- Trooper Larry John Zuidema Rudd, 24 May 2010

=== Ukraine ===
Operation Unifier, also known as Canadian Armed Forces Joint Task Force-Ukraine, is Canada's military mission to provide assistance to the training and professionalization of the Ukrainian Armed Forces. The Royal Canadian Dragoons contributed officers and soldiers to various rotations pre-Russia's February 2022 large-scale illegal invasion, including mounting and leading Rotation 5, and continue today to contribute to various ongoing missions to train the Security Forces of Ukraine to defend their homeland.

=== Lineage chart ===
Lineage chart

1883	Cavy School Corps
1885	A Tp, Cavy School Corps (Note: Active service April–November)	School of Mounted Infy
1891	Canadian Mounted Rifle Corps
1892	Canadian Dragoons
1892	Canadian Dragoons
1893	The Royal Canadian Dragoons
1899	The CMR
1899	1st Bn, CMR	2nd Bn, The CMR
1900	The Royal Canadian Dragoons (Special Service Force)	The CMR
1901	Disbanded
1914	The Royal Canadian Dragoons, CEF
1920	Disbanded
1940	1st Canadian Motorcycle Regt, CASF (RCD/LSH (RC))
1940	Lord Strathcona's Horse (Royal Canadians), CASF	The Royal Canadian Dragoons (Armd Car Regt), CASF
1941	1st Armd Car Regt (The Royal Canadian Dragoons), CASF
1943	1st Armd Car Regt (The Royal Canadian Dragoons), CAC, CASF
1945	1st Armd Car Regt (The Royal Canadian Dragoons), RCAC, CASF	2nd-1st Armd Car Regt (The Royal Canadian Dragoons), RCAC, CASF
1945	2nd-1st Armd Regt (The Royal Canadian Dragoons), RCAC, CASF
1946	Disbanded	1st Armd Regt (The Royal Canadian Dragoons), RCAC, CASF
1946	Embodied in Permanent Force	1st Armd Regt (Royal Canadian Dragoons), RCAC
1949	Royal Canadian Dragoons (1st Armd Regt)
1958	Royal Canadian Dragoons
1959	The Royal Canadian Dragoons

== Recognition ==
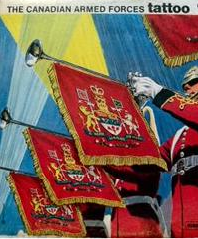
A poster for the Canadian Armed Forces Tattoo 1967 depicting members of the Royal Canadian Dragoons Band with fanfare trumpets.

On 10 November 1983 Canada Post issued "The Royal Winnipeg Rifles, The Royal Canadian Dragoons" as part of the Canadian Forces, Regiments, 1883–1983 series. The stamps were designed by Ralph Tibbles, based on a painting by William Southern. The 32¢ stamps are perforated 13.5 × 13 and were printed by Canadian Bank Note Company, Limited.

== Springbok cap badge ==
The cap badge of the Royal Canadian Dragoons since 1913 has featured a springbok in recognition of the regiment's service in South Africa.

In the Second Boer War (1899–1902) during the advance to Pretoria, the RCD set up camp in a field. Regimental legend has it that one of the sentries noticed that some springbok were behaving erratically, and alerted the officers, who ordered a stand-to. This resulted in the defeat of Boer forces that had been sneaking up through the fields to attack the Canadian force. However, there is no documentary evidence of this incident. The commanding officer at that time, Lieutenant-Colonel Louis Lessard, makes no mention of it in his personal papers or his official reports. The commander of the RCD then put a request to King Edward VII, the reigning monarch, to have their cap badge officially changed to the springbok, which was finally accepted in 1913.

== Battle honours ==
1998 guidon

In the list below, battle honours in capitals were awarded for participation in large operations and campaigns, while those in lowercase indicate honours granted for more specific battles. Those battle honours in bold type are emblazoned on the regimental guidon. On 9 December 2022, Governor General Mary Simon presented the regiment with a guidon that includes the battle honour Afghanistan.

=== North-West Rebellion ===
- **North West Canada, 1885**

=== South African War ===
- **South Africa, 1900**

=== Great War ===
- **Festubert, 1915**
- **Somme, 1916, '18**
- **Bazentin**
- Pozières
- Flers–Courcelette
- **Cambrai, 1917, '18**
- **St. Quentin**
- **Amiens**
- **Hindenburg Line**
- St. Quentin Canal
- **Beaurevoir**
- **Pursuit to Mons**
- **France and Flanders, 1915–18**

=== Second World War ===
- **Liri Valley**
- **Gothic Line**
- **Lamone Crossing**
- Misano Ridge
- Sant'Angelo in Salute
- Fosso Vecchio
- **Italy, 1944–1945**
- **Groningen**
- Bad Zwischenahn
- **North-West Europe, 1945**

=== Southwest Asia ===
- **Afghanistan**

=== Guidon history ===
The regiment has possessed five regimental guidons in its history. Some retired guidons are laid up at the church at CFB Petawawa or at Beechwood Cemetery in Ottawa.

Guidons of the Royal Canadian Dragoons
Date	Presenter	Location	Notes
11 October 1901	Prince George, Duke of Cornwall and York	Toronto, Ontario	Emblazoned with battle honours from the North West Rebellion and the South African War
1919	Prince Arthur of Connaught	Bramshott Camp, England	Great War battle honours later emblazoned in the 1930s
23 May 1964	Governor General Georges Vanier	Camp Gagetown, New Brunswick	First guidon to be emblazoned with Second World War battle honours
19 June 1998	Governor General Roméo LeBlanc	CFB Petawawa, Ontario	
9 December 2022	Governor General Mary Simon	CFB Petawawa, Ontario	First guidon to be emblazoned with Afghanistan

== Victoria Crosses ==
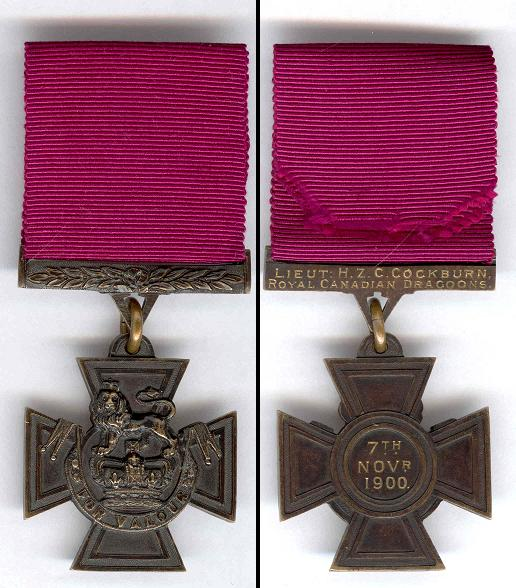
Lieutenant Cockburn's VC

During the Second Boer War on November 7, 1900, The Royal Canadian Dragoons were engaged in the Action at Leliefontein. The regiment, operating in concert with the two 12 Pounder guns of the Left Section of D Battery, Royal Canadian Artillery, was acting as the rear guard for Major-General Sir Horace Smith-Dorrien's column as it withdrew from the Komati River basin. The Boers had recently captured a quantity of British artillery ammunition and aggressively pressed the rear guard in an attempt to capture the two D Battery guns, even conducting a very rare mounted charge. In the end, the guns and the column were saved. Three Victoria Crosses were awarded to members of The Royal Canadian Dragoons for their actions during the course of the day:

- Lieutenant H. Z .C. Cockburn
- Lieutenant R. E. W. Turner
- Sergeant E. J. G. Holland

== Regimental alliances ==
- United Kingdom – The Blues and Royals (Royal Horse Guards and 1st Dragoons)
- United States – 3rd Squadron, 71st Cavalry Regiment (Light Horse) (Bond of Friendship)

== Order of precedence ==
Preceded by First in order of precedence of Canadian armoured regiments	The Royal Canadian Dragoons	Succeeded by Lord Strathcona's Horse (Royal Canadians)

== See also ==
- List of regiments of cavalry of the Canadian Militia (1900–1920)
- List of mounted regiments in the Canadian Expeditionary Force
- List of Canadian organizations with royal patronage
- The Canadian Crown and the Canadian Forces
- Intelligence, surveillance, target acquisition, and reconnaissance
- List of units of the Canadian Army
- Authorized marches of the Canadian Forces
- Canadian Forces order of precedence
