= Sillery =

Sillery may refer to:

== Places ==
- Sillery, Marne, a commune in Marne, France
- Sillery, Quebec City, a former municipality, today a district of Quebec City, Canada
- Sillery Heritage Site, commemorating Sillery in the early history of Québec

== People with the name ==
- Noël Brûlart de Sillery (1577–1640), French diplomat, Knight of Malta and religious figure after whom the district in Quebec is named
- Pierre Brulart, marquis de Sillery (1583–1640), Foreign minister of France under Louis XIII
- Fabio Brulart de Sillery (1655–1714), French churchman, bishop of Avranches and bishop of Soissons

== Fiction ==
- A recurring character in the novel sequence A Dance to the Music of Time by Anthony Powell.
