= Cilley =

Cilley is a surname. Notable people with the surname include:

- Bradbury Cilley (1760–1831), United States Representative from New Hampshire
- Clinton A. Cilley (1837–1900), North Carolina lawyer and judge, and a recipient of the Medal of Honor
- Jacalyn Cilley, Democratic member of the New Hampshire Senate, representing the 6th District since 2006
- Jonathan Cilley (1802–1838), member of the U.S. House of Representatives from Maine
- Jorge Cilley (1914–1960), Argentine rugby union player
- José Cilley (born 1972), Argentine rugby union player
- Joseph Cilley (senator) (1791–1887), United States Senator from New Hampshire
- Joseph Cilley (state senator) (1734–1799), New Hampshire state senator and general
- Juan Cilley (1898–1954), Argentine footballer
- Noble Cilley Powell, also known as Noble C. Powell, (1891–1968), leader in the Episcopal Church in the USA

== See also ==
- Cilley Hall, dormitory at Phillips Exeter Academy in Exeter, New Hampshire, United States, named after Bradbury Cilley
- Vanesa Siley (born 1984), Argentine politician
- Chilly (disambiguation)
- Scilly
- Sillery (disambiguation)
