= Sillery Heritage Site =

- Site patrimonial de Sillery (French); Arrondissement historique de Sillery (French)
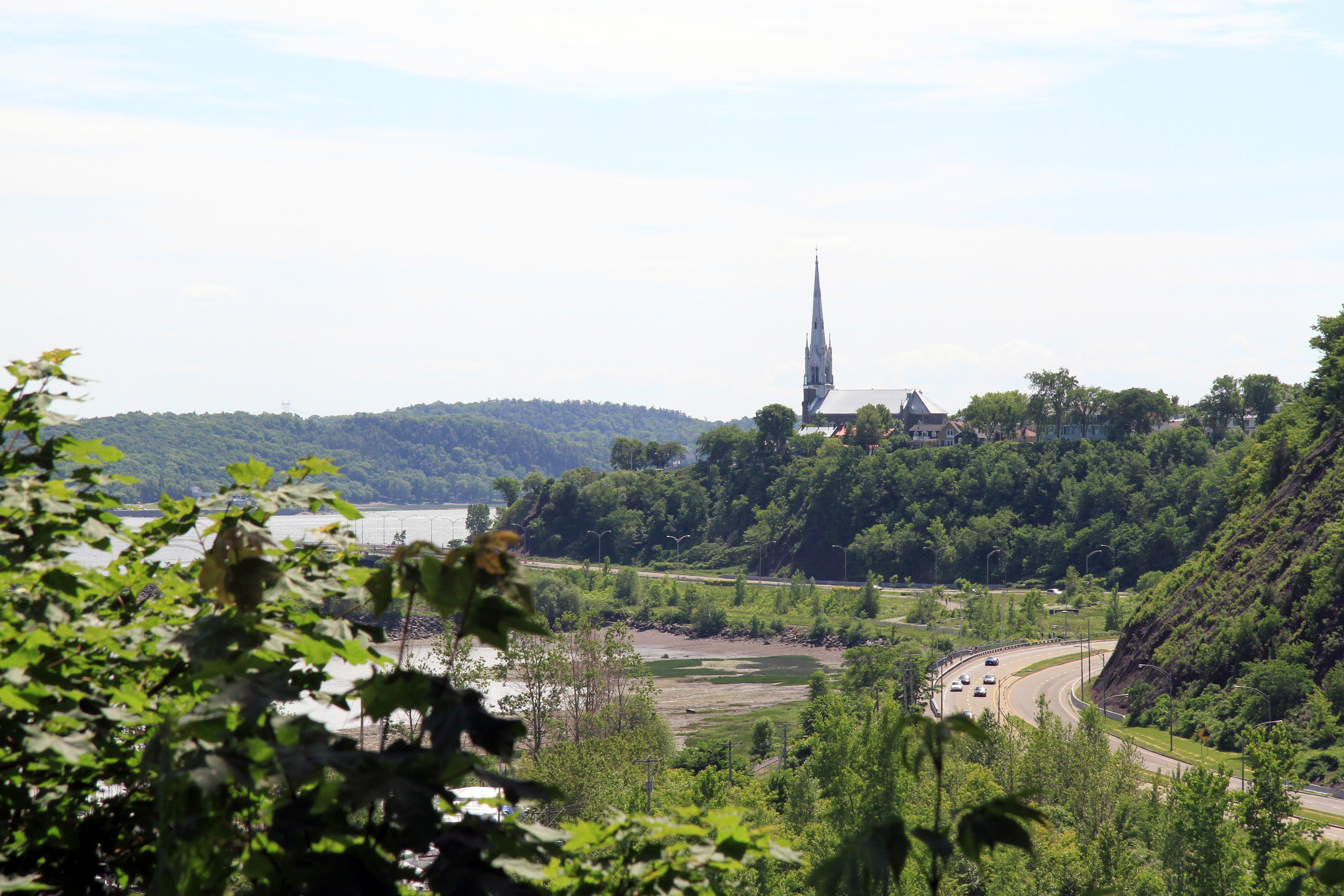
- View of Saint-Michel de Sillery Church
- Interactive map of Sillery Heritage Site
- 46°46′40″N 71°14′50″W
- Type: Heritage site
- Etymology: Noël Brûlart de Sillery
- Location: Sillery, Quebec City, Quebec, Canada

History
- Settled: 1637; 389 years ago
- Founder: Noël Brûlart de Sillery (financier); Jesuits
- Built for: Jesuit missionaries; Catholic Church; Louis XIII
- Original use: Saint-Joseph Mission of Sillery — Jesuit mission to members of the First Nations

Site notes
- Governing body: City of Quebec (effective June 9, 2017); Government of Quebec (1964–2017)

Patrimoine culturel du Québec
- Official name: Site patrimonial de Sillery
- Type: Declared Heritage Site
- Designated: February 5, 1964
- Reference no.: 93522

The Sillery Heritage Site (French: site patrimonial de Sillery) is an area containing historic residences and institutional properties located in the Sainte-Foy–Sillery–Cap-Rouge borough of Quebec City, Quebec, Canada. It was the first of 13 declared heritage sites (French: sites patrimoniaux déclarés) of the Province of Quebec, and is among the four of which are located in Quebec City. Having been called the "cradle of the French Canadian nation," the heritage site includes approximately 350 buildings along 3.5 kilometres (2.175 miles) of the Saint Lawrence River shoreline. The Sillery Heritage Site includes buildings constructed during every major period of Quebec's history, dating back to the time of New France.

== Heritage designation ==
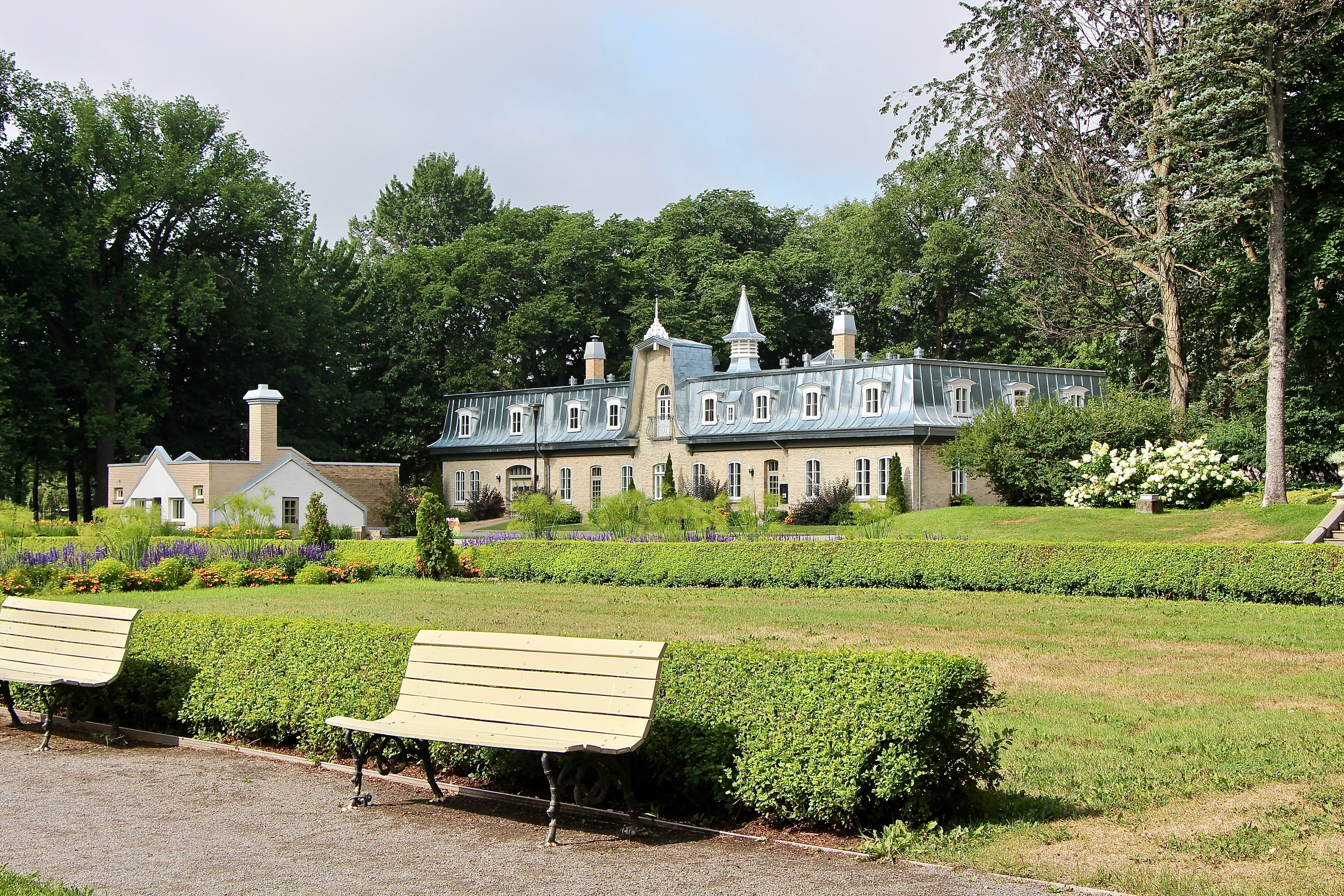
Bois-de-Coulonge Park

Heritage designation began as early as 1929, when the Jesuit House was assigned protective status. The entire territory was officially recognized as a declared heritage site (French: site patrimonial déclaré) by the Government of Quebec on February 5, 1964. The heritage site was listed on Parks Canada's administered Canadian Register of Historic Places (CRHP; (French: Répertoire canadien des lieux patrimoniaux), also known as Canada's Historic Places, on June 22, 2006. The declared heritage site consists of five categorical groups of associated elements: 629 associated heritage immovable/real properties (including classified heritage immovable), nine associated movable heritage objects, 18 associated commemorative plaques, two associated groups (Society of Jesus and Société des prêtres du Séminaire de Québec), and three associated persons (General James Murray, Noël Brûlart de Sillery, and Jean-Antoine Panet).

While recognizing the visionary action taken by Quebec's Ministry of Culture (French: ministère de la Culture), in the 1960s, by conferring historic status upon the district to protect it from suburban developers, the National Trust for Canada (French: Fiducie nationale du Canada), a national registered charity in Canada, placed the Sillery Historic District on its Top 10 Endangered Places list (French: Palmarès des 10 sites les plus menacés), in the early 2010s, due to the approval of condominium developments which encroached upon historic religious properties in the district. In 2015, the City of Quebec announced that it would encourage any future developers to restore historic religious structures which were no longer owned by their former communities, in exchange for the allowance to undertake development on the surrounding lands. The city argued that some development was necessary to provide tax revenue in order to sustain the preservation of the historic district. The Trust has subsequently removed the Sillery Historic District from its endangered list, and archived its status as a past listing, among other properties, spread across all of Canada's provinces and territories.

== Historic Properties ==
Among the district's properties are the early 18th century Jesuit House of Sillery (French: maison des Jésuites-de-Sillery), 19th century workers' homes on Foulon Road (French: chemin du Foulon (also known during this time period by the English language name Cove Road)) and the Sillery coast (near Saint-Michel of Sillery Church (French: église Saint-Michel-de-Sillery), villas built by wood barons in the 19th century, and institutional properties built at the turn of the 20th century.

Partial List of Properties
| Name | Address | Coordinates (links to map & photo sources) | Name (in French) |
|---|---|---|---|
| George William Usborne House (classified heritage immovable) | 2316, chemin du Foulon | 46°46′04″N 71°15′28″W | French: maison George-William-Usborne |
| Jesuit House of Sillery (classified heritage immovable) | 2320, chemin du Foulon | 46°46′07″N 71°15′29″W | French: maison des Jésuites-de-Sillery |
| Villa Bagatelle (also known as Spencer Cottage) | 1563, chemin Saint-Louis | 46°47′18″N 71°14′48″W | |
| Saint-Patrick Cemetery | 1601, chemin Saint-Louis | 46°47′08″N 71°14′47″W | French: cimetière Saint-Patrick |
| Mount Hermon Cemetery National Historic Site of Canada) | 1801, chemin Saint-Louis | 46°46′51″N 71°14′50″W | French: cimetière Mount Hermon |
| Cataraqui Estate (classified heritage immovable) | 2141, chemin Saint-Louis | 46°46′23″N 71°15′11″W | French: domaine Cataraqui |
| Villa Beauvoir | 2315, chemin Saint-Louis | 46°46′11″N 71°15′39″W | |
| Kilmarnock Manor, residence of John MacNider | 1479A, rue Negabamat | 46°46′04″N 71°15′52″W | French: manoir Kilmarnock |
| Bois-de-Coulonge Park (Spencer Wood / Government House) | 1215, Grande Allée Ouest | 46°47′20″N 71°14′24″W | French: parc du Bois-de-Coulonge |
| Saint-Michel de Sillery Church | Views of the Quebec Bridge and statue of the Virgin Mary 1735, côte de Sillery | 46°46′28″N 71°14′39″W | French: église Saint-Michel de Sillery |

- Spencer Grange, 1328, avenue Duquet
- Canadian Montmartre and Sanctuary of the Sacred Heart (French: Montmartre Canadien et Sanctuaire du Sacré-Cœur), 1669, chemin Saint-Louis
- Villa Benmore, 2071, chemin Saint-Louis
- Villa Clermont, 2211, chemin Saint-Louis
- Bignell House (French: maison Bignell), 1524, côte à Gignac
- Timmony House (French: maison Timmony), 2014, rue Louis-H. Lafontaine

== Bibliography ==
- "Visual Perspectives — Appendix XI.7 — Plan 1 of 1" (PDF) (in Canadian French). Planning and Conservation Commission, City of Quebec. Department of Legal Affairs, City of Quebec. October 2015.
- "List of Historic Buildings located on the Sillery Heritage Site — Appendix XI.7" (PDF) (in Canadian French). Planning and Conservation Commission, City of Quebec. Department of Legal Affairs, City of Quebec. October 2015.
- "2016 Map of the Heritage Site" (PDF). Department of Planning and Urban Development, Architecture and Heritage Division. Department of Legal Affairs, City of Quebec (in Canadian French). 2016.
- Plan de conservation — site patrimonial de Sillery (PDF) (in Canadian French). Ministère de la Culture et des Communications. July 2013. ISBN 978-2-550-65817-7.

== See also ==
- List of historic places in Capitale-Nationale
- Sillery, Quebec City
- Mount Hermon Cemetery
- History of Quebec
