= St. Michel de Sillery Church (Quebec City) =

- Église Saint-Michel; Église Saint-Michel-de-Sillery
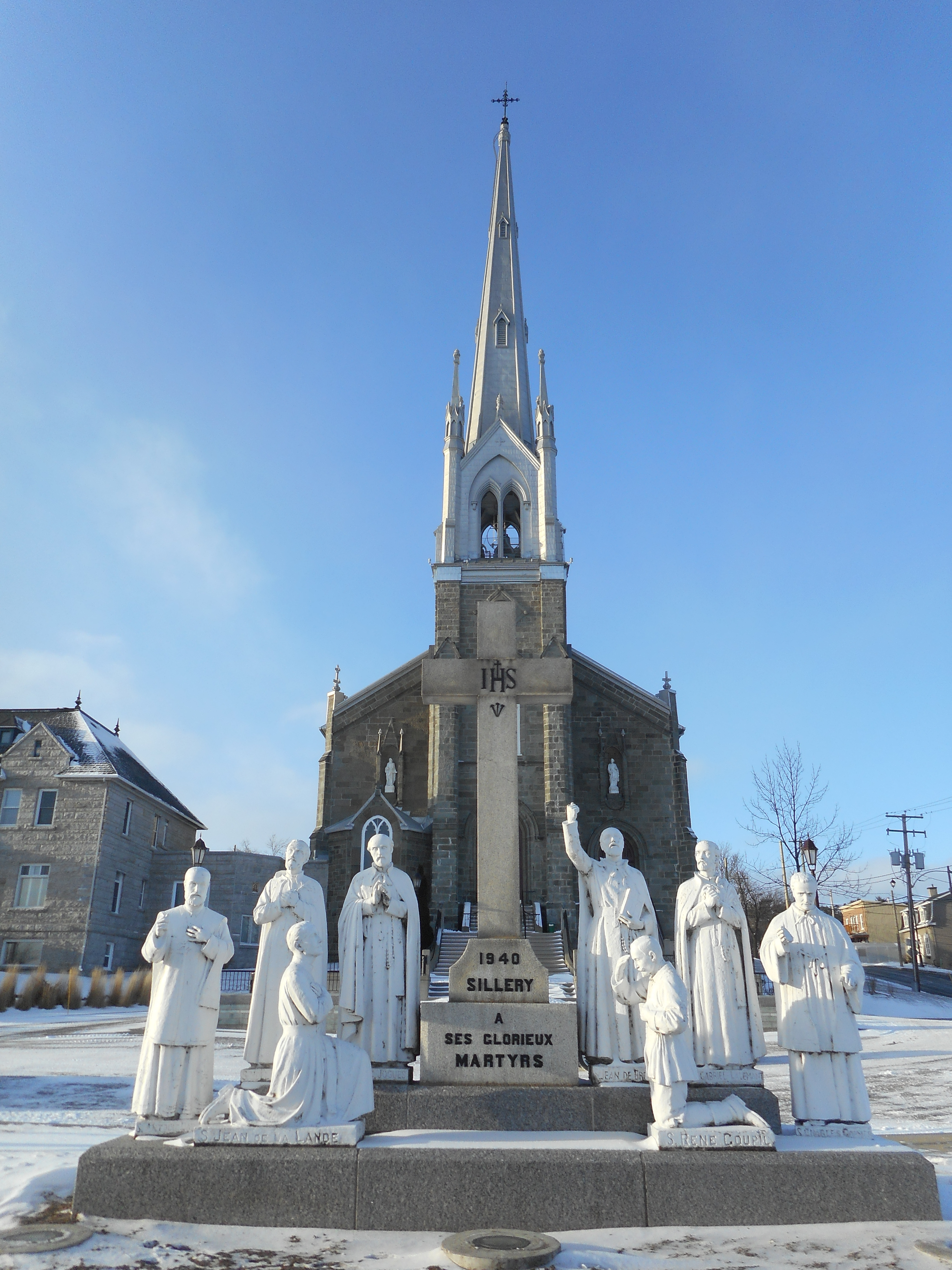
- Front with statues of the Canadian Martyrs

- Location in Quebec City
- 46°46′27″N 71°14′39″W
- Location: 1600, rue du Cardinal-Persico; Quebec City, Quebec; G1T 1H3
- Country: Canada
- Denomination: Roman Catholic
- Website: dinabelanger.ca

History
- Former name: St Columb Church
- Status: Parish church
- Founded: 1644
- Founder: Society of Jesus
- Dedication: Saint Michael
- Dedicated: 1969

Architecture
- Functional status: Active
- Heritage designation: Part of a Quebec heritage property (Sillery Heritage Site)
- Designated: February 5, 1964
- Architects: Goodlatte Richardson Browne; Joseph-Ferdinand Peachy
- Style: Gothic Revival
- Years built: 1852–1854
- Groundbreaking: Autumn 1852
- Completed: November 1854
- Construction cost: 3147 louis

Specifications
- Length: 36.6 m (120 ft 1 in)
- Width: 18.3 m (60 ft 0 in)
- Height: 9.1 m (29 ft 10 in)
- Materials: Sandstone, sheet metal, plaster

Administration
- Archdiocese: Quebec
- Parish: Bienheureuse-Dina-Bélanger

St. Michel de Sillery Church (French: église Saint-Michel de Sillery) is a Roman Catholic parish church in Sillery, Quebec City. It is situated between Quebec Route 136 to the south and the College of Jesus and Mary of Sillery to the north, and is part of the Sillery Heritage Site in the borough of Sainte-Foy–Sillery–Cap-Rouge. Although the current church was built in 1852, and originally dedicated to the Irish Saint Columba, the parish was founded in 1644, with a chapel constructed on the same site by the Jesuits.

== History ==
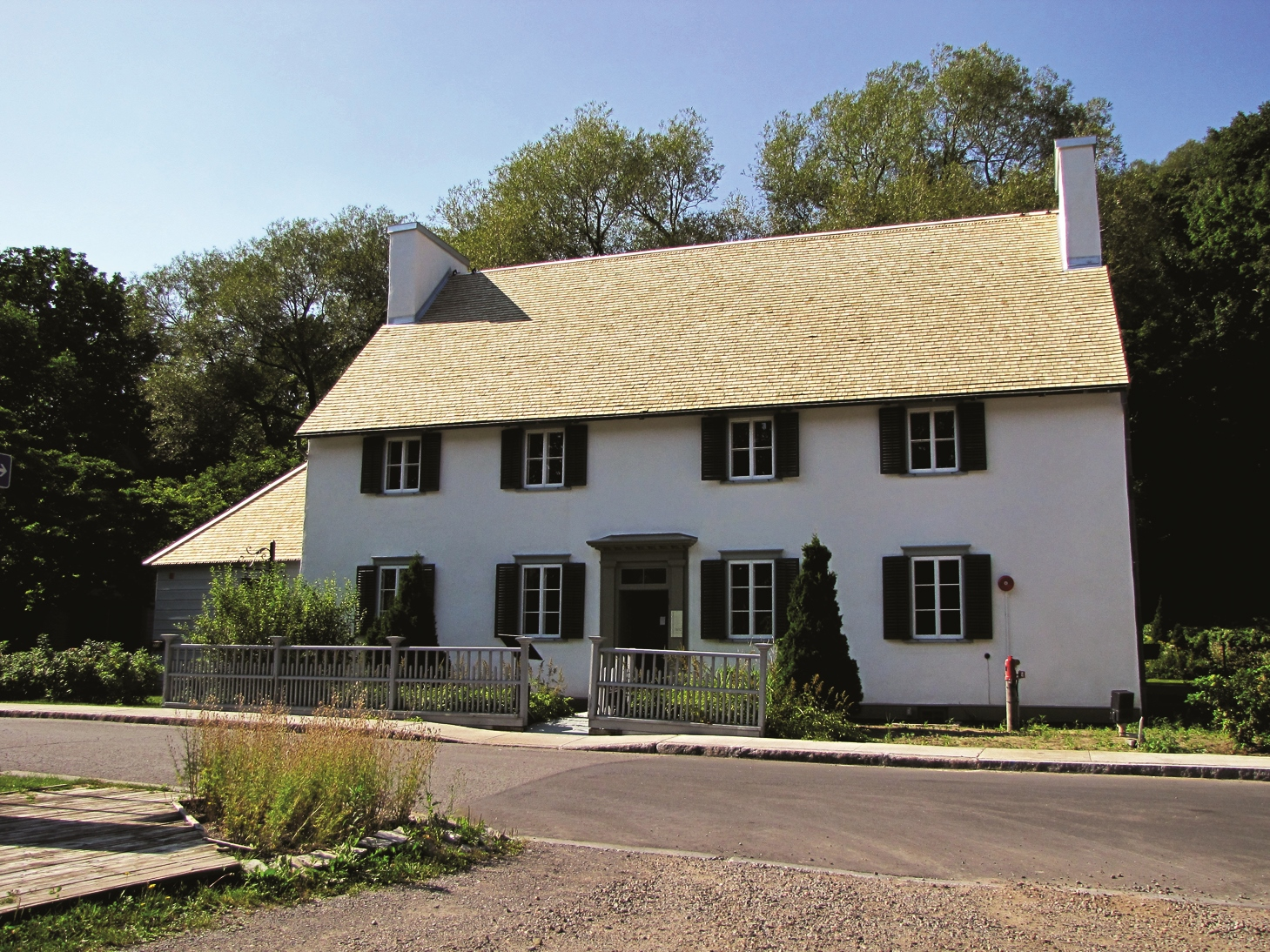
Maison des Jésuites-de-Sillery, the house of the Jesuits, near the church

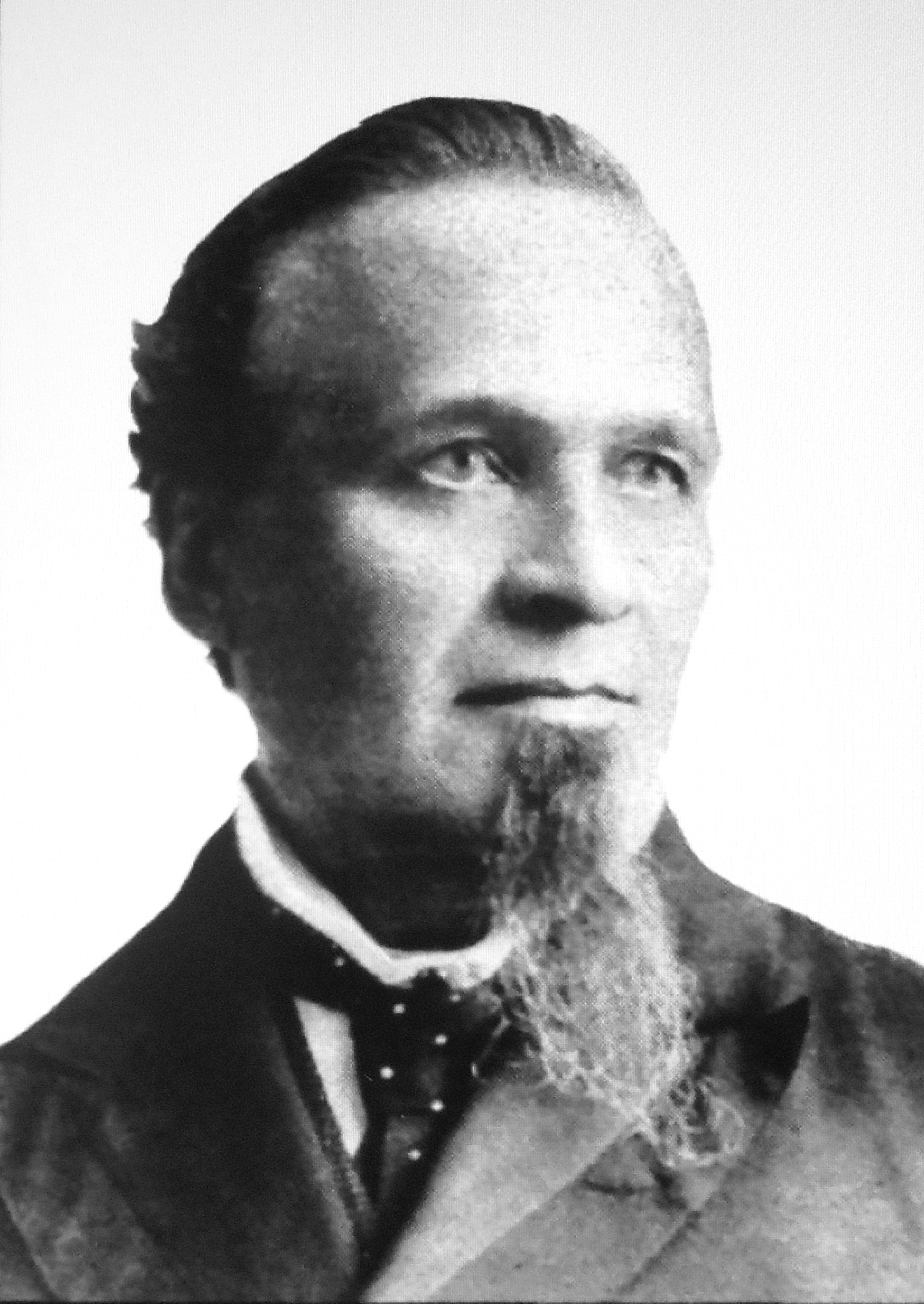
Joseph-Ferdinand Peachy, architect of the church

=== Foundation ===
In 1637, the Jesuits arrived in New France, and founded a mission in the area. They built the mission Saint-Joseph de Sillery, to minister to the local First Nations population. They named their mission after Saint Joseph. In 1644, they built a chapel, dedicated to Saint Michael, for the French and First Nations peoples on a promontory in Sillery known as pointe à Puiseaux. The Jesuits left in the late 1600s.

Until 1847, the local Catholic population had to travel to Sainte-Foy or Quebec City to attend Mass. That year, a local timber merchant, Patrick McInenly, had his house converted into a place of worship, St. Richard's Chapel. Later, with the congregation increasing, it was decided to build a church on the site of the first chapel.

=== Construction ===
Construction on the church began in 1852, utilizing the plans of the Irish-born architect Goodlatte Richardson Browne. In 1853, Joseph-Ferdinand Peachy took over as architect. The church opened for worship in 1854. The French form of the name, Colomb, was adopted by canonical decree in 1855. The following year, both the municipality and the parish took on the name St Columba of Sillery (St Colomb de Sillery, for the francophones). In 1880, the bell tower was completed and a spire was added according to Peachy's designs.

=== Developments ===
When the church was opened, most of the work on the interior had not started. This work began in October 1866 and was based on Browne's designs. Peachy supervised the work and Jean Vézina crafted the wooden decor and Maurice Larose did the masonry. In 1945, the Gothic Revival interior was changed during a renovation. The gold and white wooden altar was moved to the sacristy and a brown granite one from Chicoutimi was installed in its place. The choir stalls were removed and a wooden balustrade was replaced by a communion table made of iron. The pulpit was removed and new pews were installed. The stations of the cross were replaced with metal ones.

In 1969, the church was renamed St. Michel de Sillery. It was done to honour Pierre de Puiseaux. He was a former owner of pointe à Puiseaux.

== Parish ==
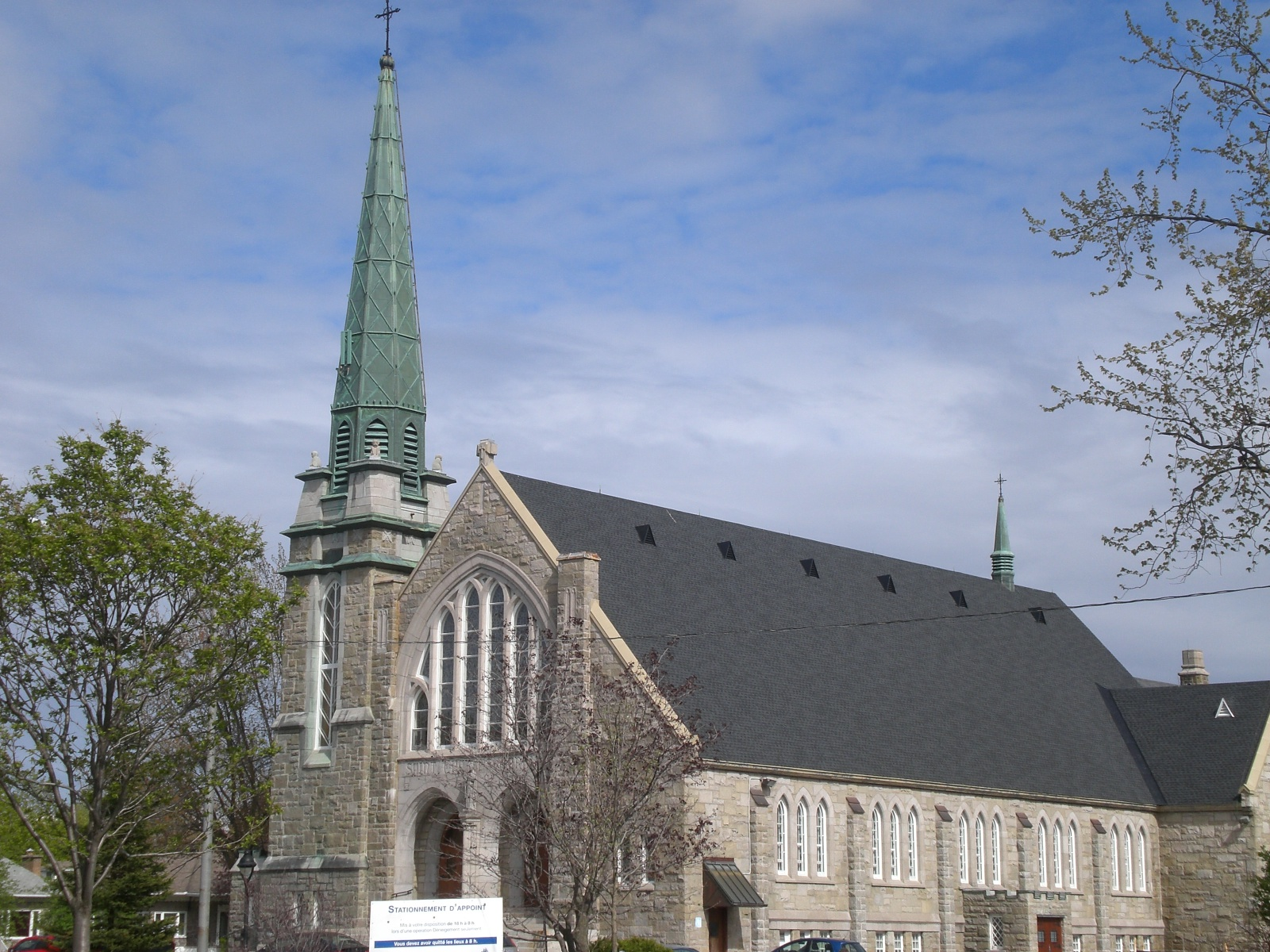
St Charles Garnier Church is in the same parish as St Michel de Sillery Church

The church is in the same parish as St. Charles Garnier Church (French: Église Saint-Charles-Garnier). It was founded on 7 August 1944 when Cardinal Villeneuve authorised the creation of a new parish, under the patronage of Saint Charles Garnier for the people in the northern part of the Sillery area. In the autumn of 1947, the church, designed by Charles A. Jean and built by François Jobin & Co., was opened.

As the two churches are now in the same parish, their Mass times do not conflict. St. Michel de Sillery Church has a Sunday Mass at 11:00am. It also Masses at 4:30pm on Wednesday and at 5:15pm on Friday. St. Charles Garnier Church has Masses for Sunday at 4:30pm on Saturday. It also has Masses at 4:30pm on Monday and 4:30pm on Thursday.

== Exterior ==
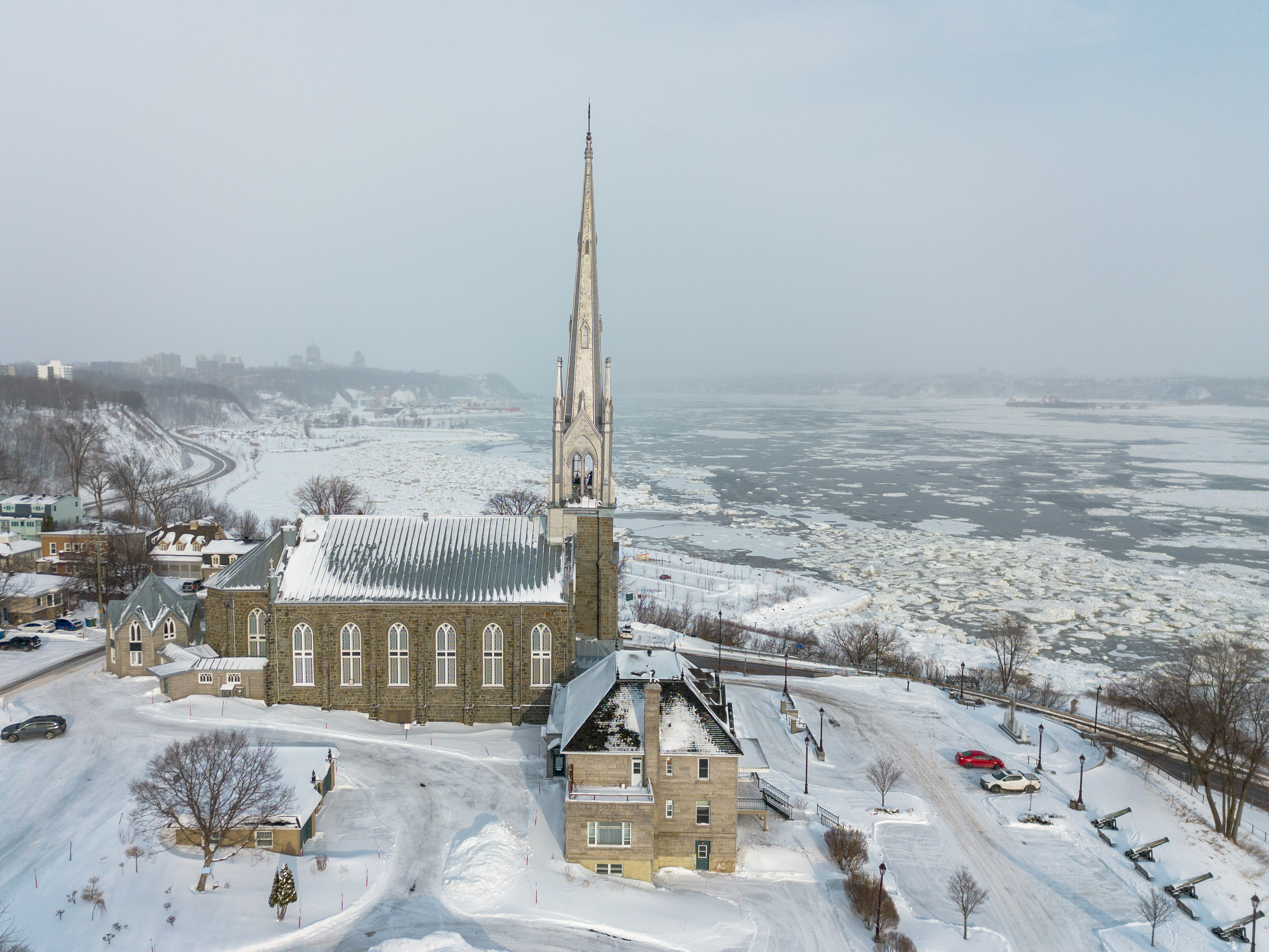
West side of the church

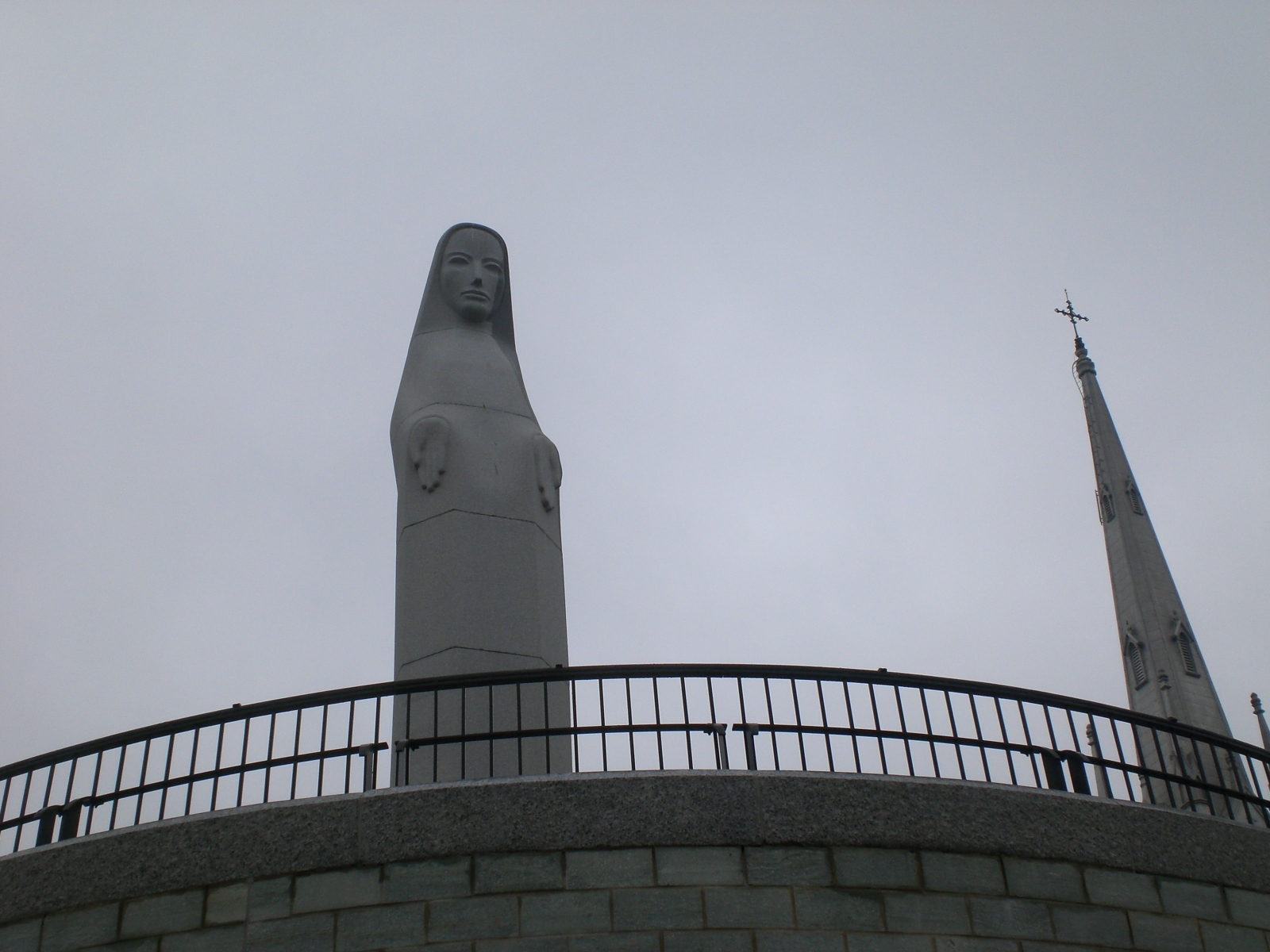
Statue of Mary in the church grounds

== See also ==
- Archdiocese of Québec
