= Sillery, Quebec City =

Sillery
- District (French: quartier)
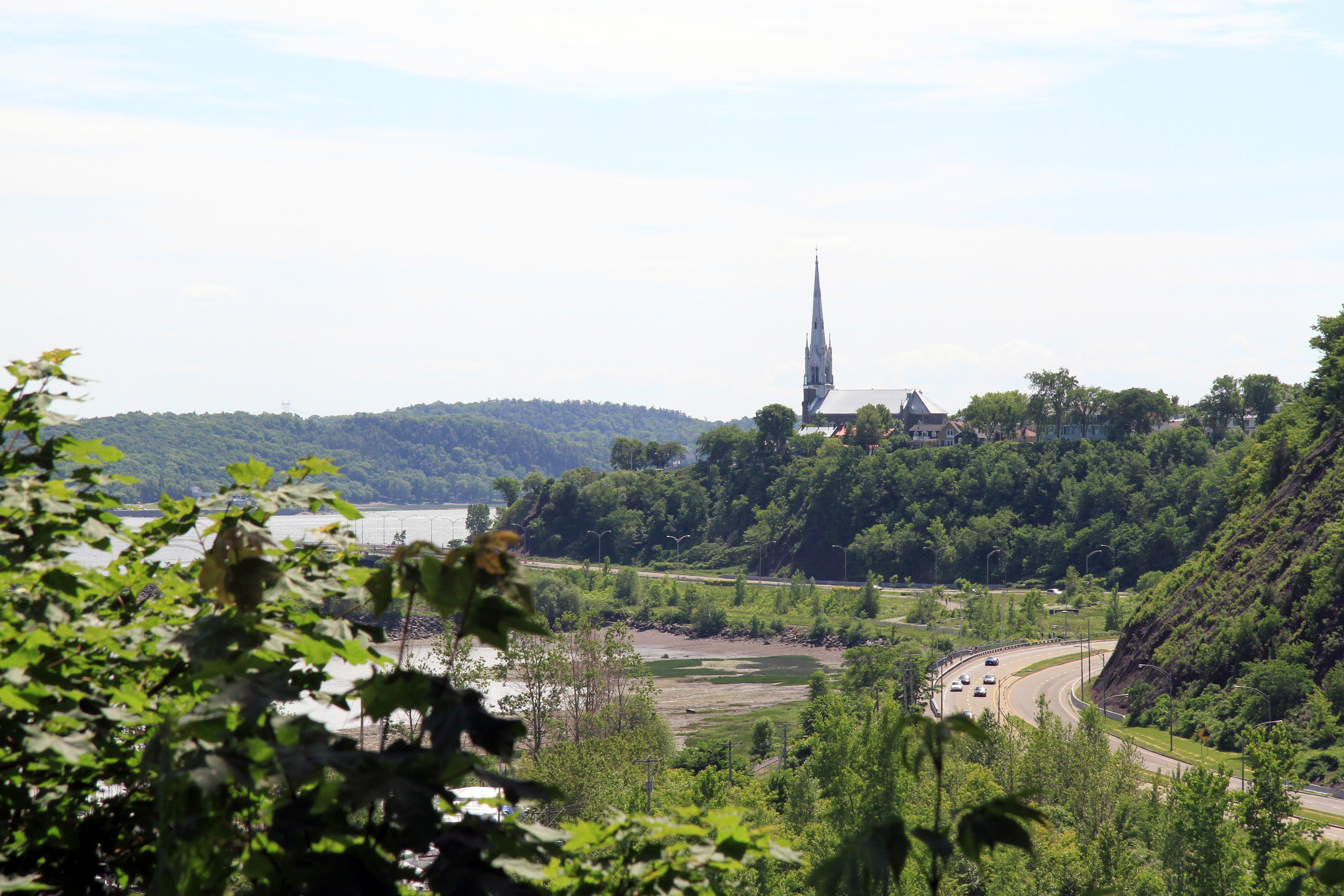
- Saint-Michel de Sillery Church and the Saint Lawrence River

- Coat of arms
- Etymology: Noël Brûlart de Sillery
- Motto: Latin: Non multa sed multum (Not many things but much) Sillery, outlined
- Sillery within Québec City
- Coordinates: 46°46′25″N 71°15′40″W
- Country: Canada
- Province: Quebec
- City: Quebec City
- Founded: 1637; 389 years ago
- District of Sainte-Foy–Sillery: 1 January 2002
- District of Sainte-Foy–Sillery–Cap-Rouge: 1 November 2009
- Founder: Noël Brûlart de Sillery (financier); Jesuits

Government
  - Body: Conseil de quartier

Area
  - Total: 7.55 km^{2} (2.92 sq mi)
- Elevation: 72 m (236 ft)

Population (2016)
  - Total: 13,570
  - Density: 1,800/km^{2} (4,660/sq mi)
- Demonym: Sillerois(e)
- Time zone: UTC−05:00 (EST)
  - Summer (DST): UTC−04:00 (EDT)
- Postal Code FSA: G1S
- Area codes: 418, 581, 367
- Website: www.ville.quebec.qc.ca/citoyens/participation-citoyenne/conseils_quartier/sillery/index.aspx (in French)

Sillery (French pronunciation: [silʁi]), a former independent city founded in 1637, is one of 35 administrative sectors (French: quartiers), which are unincorporated places, located in the post-expansion jurisdiction of the City of Quebec, Quebec, Canada. Sillery was one of multiple self-governing municipalities amalgamated into a vastly expanded Quebec City, that went into legal effect on January 1, 2002, as part of the province-wide 2000–06 municipal reorganization in Quebec. Located alongside in what pre-merger was the southwestern border of Quebec City, Sillery is a constituent district (French: quartier) of the borough (French: arrondissement) of Sainte-Foy–Sillery–Cap-Rouge. The territorially expanded City of Quebec consists of six boroughs.

Four heritage sites are located within Quebec City, one of which is situated in Sillery. The neighbourhood of Sillery contains the Sillery Heritage Site, which was recognized as heritage district by the provincial government on 5 February 1964. On 22 June 2006, the federal government's Parks Canada included Sillery's historic district on its Canadian Register of Historic Places. In 2013, Quebec City changed the name of the historic district to Sillery Heritage Site (French: site patrimonial de Sillery), as part of its preparation for the provincial government's transfer of responsibility for the district's management to it.

The City of Quebec has 27 neighbourhood councils (French: conseils de quartiers) spread across its territorial jurisdiction. Sillery has city representation and citizen participation through le conseil de quartier de Sillery. The council has public meetings, at Sillery's community centre, which on average are scheduled once a month. Sillery elects a total of 10 board members in staggered terms of office holding.

== History ==
Sillery was named for Noël Brûlart de Sillery (1577–1640), Knight of Malta. A wealthy and successful French diplomat, he renounced worldly goods and became a Catholic priest. He provided the funds for the establishment in 1637–1638 of a settlement for First Nations converts to Catholicism.

The community was established at a cove where the Algonquin gathered for summer to fish for eels. Originally named in honour of Saint Joseph and called Kamiskouaouangachit in the Algonquin language, the settlement became the home of up to 40 Algonquin Christian families who lived there most of the year, excluding the hunting season. The formation of this settlement came as a result of longterm Algonquin interest in agriculture, conversions to Christianity, and pressure from the ongoing Beaver War. The residents included Algonquins from as far away as the Ottawa river valley.

Missionaries to New France, such as Jacques Gravier, studied with the indigenous residents of Sillery to learn their languages before going to more distant settlements. By the early 18th century, he had compiled a nearly 600–page dictionary of Kaskaskia Illinois–French. By 1640, the Augustinian sisters established a convent in the community, which hosted non-permanent residents of the community, especially refugees of the Beaver War or seasonal visitors in winter. Many of the community's natives fell victim to epidemics of new infectious diseases, to which they had no natural immunity. The settlement was largely depopulated by the late 1680s.

Renamed Sillery in honour of its financier, the town later became important as a port for the lumber industry. The city of Sillery's motto was non multa sed multum, the Latin proverb of "not many things, but much," a fit descriptor for the small enclave. From the land at the water's edge, including Anse-au-Foulon, site of the disembarkation of General Wolfe's successful army in the Battle of the Plains of Abraham, the community spread up to the top of the heights overlooking the Saint Lawrence River. In 1760, during the French and Indian War, the Battle of Sainte-Foy was fought near Sillery, as part of a French attempt to re-capture Quebec City, which had been taken by the British the previous year.

Sillery houses Bois-de-Coulonge Park, once the viceregal residence of Quebec. A villa known as Spencer Wood was built in 1854 by the government of the Province of Canada, and was purchased by the Quebec Government in 1870 to serve as the residence of Quebec's Lieutenant-Governors until 1966, when a major fire destroyed the main residence. Originally an estate (French: domaine) named in honour of the assassinated United Kingdom Prime Minister Spencer Perceval, in 1815, by his nephew, Michael Henry Perceval, it was renamed Bois-de-Coulonge in 1950.

Commanding the bluffs just west of the city of Québec, in modern times Sillery was known principally for its quiet tree-lined streets, historic churches such as Saint-Michel de Sillery Church, views of the river, and several very old schools run by a variety of religious institutes. Its coat of arms consisted of a red shield with a white Maltese cross in the upper right hand corner and a three-masted ship in the lower left.

== Profile ==
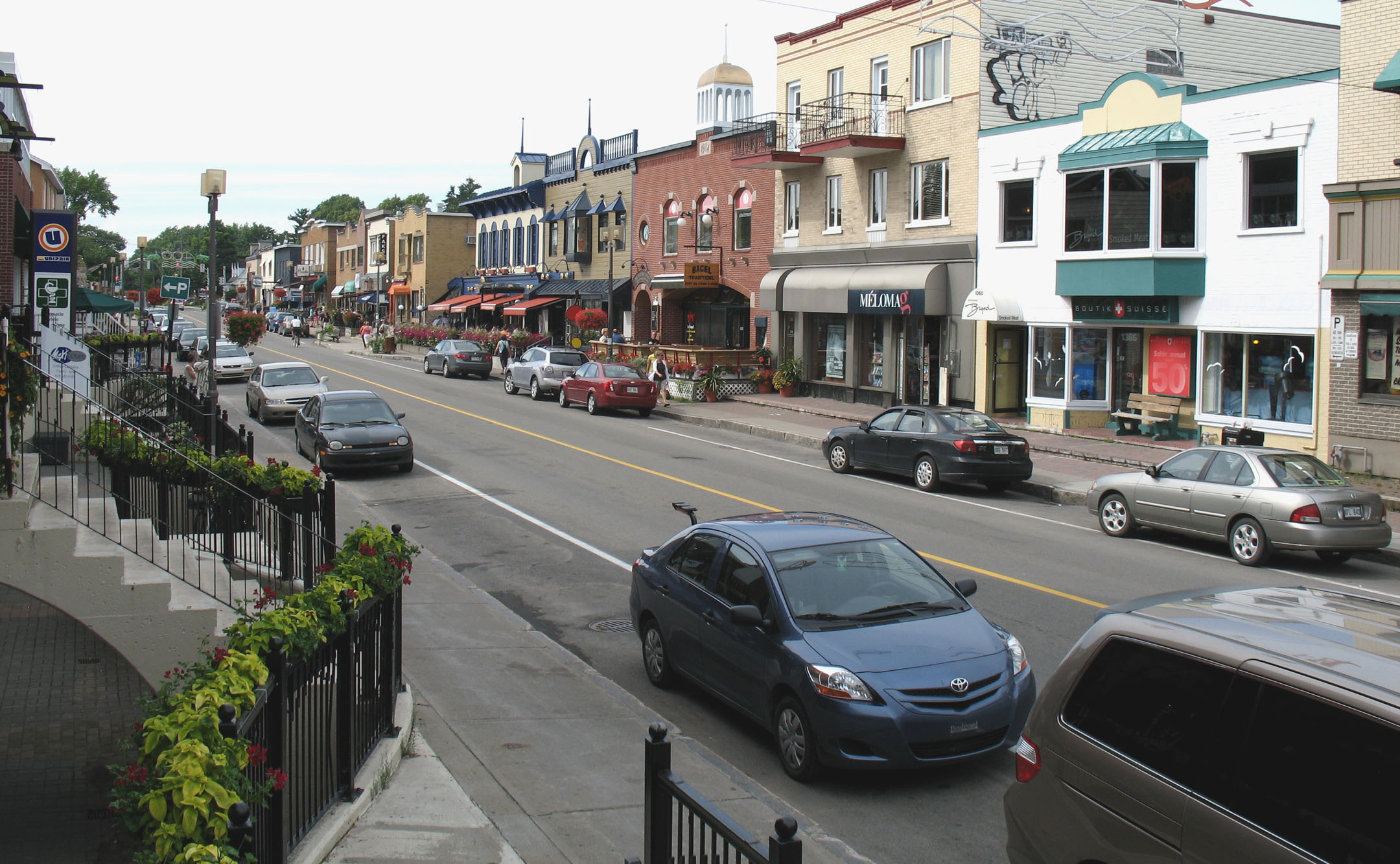
Commercial Maguire Street (avenue Maguire)

On January 1, 2002, as part of a legislated amalgamation of cities across Quebec, Sillery ceased to exist as an independent municipality. Its territory became a part of the Sainte-Foy—Sillery—Cap-Rouge Borough of Quebec. Of the former municipalities that now comprise Quebec, Sillery was relatively linguistically diverse. In 2006, 4.95% of its population had at least English for mother tongue, and 5.75% for languages other than French or English, while for the census metropolitan area of Quebec City, it was respectively 1.75% and 2.93%.

Sillery is also known as one of the most affluent area of Quebec City, as residential properties sold on average for CA$570,000 in 2017, and where live a number of professors of nearby Laval University. Nonetheless, there is still a pocket of modest and small apartment buildings.

According to the statistics agency of Quebec, in 2001 the average income of Sillery households was CA$113,091, and 58% of them earned more than CA$80,000 per year (in both case the highest figure in the Capitale-Nationale region.) In 2012, the personal average income was CA$55,645, still the highest in the Quebec City region.

== 2006 Census data ==
The city of Sillery was dissolved in 2002, but Statistics Canada still provided information up to the Census of 2006:

- Population: 11,803 (-0.9% change since 2001)
- Number of private dwellings: 4,856
- Average household size : 2.3 persons
- Median household income (for 2005): CA$107,142
- Percentage of Canadian citizens: 94.15%
- Percentage of visible minority: 5%
- Population over 15 years of age without a certificate, diploma or degree: 8.06%
- Area: 6.7 km²
- Density: 1,761.3 persons per km²

== 2016 Sociodemographic and economic profile ==
In January 2019, the City of Québec published a longitudinal sociodemographic (French: sociodémographique) and economic profile of Sillery, utilizing Statistics Canada's census data for the years 1996, 2006, and 2016.

- Population: 13,570 (-3.3% change since 1996)
- Number of private dwellings: 5,625
- Average household size : 2.3 persons
- Median household income (for 2015): CA$149,206
- Percentage of Canadian citizens: 90.2%
- Population over 15 years of age without a certificate, diploma or degree: 6.1%

== Gallery ==
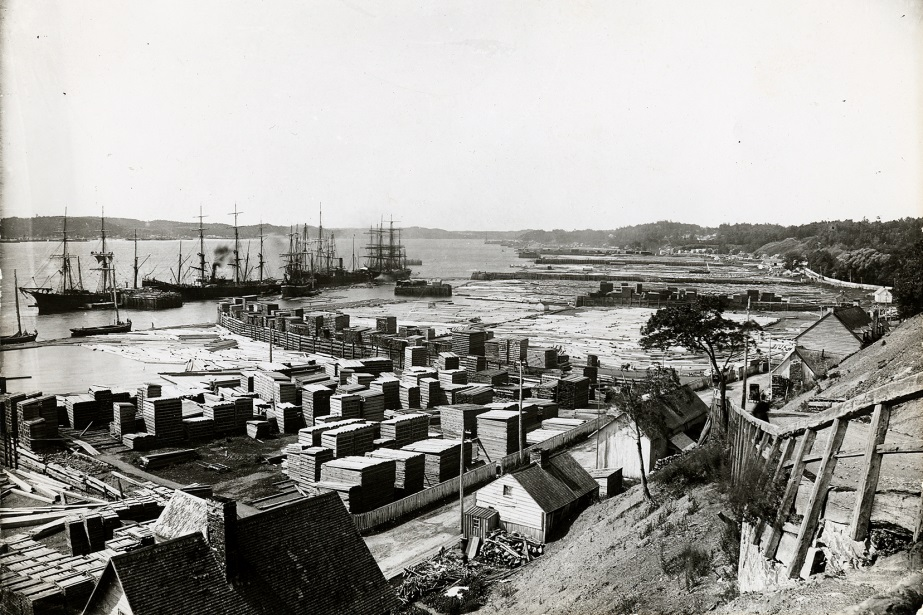
The timber trade at Sillery Cove in 1900.

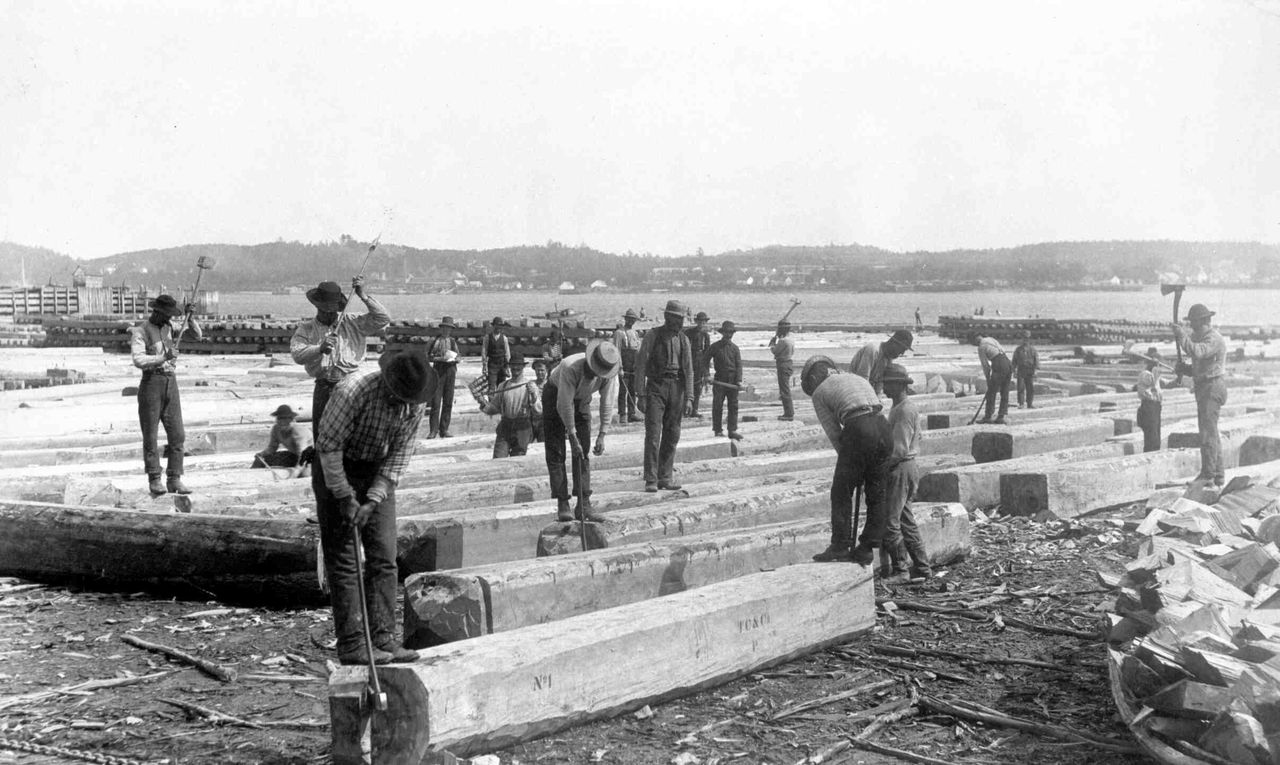
Lumberman on the banks of Sillery Cove, c. 1900

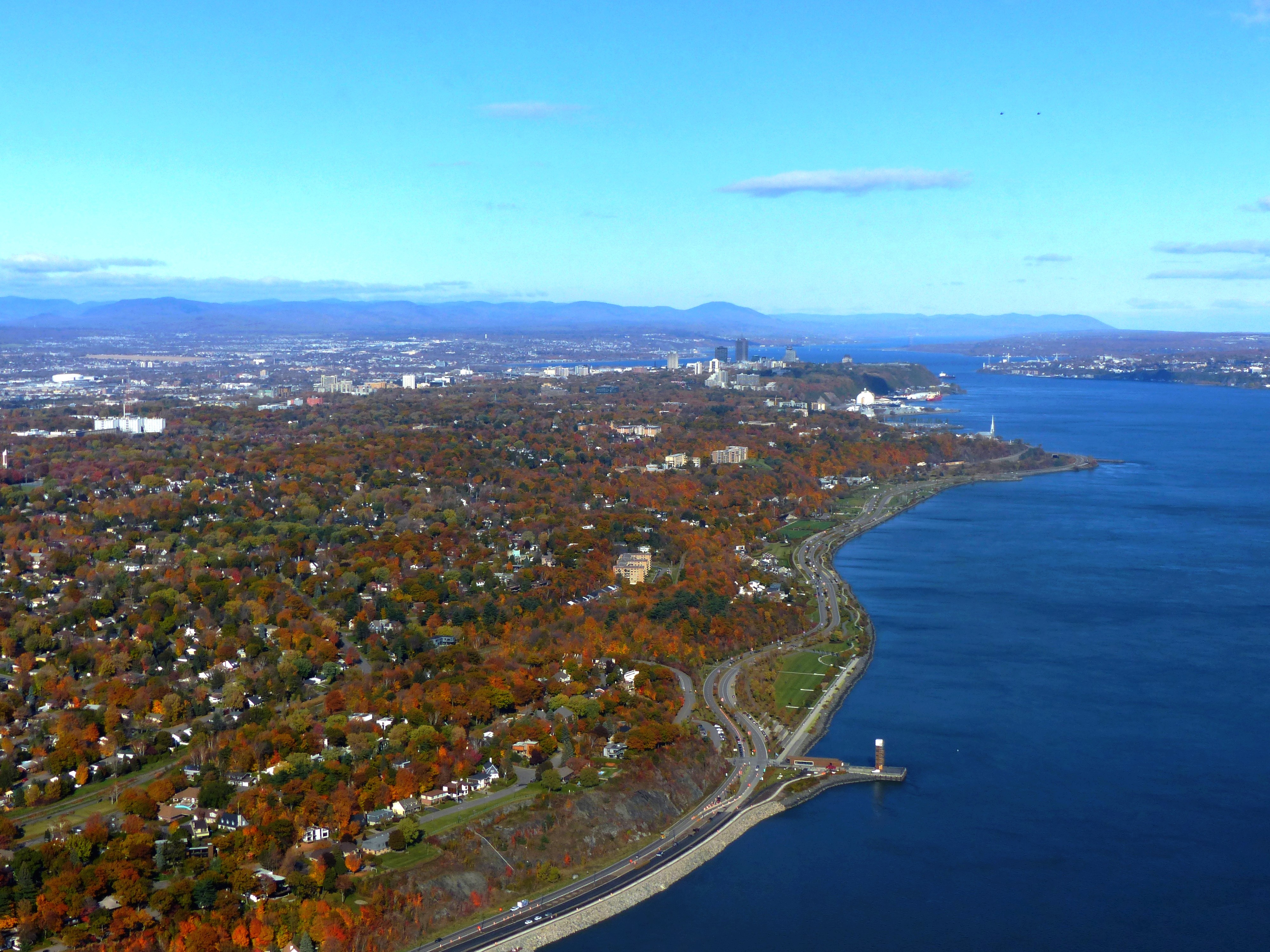
Panoramic view of Sillery

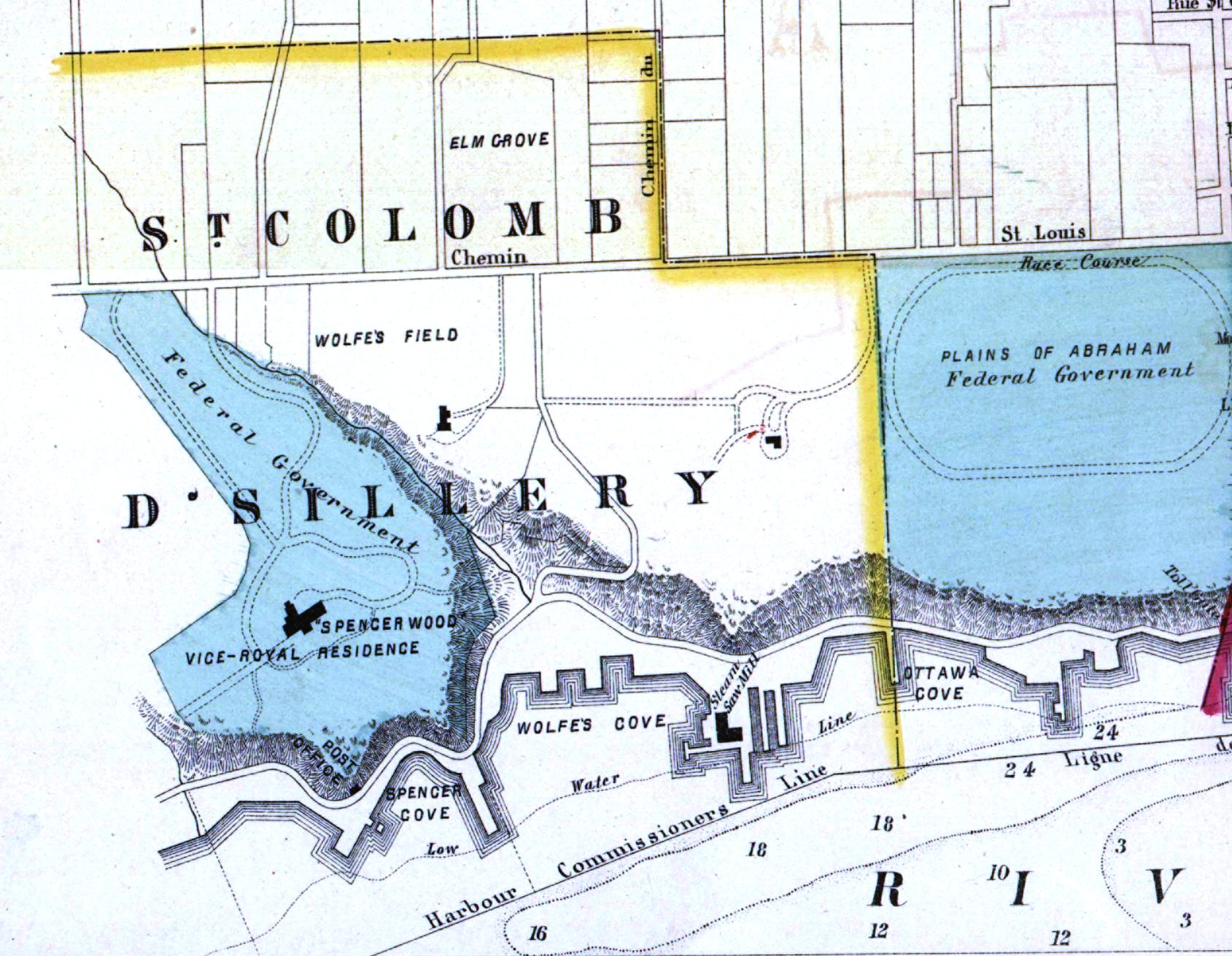
The eastern portion of Sillery, from an 1879 atlas

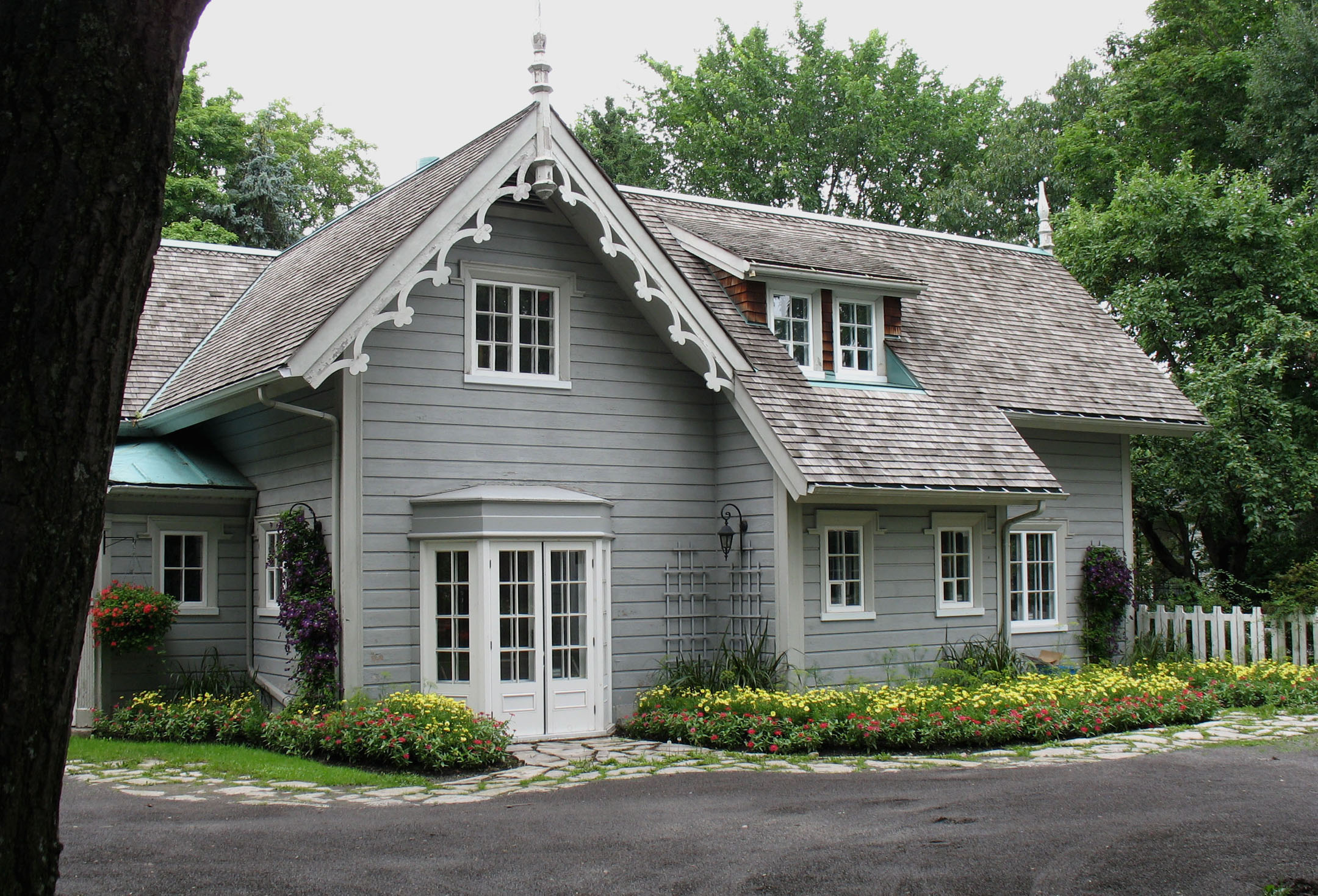
Villa Bagatelle, a 19th century cottage, functions as an art gallery and a museum

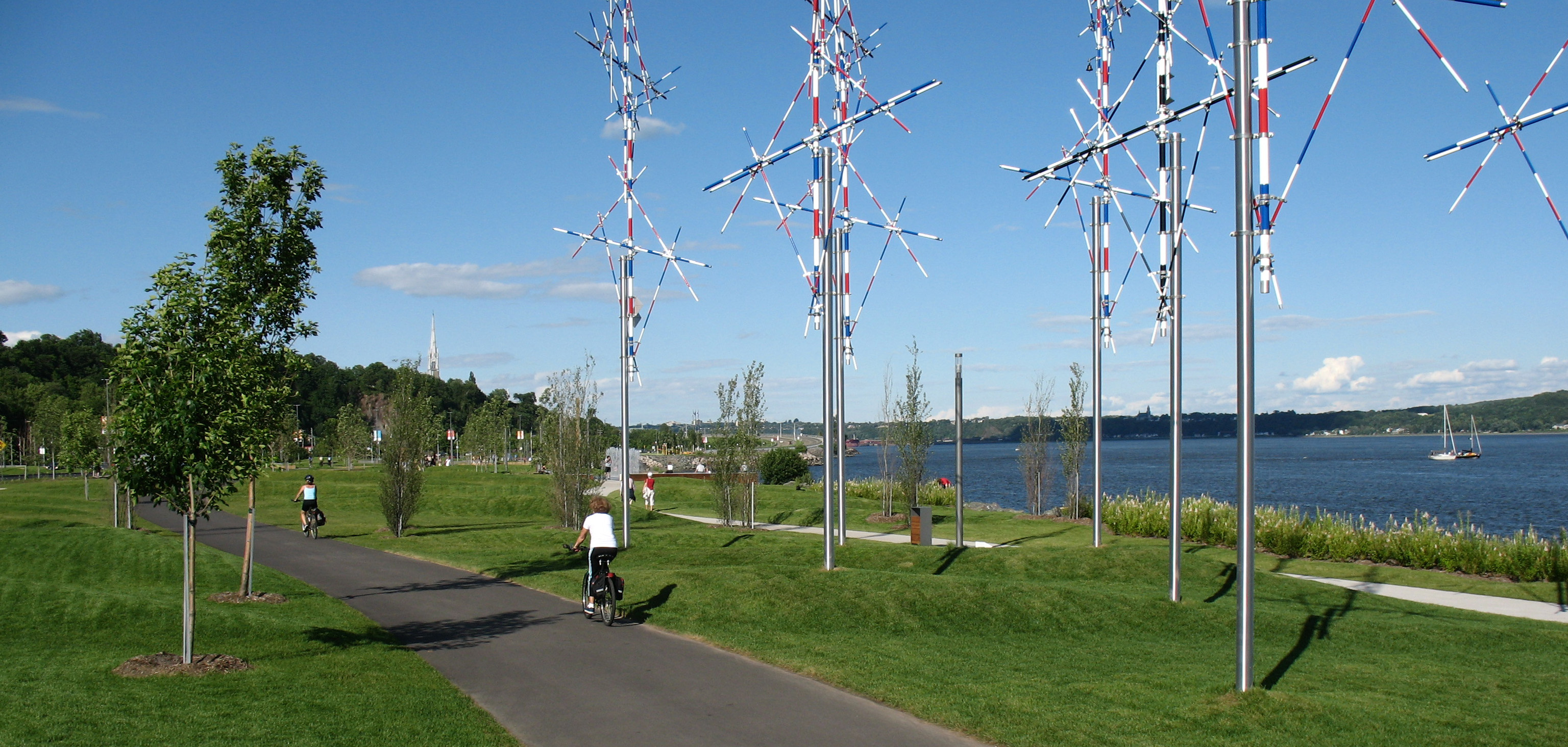
Promenade Samuel-De Champlain

== See also ==
- Bois-de-Coulonge Park — former location of Government House
- List of former cities in Quebec
- Saint-Michel de Sillery Church
- Sillery Heritage Site
- Mount Hermon Cemetery
- The History of Emily Montague, a 1769 novel written and set in Sillery
