= Jorge Cilley =

Argentine rugby union player

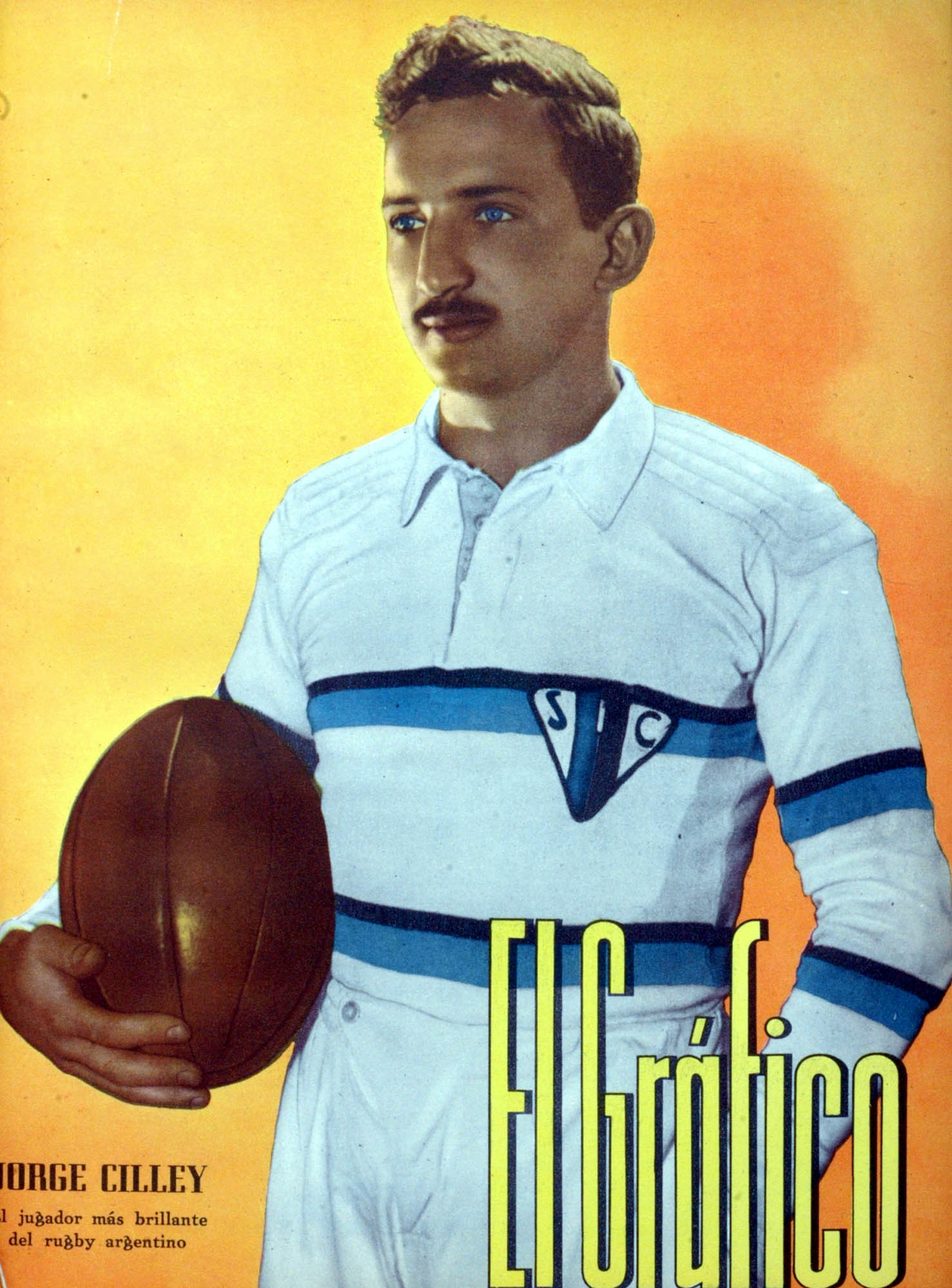
- Cilley with San Isidro Club in 1939
- Born: 1914 Buenos Aires, Argentina
- Died: 1960 (aged 45–46) Buenos Aires, Argentina

Rugby union career
- Position: Flanker
Amateur team(s)
| Years | Team | Apps | (Points) |
| – | C.A. San Isidro | | |
| 1935-1943 | San Isidro Club | | |
International career
| Years | Team | Apps | (Points) |
| 1936-1938 | Argentina | | |

Jorge Cilley (1914–1960), nicknamed La Chinche was an Argentine rugby union flanker who played for both, Club Atlético San Isidro (CASI) and San Isidro Club (SIC). He also was four times capped for the Argentina national team.

== Career ==
Cilley began his career in Club Atlético San Isidro, where he won the Torneo de la URBA titles of 1933 and 1934. Cilley was one of the founding members of San Isidro Club, team where he won two URBA titles fin 1939 and 1941.

On August 16, 1936, Cilley had his first test match against Great Britain. He participates in the first tour outside the country of the Argentina national team. On September 20, 1936, in Valparaíso, Argentina played against the national team of Chile, with a score 29–0 in favor of Argentina.

=== Titles ===
| Season | Team | Title |
|---|---|---|
| 1933 | Club Atlético San Isidro | Torneo de la URBA |
| 1934 | Club Atlético San Isidro | Torneo de la URBA |
| 1939 | San Isidro Club | Torneo de la URBA |
| 1941 | San Isidro Club | Torneo de la URBA |

== Gallery ==
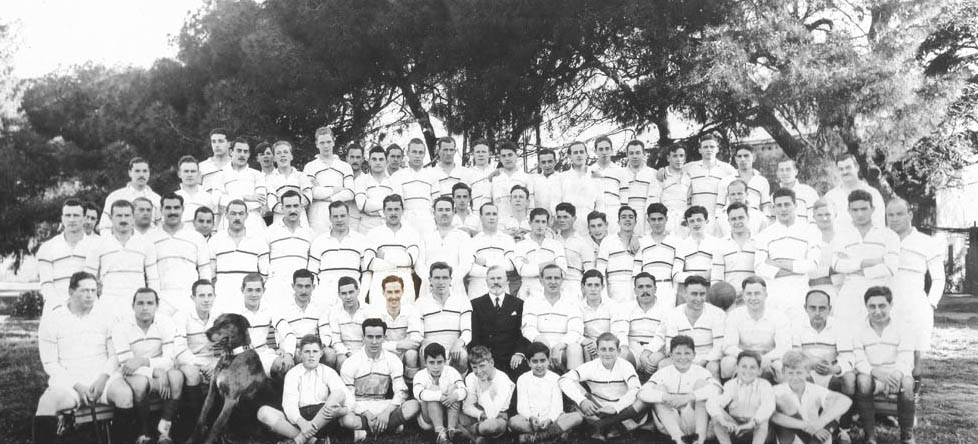
San Isidro Club all teams 1937

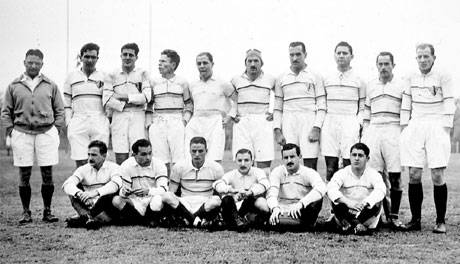
San Isidro Club team champions of 1939

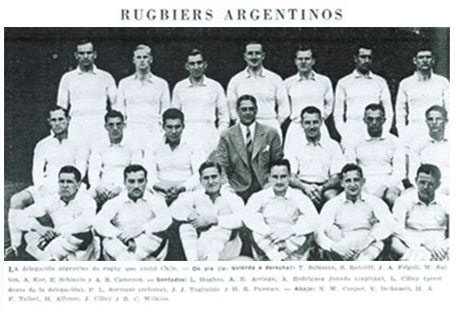
Los Pumas team 1936
