= Noël Brûlart de Sillery =

French diplomat

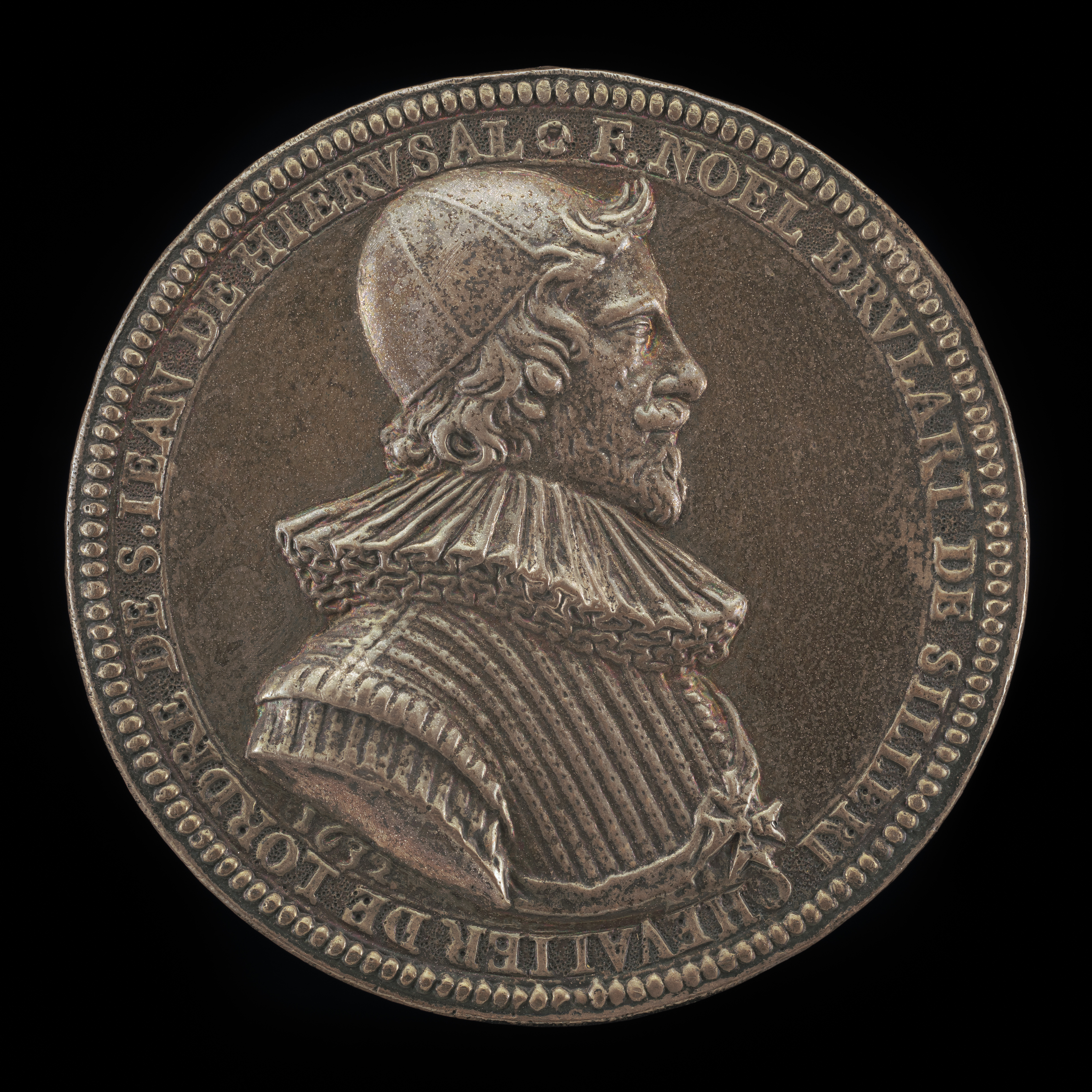
- Born: 25 December 1577; Kingdom of France
- Died: 26 September 1640 (aged 62); Kingdom of France
- Occupation: Diplomat (1614–), diplomat (1622–1624), Catholic priest (1634–)
- Relatives: Nicolas Brûlart de Sillery
- Position held: ambassador (1614–1624)

Noël Brûlart (or Brulart) de Sillery (1577–1640) was a French diplomat who, upon renouncing the world and taking holy orders, provided from his fortune for the establishment of a mission in New France.

The youngest child of Lord Pierre Brûlart de Berni and Dame Marie Cauchon de Sillery, Noel was named for the day of his birth, December 25, 1577. He joined the military-religious order of the Knights of Malta at a young age and distinguished himself by his service on that island.

In 1607, while on leave, he was presented at court in Paris. In 1614 he was made Ambassador to the Spanish court and in 1622, to Rome. It was in Rome that he first conceived of the idea of renouncing worldly goods and joining the priesthood.

He returned to Paris in 1624, where he lived a life of luxury that, for all the honours and riches he enjoyed, failed to satisfy him. In 1626, moved by the words of St. Vincent de Paul, he vowed to reform his life, dedicating his considerable energy, talents and fortune to the task of helping others. He began to give his money in support of a wide variety of charitable causes and foundations.

In 1632, he began to prepare in earnest for holy orders and divested himself of his palatial property in Paris. He successfully petitioned the Pope for the special dispensation that was required for a Knight of Malta to leave the order and become a priest.

In 1632, he gave twelve thousand pounds to fund the foundation of a mission in New France (Canada), which would eventually be named Sillery, in remembrance of his generosity. He became a priest in 1634. The mission, at that time called St. Joseph Mission, was built in 1638.

The former city of Sillery, Québec, was named for him. Located just west of old Quebec City, Sillery was among the many outlying municipalities amalgamated into an expanded Quebec City on January 1, 2002. Its former territory now forms part of the borough of Sainte-Foy–Sillery–Cap-Rouge. The name Sillery is still used locally for the picturesque neighbourhood.

A monument to Noël Brulart de Sillery, consisting of a pedestal and bust, stands on Avenue Chanoine-Morel next to the Community Centre named after him. Erected in 1956, the monument was created by artist René Thibault, based on a concept by architect Édouard Fiset.
